= List of newspapers in Switzerland =

The number of newspapers in Switzerland was 406 before World War I. It was reduced to 257 in 1995 and 197 in 2010. Prior to the 18th century, the Swiss press market was small, being limited to the elites who were literate, though development varied by region and language. The authorities of the Cantons of Switzerland also censored the press, which mostly prevented newspapers from reporting many aspects of local and confederal news. Due to the influence of the Enlightenment this began to change in the 1730s. The Helvetic Republic proclaimed national freedom of the press, but soon after censorship by the government increased again. The Tagsatzung made efforts to unify cantonal censorship practices through several decrees relating to the press and foreigners, which renewed efforts to get freedom of the press. This was achieved during the restoration period, after which a politically active press became present in all the linguistic regions of the country. Most papers then served to politically propagandize, even when operating as a loss. Press later became commercial, first in Francophone Switzerland in the 1870s, followed by German-speaking Switzerland in the 1890s; Italian-speaking Switzerland only did the same towards the end of the 20th century.

Switzerland has a high rate of newspaper reading, even with the creation of electronic media. The Francophone press market was, for several generations, dominated by Edipresse (Lausanne, which owned most of the dailies) and Ringier (Zurich, owned most of the magazines), but new competition arrived in the 21st century. Edipresse's Swiss operations were in 2009 bought out by Tamedia (Zurich; now TX Group). The country was ranked 9th in the yearly Press Freedom Index published by Reporters Without Borders in 2024.

== Current ==
=== German language ===
The leading German-language papers in Switzerland are Blick, Tages-Anzeiger, Neue Zürcher Zeitung, and Basler Zeitung.

Name	Established	Owner	City	Canton	Occurrence	Ref.
20 Minuten	1999	TX Group	Zurich	Canton of Zurich	Daily	
Baslerstab	1977	Basler Zeitung Medien	Basel	Basel-Stadt	Daily	
Aargauer Zeitung	1996	AZ Medien Gruppe	Aarau	Canton of Aargau	Daily	
Appenzeller Zeitung	1828	CH Media	St. Gallen	Appenzell Ausserrhoden/Appenzell Innerrhoden	Daily	
Basellandschaftliche Zeitung (bz)	1832	Luedin	Liestal	Basel-Landschaft	Daily	
Basler Zeitung (BaZ)	1977	Basler Zeitung Medien	Basel	Basel-Stadt	Daily	
Berner Zeitung	1979	Espace Media Groupe/TX Group	Bern	Canton of Bern	Daily	
Bieler Tagblatt	1850	Gassmann AG	Biel/Bienne	Canton of Bern	Daily	
Blick	1959	Ringier	Zurich	Canton of Zurich	Daily	
Bote der Urschweiz	1858	Triner family	Schwyz	Canton of Schwyz	Daily	
Bote vom Untersee und Rhein	1900	Keller family	Steckborn	Canton of Thurgau	Twice weekly	
Der Bund	1850	TX Group	Bern	Canton of Bern	Daily	
Engadiner Post	1894	Gammeter Media AG	St. Moritz	Canton of the Grisons	Thrice weekly	
Finanz und Wirtschaft	1928	TX Group	Zurich	Canton of Zurich	Weekly	
Freiburger Nachrichten	1904	Freiburger Nachrichten AG	Fribourg	Canton of Fribourg	Daily	
Handelszeitung	1861	Axel Springer SE	Zurich	Canton of Zurich	Weekly	
Der Landbote	1836	Ziegler Druck und Verlags AG	Winterthur	Canton of Zurich	Daily	
Limmattaler Zeitung	1972	AZ Medien	Dietikon	Canton of Zurich	Daily	
Luzerner Zeitung	1996	CH Media	Lucerne	Canton of Lucerne	Daily	
Neue Zürcher Zeitung	1780	NZZ Mediengruppe	Zurich	Canton of Zurich	Daily	
Neue Liewo	1993	Liechtensteiner Vaterland	Werdenberg	Canton of St. Gallen	Weekly	
Nidwaldner Zeitung	1866	CH Media		Canton of Nidwalden	Daily	
Novitats	1983	Somedia	Lenzerheide	Canton of the Grisons	Weekly	
Obersee Nachrichten	1981	Zürcher Regionalzeitungen AG	Rapperswil	Canton of St. Gallen	Weekly	
SonntagsZeitung	2009	TX Group			Weekly	
St. Galler Tagblatt	1839	St. Galler Tagblatt AG	St. Gallen	Canton of St. Gallen	Daily	
Solothurner Zeitung	1878	AZ Medien		Canton of Solothurn	Thrice weekly	
Die Südostschweiz	1997	Somedia	Chur	Canton of the Grisons	Daily	
Tagblatt der Stadt Zürich	1730	TX Group	Zurich	Canton of Zurich	Weekly	
Tages-Anzeiger	1893	TX Group	Zurich	Canton of Zurich	Daily	
TagesWoche	2011	Neue Medien Basel AG	Basel	Basel-Stadt	Weekly/Online	
Tessiner Zeitung	1908	Rezzonico Editore SA	Locarno	Canton of Ticino	Weekly	
Thurgauer Zeitung	1798	Thurgauer Medien AG	St. Gallen	Canton of St. Gallen	Daily	
Walliser Bote	1840	Mengis Druck & Verlag	Brig	Canton of Valais	Daily	
Watson	2014	CH Media	N/A	N/A	Online	
WOZ Die Wochenzeitung	1981	Genossenschaft infolink	Zurich	Canton of Zurich	Weekly	
Zuger Zeitung	1991	CH Media	Zug	Canton of Zug	Daily	
Zürcher Oberländer	1852	Zürcher Oberland Medien AG	Wetzikon	Canton of Zurich	Daily	
Zürcher Unterländer	1852	TA Medien AG	Bülach	Canton of Zurich	Daily	
Zürichsee-Zeitung	1845	Zürcher Regionalzeitungen AG	Stäfa	Canton of Zurich	Daily	

=== French language ===
The leading Francophone papers in Switzerland are 24 heures, Tribune de Genève, La Liberté, and Le Temps. Prior to 1830, the press was limited, largely due to government censorship which made covering political topics difficult. There were a few political newspapers, but they usually had short lifespans, in addition to some opinion papers. Due to the increased freedoms in the post 1830 period, the amount of newspapers dramatically increased. From 1870 to 1910, there was also a large increase in local Francophone papers, whereas before there were largely only papers for cantonal capitals and cities. There was also a cantonal press, with more professional journalism and with a larger format (also with access to news agencies). Many such papers were expressly political and partisan; in contrast there was a more neutral press, like the Tribune de Genève, L'Impartial, and Tribune de Lausanne, which were successful.

In this period the only papers with multiple canton circulation were the Tribune de Genève, Journal de Genève, and the Gazette de Lausanne. Toward the end of the 19th century, the Francophone press became increasingly commercialized, which resulted in tension between the cantonal and local news (who often took from the cantonal press for their information), and several journalist associations were created at the turn of the century. From 1910 to the mid-1950s there was a steady number of papers, with about 110. During the 1970s there was a decline in titles, with mergers and closers, resulting in part from changes in advertising. The company Lousonna, later Edipresse, became increasingly dominant and would later own a large portion of the industry. It competed with Tamedia (TX Group), which acquired its Swiss operations in 2009.

Name	Established	Owner	City	Canton	Occurrence	Ref.
20 minutes	2006	TX Group			Daily	
24 heures	1762	TX Group	Lausanne	Canton of Vaud	Daily	
L'Ajoie	2014	L'Ajoie Editions SA	Porrentruy	Canton of Jura	Weekly	
ArcInfo	2018	ESH Médias	Neuchâtel	Canton of Neuchâtel	Daily	
Les Afriques	2007	Les Afriques Editions et Communication SA	Geneva	Canton of Geneva	Weekly	
L'AGEFI	1950	Agefi Groupe SA	Échandens	Canton of Vaud	Twice weekly	
Blick	1959	Ringier	Zurich	Canton of Zurich	Daily	
La Côte	1987	ESH Médias	Nyon	Canton of Vaud	Daily	
Le Confédéré	1861	Journal le Confédéré SA	Martigny	Canton of Valais	Weekly	
Le Courrier	1868	Nouvelle association du Courrier	Geneva	Canton of Geneva	Daily	
Entreprise romande	1933	Fédération des Entreprises Romandes Genève	Geneva	Canton of Geneva	Bimonthly	
La Gruyère	1882	St-Paul Médias SA	Fribourg	Canton of Fribourg	Thrice weekly	
La Broye Hebdo	1999	St-Paul Médias SA	Payerne	Canton of Fribourg; Canton of Vaud	Weekly	
Journal du Jura	1871	Gassmann AG	Biel/Bienne	Canton of Bern	Daily	
Journal de Morges	1894		Morges	Canton of Vaud	Weekly	
Journal de Sierre	1931	ESH Médias	Sierre	Canton of Valais	Twice monthly	
Journal du Pays-d'Enhaut	1989		Château-d'Œx	Canton of Vaud	Weekly	
La Liberté	1871	St-Paul Médias SA	Fribourg	Canton of Fribourg	Daily	
Le Matin	1893	TX Group	Lausanne	Canton of Vaud	Daily	
Le Nouvelliste	1903	ESH Médias	Sion	Canton of Valais	Daily	
Le Nord Vaudois	2025	ESH Médias	Yverdon-les-Bains	Canton of Vaud	Weekly	
Nouvelle revue	1868		Lausanne	Canton of Vaud	Monthly	
Le Quotidien Jurassien	1993	Editions D+P SA	Delémont	Canton of Jura	Daily	
Le Temps	1998	Fondation Aventinus	Geneva	Canton of Geneva	Daily	
Tribune de Genève	1879	TX Group	Geneva	Canton of Geneva	Daily	
Watson	2014	CH Media	N/A	N/A	Online	

=== Italian language ===
Journalism in Ticino declined during the period of Napoleon's rule, due to French influence and suppression. Following the restoration there was a resurgence.

Name	Established	Owner	City	Canton	Occurrence	Ref.
L'Avvenire dei Lavoratori	1897		Zurich	Canton of Zurich	Quarterly	
Corriere del Ticino	1891	Fondazione per il Corriere del Ticino	Muzzano	Canton of Ticino	Daily	
Giornale del Popolo	1926	Nuova Società Editrice del Giornale del Popolo SA	Lugano	Canton of Ticino	Daily	
Il Grigione Italiano	1852		Poschiavo	Canton of the Grisons	Weekly	
laRegione	1992	Giacomo Salvioni	Bellinzona	Canton of Ticino	Daily	
20 Minuti	2011	TX Group			Daily	

=== Romansh language ===
Romansh language press has only existed since the 19th century, with the singular exception of the Gazetta ordinaria da Scuol paper, founded in 1700. As the language is divided into five different written forms and the Grisons are divided by Christian denomination, the papers created reflected this linguistic and religious diversity. Papers were regional, mostly weekly or twice weekly and largely had low print runs. In 1997, all Romansh papers besides La Pagina da Surmeir and Engadiner Post / Posta Ladina were absorbed into the paper La Quotidiana, the first daily Romansh newspaper.

Name	Established	Owner	City	Canton	Occurrence	Ref.
La Pagina da Surmeir	1945			Canton of the Grisons		
La Quotidiana	1997	Somedia	Chur	Canton of the Grisons	Daily	
Engadiner Post / Posta Ladina	1894	Gammeter Media AG		Canton of the Grisons		

=== Other languages ===
Name	Owner	Established	City	Canton	Language	Occurrence	Ref.
Bota Sot	Mazrekaj Media	1995	Zurich (formerly; now published in Kosovo)	Canton of Zurich	Albanian	Daily	
Le News	Le News Sàrl	2013	Lausanne	Canton of Vaud	English	Twice weekly	

== Defunct ==
=== German language ===
Name	Established	Defunct	City	Canton	Occurrence	Notes	Ref.
Rorschacher Monatsschrift	1597	?				One of the first German-language Swiss papers	
Ordinari-Zeitung	1610/1611	?	Basel	Basel-Stadt	Weekly	One of several papers with this title, generally pure news, common in trade and commercial cities. Ordinary as in regular publication of the paper (then not a given). Separate paper in the same city started again in 1682	
Ordinari-Zeitung	1622/1623	?	Zurich	Canton of Zurich	Weekly	Sometimes called the Ordinari-Post-Zeitung or Wochentliche Ordinari-Post-Zeitung after 1934	
Ordinari-Zeitung	1639	?	Lucerne	Canton of Lucerne	Weekly		
Berner Zeitung	1665	1666	Bern	Canton of Bern		One of several publications called the Berner Zeitung. Banned by the authorities a year after its creation for printing an article criticizing the First War of Villmergen	
Ordinari-Mittwochen-Zeitung	1679	?	Zurich	Canton of Zurich	Weekly		
Donnerstägliche Post- und Ordinari-Zeitung	1687	?	Bern	Canton of Bern	Weekly		
Zinstägliche Ordinari-Zeitung	?	?	Bern	Canton of Bern	Weekly	Printed Tuesdays	
Berner Wochenblatt	1730s	1833	Bern	Canton of Bern	Weekly	Previously called the Avis-Blättlein, Hoch-Obrigkeitlich Privilegiertes Avis-Blättlein, Hoch-Obrigkeitlich Privilegiertes-Avisblatt, Hoch-Obrigkeitlich Privilegiertes-Wochenblatt. Succeeded by the Der Bernische Anzeiger	
Zürcherisches Wochenblatt	1730	1843	Zurich	Canton of Zurich	Twice weekly	Originally known as the Donnstags-Nachrichten, then the Donnstags-Blatt. Taken over by the Tagblatt der Stadt Zürich	
Berner Volksfreund	1831	1845	Burgdorf	Canton of Bern	Twice weekly	Founded by Karl and Johann Schnell. Succeeded by the Berner Volkszeitung	
Allgemeine Schweizer Zeitung	1831	1846	Bern	Canton of Bern	Thrice weekly	Succeeded the Neue Schweizer Zeitung	
Bündner Landbote	1845	1847	Chur	Canton of the Grisons	Weekly		
Berner Volkszeitung	1846	1847	Bern	Canton of Bern	Daily	Founded by Johann Ludwig Schnell and Eduard Blösch. Succeeded by the Emmenthaler Bote	
Der freie Rhätier	1843	1848			Biweekly	Liberal orientation, created by Peter Conradin von Planta	
Wochenblatt für die vier löblichen Kantone Ury, Schwytz, Unterwalden und Zug	1814	1849	Zug	Canton of Zug	Weekly	Later published as the Neue Zuger-Zeitung, then the Zuger-Zeitung, then the Der freie Schweizer	
Zugerisches Kantonsblatt	1849	1858	Zug	Canton of Zug	Weekly		
Solothurner Blatt	1831	1861		Canton of Solothurn	Twice weekly		
Der Wahrheitsfreund	1835	1863	St. Gallen	Canton of St. Gallen	Weekly	First published as Der St. Gallische Wahrheitsfreund; succeeded by the Ostschweiz	
Der Zugerbieter	1865	1868	Zug	Canton of Zug	Weekly	Absorbed by the Neue Zuger-Zeitung in 1868	
Tagwacht	1869	1880	Zurich	Canton of Zurich	Twice weekly	Called Diane in French.	
Der Sozialdemokrat	1879	1890	Zurich	Canton of Zurich		Published in London from 1887	
Neue Zuger Zeitung	1846	1891	Zug	Canton of Zug		Merged with the Zuger Nachrichten in 1891	
Bündner Nachrichten	1885	1892	Chur	Canton of the Grisons	Daily	Merged in 1892 with the Der Freie Rätie, with the successor paper keeping that title	
Der Schweizerische Sozialdemokrat	1888	1892		Canton of Bern		Succeeded by the Berner Tagwacht	
Berner Zeitung	1831	1894	Bern	Canton of Bern	Daily	One of several publications called the Berner Zeitung. Created by Jakob Stämpfli	
Walliser Nachrichten	1901	1903	Sierre	Canton of Valais	Twice weekly		
Zürcher Nachrichten	1896	1904	Zurich	Canton of Zurich	Daily	Succeeded by the Neue Zürcher Nachrichten	
Seeländer Nachrichten		1904		Canton of Bern		Merged with the Seeländer Bote and the Tagblatt für die Stadt Biel to form the Bieler Tagblatt	
Tagblatt für die Stadt Biel		1904		Canton of Bern		Merged with the Seeländer Bote and the Seeländer Nachrichten to form the Bieler Tagblatt	
Der Weckruf	1903	1907	Geneva	Canton of Geneva		German version of Le Réveil	
Berner Volksfreund	1875	1910	Burgdorf	Canton of Bern	Daily	Succeeded the Emmenthaler Bote, succeeded by the Burgdorfer Tagblatt	
Zürcherische Freitagszeitung	1674	1914	Zurich	Canton of Zurich	Weekly	Changed its name several times. Formerly known as the Ordinari Wochen-Zeitung, Ordinari-Zeitungen, the Freytägliche Wochenzeitung, Züricher Freitags-Zeitung and then Zürcherische Freitagszeitung. Nicknamed the Bürkli-Zeitung to distinguish it from the other Zürcher Zeitung	
Walliser Volkszeitung	1921	1924	Brig	Canton of Valais	Weekly		
Volkswacht am Bodensee	1909	1934	Romanshorn	Canton of Thurgau			
Der Demokrat	1957	1959		Canton of Valais			
Briger Anzeiger	1899	1961		Canton of Valais	Twice weekly	Later became the Walliser Nachrichten-Briger Anzeiger. Merged with the Walliser Bote in 1961	
Zuger Volksblatt	1861	1965	Zug	Canton of Zug	Thrice weekly	Ceased publication in 1966, to be replaced with the Zuger Tagblatt/Zuger Zeitung	
Seeländer Volkszeitung	1920	1966	Biel/Bienne	Canton of Bern		Merged with the Berner Tagwacht in 1966	
Neue Berner Zeitung	1919	1973		Canton of Bern			
Der Freie Rätier	1868	1975		Canton of the Grisons	Daily	Created to replace the Bündner Volkszeitung. The Bündner Nachrichten was merged into it. Initially called Der freie Rhätier, then Der freie Rätier then Der Freie Rätier. Merged with the Bündner Zeitung in 1975	
National-Zeitung	1842	1977	Basel	Basel-Stadt		Formerly the Der Schweizerische Volksfreund. Merged with the Basler Nachrichten to form the Basler Zeitung	
Basler Nachrichten	1844	1977	Basel	Basel-Stadt	Daily	Succeeded the Avis-Blatt and was initially founded as the Allgemeines Intelligenzblatt der Stadt Basel, before changing its name to the Basler Nachrichten aus der Schweiz und für die Schweiz and finally just the Basler Nachrichten. Merged with the National-Zeitung to form the Basler Zeitung	
Berner Nachrichten	1976	1979		Canton of Bern		Merged with the Berner Tagblatt to form the still existing Berner Zeitung	
Die Tat	1935	1978	Zurich	Canton of Zurich	Daily		
Walliser Volksfreund	1920	1989	Brig	Canton of Valais	Weekly		
Nidwaldner Volksblatt	1866	1991		Canton of Nidwalden	Daily	Merged with the Nidwaldner Tagblatt in 1991, to become the Nidwaldner Zeitung, which became a regional version of the Luzerner Zeitung	
Neue Zürcher Nachrichten	1904	1991	Zurich	Canton of Zurich	Daily	Preceded by the Zürcher Nachrichten.	
Badener Tagblatt	1856	1996		Canton of Aargau	Daily	Formerly the Tagblatt der Stadt Baden, succeeded the Neue Eidgenössische Zeitung. Had two local editions, which were the Bremgartner Tagblatt and the Freiämter Nachrichten. Merged alongside the Aargauer Tagblatt into the Aargauer Zeitung	
Zuger Nachrichten	1886	1996	Zug	Canton of Zug	Daily	Had the Neue Zuger Zeitung merged into it in 1891. Merged with the Zuger Zeitung in 1996 to form the Neue Zuger Zeitung, which became a twin edition to the Luzerner Zeitung	
Zuger Zeitung	1966	1996				Successor to the Zuger Volksblatt, formerly the Zuger Tagblatt. Merged with the Zuger Nachrichten in 1996 to form the Neue Zuger Zeitung, which became a twin edition to the Luzerner Zeitung	
Berner Tagwacht	1892	1997	Bern	Canton of Bern	Daily	Socialist paper. Successor to the Der Schweizerische Sozialdemokrat. Succeeded by the Die Hauptstadt	
Neue Bündner Zeitung	1892	1997	Chur	Canton of the Grisons	Daily	Absorbed into Die Südostschweiz	
Die Hauptstadt	1998	1998	Bern	Canton of Bern	Weekly	Successor to the Berner Tagwacht, failed due to financial issues after six months	
Aktiv	1930	1998		Canton of Bern	Monthly	Initially the Der schweizerische Metallarbeiter and then the CMV-Zeitung. Later became a magazine, Syna	
Metropol	2000	2002			Daily	Swiss edition of Metro.	
Die Weltwoche	1933	2002	Zurich	Canton of Zurich	Weekly	Became a magazine in 2002	
Wir Brückenbauer	1942	2004	Zurich	Canton of Zurich	Weekly	Became a magazine and was renamed Migros Magazin in 2004.	
Heute	2006	2008	Zurich	Canton of Zurich	Daily		
.ch	2007	2009	Zurich	Canton of Zurich	Daily		
News	2007	2009			Daily		
Burgdorfer Tagblatt	1911	2012	Burgdorf	Canton of Bern	Five times a week	Ultimate successor to the Berner Volksfreund which started in 1831. Frequently changed publishing format. Merged with the free paper Aemme Zytig in 2004 which used its name until 2012	
Schweiz am Sonntag	2007	2017			Weekly		
Blick am Abend	2008	2018	Zurich	Canton of Zurich	Daily		

=== French language ===
Name	Established	Defunct	City	Canton	Occurrence	Notes	Ref.
Gazette de Berne	1689	1798	Bern	Canton of Bern	Twice weekly	At some times officially titled the Nouvelles de divers endroits and the Nouvelles politiques.	
Bulletin des séances de la Constituante	1839	1839		Canton of Valais	Thrice weekly	Replaced by the Echo des Alpes	
Le Léman	1844	1846	Nyon	Canton of Vaud		Went bankrupt	
Le défenseur de la religion et du peuple	1839	1840		Canton of Valais	Weekly		
Kolokol	1857	1867	Geneva	Canton of Geneva	Weekly	Also in Russian.	
Bulletin de la Fédération jurassienne	1872	1878	La Chaux-de-Fonds	Canton of Neuchâtel	Weekly	One of the first anarchist newspapers in history. Had a 'major role' on the anarchist movement, per historians.	
Le bien public	1879	1888	Fribourg	Canton of Fribourg	Thrice weekly	Merged with the paper Le Chroniqueur Suisse in 1882, after which it became the Le Bien public - Chroniqueur suisse	
Le Bas-Valaisan	1904	1906	Monthey	Canton of Valais	Weekly	Left-wing paper, succeeded by Le Simplon	
Le Simplon	1906	1908		Canton of Valais		Successor to Le Bas-Valaisan	
Le Grutléen	1909	1917	Lausanne	Canton of Vaud	Weekly	Replaced by Le Droit du Peuple	
La Nouvelle Internationale	1917	1921	Geneva	Canton of Geneva	Weekly	Succeeded Le Peuple suisse. Succeeded by l'Avant-garde	
L’Ami du Peuple	1878	1922		Canton of Valais	Twice weekly	Initially located in Fribourg; later changed its name and became L'Ami du Peuple valaisan	
L'Avenir	1921	1923	Monthey	Canton of Valais	Weekly		
La Nation Arabe	1930	1938	Geneva	Canton of Geneva	Monthly		
Le Réveil	1900	1940	Geneva	Canton of Geneva	Bimonthly	Anarchist paper, also published as Le Réveil socialiste-anarchiste, Le Réveil communiste-anarchiste, and Le Réveil anarchiste	
Le Droit du Peuple	1917	1940	Lausanne	Canton of Vaud	Daily	Banned by the Federal Council in 1940	
Le Travail	1922	1940	Geneva	Canton of Geneva	Daily	Formerly La Voix du Travail. Banned by the Federal Council in 1940, though a few secret issues continued after. Succeeded by La Voix ouvrière in 1944 (later the magazine Gauchebdo)	
Le Progrès radical		1940	Château-d'Œx	Canton of Vaud		Journal de Château-d'Œx libéral absorbed it in 1940	
Curieux	1936	1956	Neuchâtel	Canton of Neuchâtel	Weekly		
La Sentinelle	1890	1966	La Chaux-de-Fonds	Canton of Neuchâtel	Daily	Merged in 1966 with Le Peuple to form Le Peuple - La Sentinelle	
Le Peuple	1939	1966			Daily	Merged in 1966 with La Sentinelle to form Le Peuple - La Sentinelle	
Courrier de La Côte	1864	1968	Nyon	Canton of Vaud	Thrice weekly	Merged with the Journal de Nyon in 1968	
Feuille d'Avis de Bulle et de Châtel-Saint-Denis	1908	1969		Canton of Fribourg		Merged into La Gruyère	
Le Peuple - La Sentinelle	1966	1971	La Chaux-de-Fonds	Canton of Neuchâtel	Daily	Formed out of a merger between Le Peuple and La Sentinelle	
Tribune de Lausanne	1879	1984	Lausanne	Canton of Vaud	Daily	Succeeded by Le Matin	
Journal de Nyon	1892	1987	Nyon	Canton of Vaud	Thrice weekly	Merged into the Quotidien de La Côte, later La Côte	
Journal de Château-d'Œx libéral		1989	Château-d'Œx	Canton of Vaud		Replaced in 1989 by the Journal du Pays-d'Enhaut	
Gazette de Lausanne	1798	1991	Geneva	Canton of Geneva	Daily	Merged with the Journal de Genève to form the Journal de Genève et Gazette de Lausanne.	
Journal de Genève	1826	1991	Geneva	Canton of Geneva	Daily	Merged with the Gazette de Lausanne to form the Journal de Genève et Gazette de Lausanne.	
Le Pays	1873	1993	Porrentruy	Canton of Jura	Daily	Merged with Le Démocrate to form Le Quotidien jurassien in 1993	
Le Démocrate	1877	1993	Delémont	Canton of Jura	Daily	Merged with Le Pays to form Le Quotidien jurassien in 1993	
La Suisse	1898	1994	Geneva	Canton of Geneva	Daily	Went bankrupt in 1994	
Journal de Genève et Gazette de Lausanne	1991	1998	Geneva	Canton of Geneva	Daily	Merger from Journal de Genève and the Gazette de Lausanne. Merged with the Le Nouveau Quotidien in 1998 to form Le Temps.	
Le Nouveau Quotidien	1991	1998	Lausanne	Canton of Vaud	Daily	Merged with the Journal de Genève et Gazette de Lausanne in 1998 to form Le Temps.	
Journal du Chablais	1993	2001	Monthey	Canton of Valais	Thrice weekly	Formed out of a merger in 1993, out of the Journal de Bex, Messager des Alpes Echo de la Montagne Journal du Haut-Lac. Was initially a weekly in combination with the papers, which continued to publish independent editions twice weekly. Entirely took over those papers in 1997 as a thrice weekly. Was replaced by the weekly paper Chablais Magazine in 2001.	
Journal de Payerne		2002	Payerne	Canton of Vaud	Twice weekly	Merged with La Broye Hebdo in 2002	
L'Écho romand	1910	2002	Lausanne	Canton of Vaud	Weekly	Founded by abbot Marius Besson in 1910, a Catholic weekly. Formerly L'Écho, renamed L'Écho romand in 1998 to distinguish it from L'Écho Magazine. Ceased publication in July 2002 due to financial problems.	
dimanche.ch	1999	2003			Weekly		
Le Nord Vaudois	1773	2005	Yverdon	Canton of Vaud	Daily	Previously Feuille d'Avis d'Yverdon, Journal du Nord Vaudois. Then La Presse Nord Vaudois. Became a local edition of 24 heures in 2005.	
La Presse Riviera/Chablais	1993	2005	Montreux	Canton of Vaud	Daily	Became a local edition of 24 heures in 2005	
Le Matin Bleu	2005	2009	Lausanne	Canton of Vaud	Daily		
Feuille d'avis d'Avenches		2010	Avenches	Canton of Vaud		Merged with La Broye Hebdo in 2010	
L'Express	1738	2018	Neuchâtel	Canton of Neuchâtel	Daily	Merged with L'Impartial to form ArcInfo. Formerly known as the Feuille d'Avis de Neuchâtel, which merged with a paper called L'Express in 1891, from which it took its title	
L'Impartial	1881	2018	La Chaux-de-Fonds	Canton of Neuchâtel	Daily	Merged with L'Express to form ArcInfo.	
Le Régional	1995	2020	Vevey	Canton of Vaud	Weekly		
Journal de Moudon	1839	2021	Moudon	Canton of Vaud	Weekly	Merged with La Broye Hebdo in 2021	
Le Messager	1916	2025	Châtel-Saint-Denis	Canton of Fribourg	Weekly	published by St. Paul SA	
La Région	2006	2025	Yverdon-les-Bains	Canton of Vaud	Daily	Also known as La Région Nord Vaudois. Went bankrupt; replaced by Le Nord Vaudois	

=== Italian language ===
Name	Established	Defunct	City	Canton	Occurrence	Notes	Ref.
Nuove di diverse corti e paesi	1746	1799	Lugano	Canton of Ticino	Weekly	First Italian language newspaper in Switzerland	
Gazzetta di Lugano		1821	Lugano	Canton of Ticino	Weekly		
Corriere Svizzero				Canton of Ticino		Succeeded by the Osservatore del Ceresio	
Osservatore del Ceresio				Canton of Ticino			
Telegrafo delle Alpi	1800	1806		Canton of Ticino			
L'Amico del Popolo di Mesolcina e Calanca	1880	1882	Grono	Canton of the Grisons	Weekly		
Falce e Martello	1925	1936	Zurich	Canton of Zurich	Weekly		
L'Avanguardia	1920	1951		Canton of Ticino			
Il Dovere	1878	1992		Canton of Ticino	Thrice weekly	Merged with Eco di Locarno to form La Regione	
Eco di Locarno	1935	1992	Locarno	Canton of Ticino	Thrice weekly	Merged with Il Dovere to form La Regione	
Libera Stampa	1913	1993		Canton of Ticino	Daily		
Gazzetta Ticinese	1821	1996	Lugano	Canton of Ticino	Daily	First daily paper in Ticino	
Il San Bernardino	1894	2012	San Bernadino	Canton of the Grisons	Weekly	Changed title to Il S. Bernadino in 1904. Merged into La voce del San Bernardino in 2012	
La voce della Rezia	1926	2012	San Bernadino	Canton of the Grisons	Weekly	Merger of two prior titles. La voce delle valli after 1948. Merged into La voce del San Bernardino in 2012	
La voce del San Bernardino	2012	2017	San Bernadino	Canton of the Grisons	Weekly	Merged into Il Grigione Italiano	

=== Romansh language ===
Name	Established	Defunct	City	Canton	Occurrence	Notes	Ref.
Gazetta ordinaria da Scuol	1700	1724		Canton of the Grisons		First Romansh newspaper	
Grischun Romontsch	1836	1839		Canton of the Grisons			
Amitg della Religiun e della Patria	1838	1839		Canton of the Grisons			
Il Grischun	1856	?		Canton of the Grisons			
Fögl d'Engiadina	1857	1940		Canton of the Grisons		Putèr dialect. Merged with the Gazetta Ladina to form the Fögl Ladin in 1940	
Il Grischun	1905	1916		Canton of the Grisons		The "progressive counterpart" of Gasetta Romontscha	
Gazetta Ladina	1922	1940		Canton of the Grisons		Vallader dialect. Merged with the Fögl d'Engiadina to form the Fögl Ladin in 1940	
Casa paterna	1920	1976		Canton of the Grisons		Merged in 1976 with La Pùnt	
La Pùnt	1951	1976		Canton of the Grisons		Merged in 1976 with Casa paterna	
Casa Paterna/La Pùnt	1976	1997		Canton of the Grisons		Merged into La Quotidiana	
Fögl Ladin	1940	1997		Canton of the Grisons		Created out of a merger between the Fögl d'Engiadina and the Gazetta Ladina. Merged into La Quotidiana	
Gasetta Romontscha	1856	1996		Canton of the Grisons		Nova Gasetta Romonscha from 1857 to 1866. Gasetta Romonscha from 1867 to 1891, subsequently Gasetta Romontscha. Merged into La Quotidiana	

=== Other languages ===
Name	Established	Defunct	City	Canton	Language	Occurrence	Notes	Ref.
Kolokol	1857	1867	Geneva	Canton of Geneva	Russian/French	Weekly		
Narodnoye delo	1868	1870	Geneva	Canton of Geneva	Russian			
Vperyod	1904	1905	Geneva	Canton of Geneva	Russian			
Mizan	1886	1909	Geneva	Canton of Geneva	Turkish	Weekly		

== See also ==
- List of magazines in Switzerland
