= Journal du Jura =

Swiss newspaper

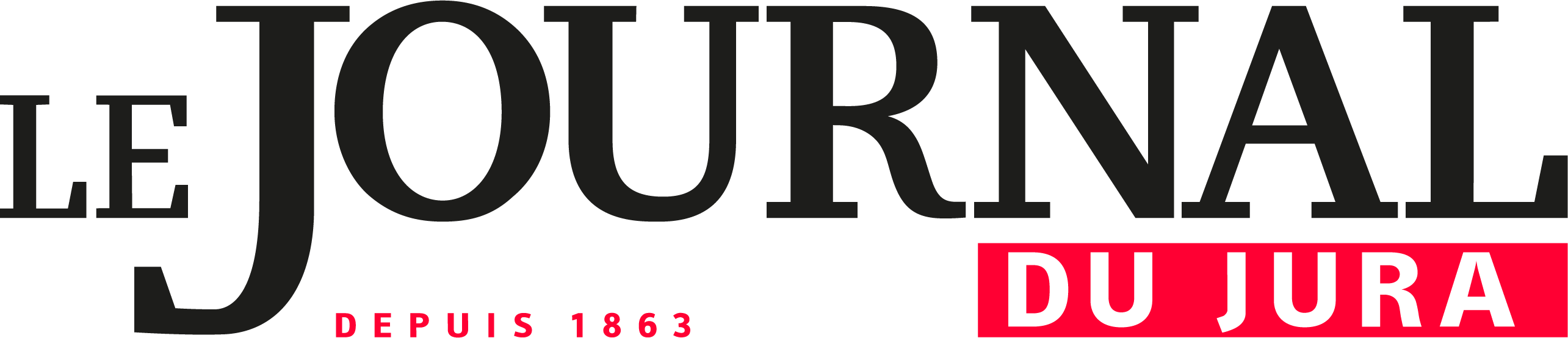
- Type: Daily newspaper
- Owner: Gassman AG
- Founder: Franz Wilhelm Gassmann
- Founded: 1871
- Language: French
- Headquarters: Biel/Bienne, Canton of Bern
- Country: Switzerland
- Circulation: 11,980 (as of 2006)
- Sister newspapers: Bieler Tagblatt
- ISSN: 1424-9626
- OCLC number: 173956424
- Website: www.journaldujura.ch

The Journal du Jura is a French-language Swiss daily newspaper published in Biel/Bienne, Canton of Bern. It was founded in 1871, the successor to two prior papers; in this period it served as an outlet for the Jura Liberals. In 1956, it took over its rival paper, Petit Jurassien. It is the sister newspaper to the German-language paper Bieler Tagblatt.

== History ==
The paper was founded in 1871 by Franz Wilhelm Gassmann. He was a municipal councillor, parish president, member of the Grand Council of Biel, and the Central President of the Grütli Union. It is published by Gassman AG, owned by the Gassman family. They also publish the German-language newspaper the Bieler Tagblatt, which is its sister paper. In doing this they brought together links between Francophone and German-speaking Switzerland.

It was the successor to the Feuille d'Avis founded in 1863, and then the Feuille d'Avis de Bienne et de Neuveville founded in 1868. Early employees of the paper included Nobel Peace Prize winners Élie Ducommun and Albert Gobat. In this early period the paper functioned as an outlet for the liberal political faction in Jura. Its intended audience was the Francophone population of Biel and the Bernese Jura. It is published six days a week. They share a bilingual newsroom and also share television and radio stations. It is published in Bienne. Its coverage mostly focused on cantonal and local news, but also Switzerland as a whole.

Taking over its only rival newspaper, the Moutier paper Petit Jurassien (formerly the Feuille d'Avis du district de Moutier), in 1956, it continued to publish a version of this paper named the Tribune jurassienne until 1996. It also merged with a bilingual Bienne paper called L'Express. Following the merger with L'Express, that paper's editor-in-chief Jean-Pierre Maurer became the Journal du Jura's editor-in-chief, a position he held until his death in 1975. Bernard Eggler was editor-in-chief for nine years, but left in 1994. As of 1995, its editor-in-chief was Mario Sessa. During the Jura separatism struggle the paper voiced opinions of those who wished to stay in the Canton of Bern.

Journal du Jura had a period of good growth from 1985, but like many papers in Switzerland had struggles in the 1990s due to economic and advertising issues. It opened up a new printing centre in 1985, which allowed for four-color printing in the paper. The paper redesigned its format to be more compact in 1993, in order to harmonize its layout with other papers that used the same advertising distribution (including L'Express, L'Impartial, and Le Quotidien Jurassien. It was redesigned again two years later to have instead a more open layout for its text. In the 1990s, it was part of an editorial exchange between several other Swiss regional daily papers, and since February 2007 it has collaborated with ArcInfo (L'Express and L'Impartial), from which it takes national and international news.

For its 150th anniversary in 2015, it published several supplements devoted to the history of the Jura region. Its circulation was 13,000 in 1995, and as of 2006, the paper's circulation was 11,980. Gassman AG was bought out by Fredy Bayard, an entrepreneur from Valais, in 2020. He had previously bought out the publishing company that owned the Walliser Bote two years prior. The paper's archives pre-1996 were made available through the archival service e-newspaperarchives.ch in 2021; no archives of the paper exist for the period of 1871–1875.
