= .ch (newspaper) =

Former Swiss free daily newspaper

- Front page from a 3 April 2008 edition
- Type: Free daily newspaper
- Format: Tabloid
- Owner: Media Punkt AG
- Editor: Rolf Leeb
- Founded: 17 September 2007; 19 years ago
- Ceased publication: 4 May 2009; 17 years ago
- Political alignment: Neutral
- Language: German language
- Headquarters: Zürich
- Country: Switzerland
- Circulation: 430,000
- OCLC number: 611205947
- Website: punkt.ch (former website; in German)

.ch (.ch; spoken: Punkt CH) was a Swiss German-language free daily newspaper, published in the tabloid format by Media Punkt AG in Zürich between 2007 and 2009.

== History ==
Media Punkt AG first published the paper on 19 September 2007. The newspaper's name comes from .ch, the Internet's country code top-level domain for Switzerland.

With a claimed initial print run of 435,000, it was one of the largest daily newspapers in Switzerland, according to 2006 statistics. The newspaper was distributed directly to homes in Basel, Bern, Lucerne, St. Gallen and Zürich. It competed mainly with other free newspapers in Switzerland including 20 Minuten, heute and the News.

The newspaper's editor-in-chief was Rolf Leeb.

The newspaper's chief executive officer was Caroline Thoma.

It ceased publication, because of poor economic performance, with the last issue on 4 May 2009. All 69 employees of the newspaper were laid off.

== See also ==
- List of free daily newspapers
