= Watson (newspaper) =

Swiss online newspaper

Coordinates: 47.3875203°N 8.5190299°E

- News ohne Bla Bla
- Type: Online newspaper
- Founder: Hansi Voigt
- Publisher: CH Media
- Editor-in-chief: Nadine Sommerhalder
- Founded: 22 January 2014; 12 years ago
- Language: German; French
- Headquarters: Zurich
- Country: Switzerland
- Readership: German-speaking Switzerland: 1'131'870; French-speaking Switzerland: 305'606
- Website: www.watson.ch (in German)

Watson is a Swiss online newspaper published by CH Media. It publishes articles in German and French and is targeted towards mobile users.

== History ==
Watson was launched on 22 January 2014 by the start-up company FixxPunkt AG with funding from Peter Wanner (AZ Medien). Founder and editor-in-chief was former 20 Minuten editor-in-chief Hansi Voigt. In April 2016, Voigt announced his departure from the newspaper, he was succeeded by Michael Wanner, Peter Wanners son, as director and by Maurice Thiriet as editor-in-chief.

In 2023, CH Media became the majority owner of the FixxPunkt AG. After which Nadine Sommerhalder became the new editor-in-chief, Maurice Thiriet became the new director and Michael Wanner became the CEO of CH Media.

== Watson Romandy ==
In March 2021, Watson opened its French publishing branch for the Romandy in Lausanne.

== Watson Germany ==
On 22 March 2018, a licensed version for Germany was launched by Ströer.
