= Paul Ray Ramsey =

American political vlogger, YouTuber and public speaker

Paul R. Ramsey
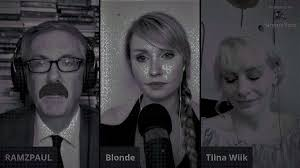
- Born: 1963 (age 62–63); Chicago, Illinois, United States
- Other names: ramzpaul, RamZPaul
- Education: Colorado State University
- Occupations: Vlogger, YouTube personality, public speaker

Paul Ray Ramsey (also known as ramzpaul and RamZPaul, born 1963) is an American far-right vlogger, YouTube personality, and public speaker.

The New York Times has described Ramsey as a "popular alt-right internet personality", and the Swiss newspaper Basellandschaftliche Zeitung identified him as an important representative of the alt-right. Media Matters for America, The Forward, and the Southern Poverty Law Center have called Ramsey a white nationalist. He spoke at the 2013 conference held by the online magazine American Renaissance. Ramsey replied to a question posed by Matthew Heimbach at the conference about the creation of a whites only state: "We need to Balkanize and create our own homeland. We have a right to exist."

== Activities ==
Ramsay began pseudonymously posting YouTube videos under the handle RamZPaul starting in 2009. He posted humorous video rants. By 2016, Ramsay had added a larger amount of explicitly alt-right content to his channel, such as the Cultural Marxism conspiracy theory.

In November 2016, Ramsey was a featured speaker at a conference held by the white supremacist National Policy Institute (NPI). The NPI was founded by Richard B. Spencer, who also is generally credited with coining the term alt-right. After video emerged of several conference attendees giving the Nazi salute during a speech by Spencer, Ramsey disassociated himself from the NPI founder, as well as the term alt-right, saying, "You don't want to tie your brand to something that's ultimate evil." Ramsey was listed as a speaker for the 2018 Awakening conference in Helsinki, a self-described "ethno-nationalist" conference.
