= The Good Liar =

2019 film directed by Bill Condon

- Theatrical release poster
- Directed by: Bill Condon
- Screenplay by: Jeffrey Hatcher
- Based on: The Good Liar by Nicholas Searle
- Produced by: Bill Condon; Greg Yolen
- Starring: Helen Mirren; Ian McKellen; Russell Tovey; Jim Carter; Stefan Kalipha
- Cinematography: Tobias A. Schliessler
- Edited by: Virginia Katz
- Music by: Carter Burwell
- Production companies: New Line Cinema; Bron Creative; 1000 Eyes
- Distributed by: Warner Bros. Pictures
- Release dates: October 28, 2019 (BFI Southbank); November 8, 2019 (United Kingdom); November 15, 2019 (United States)
- Running time: 109 minutes
- Countries: United Kingdom; United States
- Language: English
- Budget: $10 million
- Box office: $33.9 million

The Good Liar is a 2019 crime thriller film directed and produced by Bill Condon and written by Jeffrey Hatcher, based on the 2015 novel The Good Liar by Nicholas Searle. It stars Ian McKellen as a career con artist who meets a wealthy widow (Helen Mirren) online, and then discovers that his plan to steal her fortune has unexpected roadblocks.

The film premiered at the BFI Southbank in London on October 28, 2019. It was released by Warner Bros. Pictures in the United Kingdom on November 8, 2019, and in the United States on November 15, 2019. It received mixed reviews from critics and grossed $33 million against a budget of $10 million.

== Plot ==
Roy Courtnay is an aging British con artist who manipulates people into giving him access to their finances utilising a string of false identities.

In 2009, Roy targets Betty McLeish, who has over £2 million in savings. One night he meets her for a date in London, then feigns a bad knee to get an invitation to stay at her house. Roy soon encourages Betty to open a joint offshore investment account with him.

At the same time, Roy and his partner Vincent Halloran run an investment scam with their mark Bryn and his associate Beni by employing fake Russian investors. One of the pretend Russians, actually the butcher Vlad, demands a greater cut of the take; in response, Roy orders thugs to break Vlad's hand.

Later, Bryn realizes he has been robbed, so goes to confront Roy during Roy's shopping trip with Betty in the city. When Roy notices Bryn following him, he sends her into the shops before luring him into Charing Cross tube station. He stabs Bryn, shoving him in front of an incoming train.

Roy and Betty go on holiday to Berlin. Betty's grandson Stephen takes them to a flat Roy recognises. Stephen reveals that "Roy Courtnay"— a young British Army officer — was killed there in 1948 by a Nazi war criminal he was tracking, according to Soviet records.

Roy narrates an elaborate story of his mission in Germany, at first explaining that his German translator Hans Taub was present in their last mission, which ended in Hans' death. When Stephen refuses to believe this, Roy admits that he is actually Hans and stole Roy's identity to reinvent himself to leave Germany. Betty accepts his explanation and dismisses Stephen's objections.

Roy and Betty plan to transfer their money into the joint account. Vincent suggests Roy leave at least some of the money for Betty to help with her medical condition, but Roy dismisses the idea, insisting on leaving Betty financially ruined, like their previous victims. Vincent reluctantly complies and later participates in the transactions necessary for the couple to transfer their money into the joint account. However, after leaving Betty and returning to his flat, Roy discovers that he no longer has the keypad needed to access the account. Roy returns to Betty's house to reclaim it, only to find Betty waiting for him and that all the house contents have been removed.

Betty attempts to force Roy's confession, before revealing her identity and personal history are fake. Her real name is Lili Schroeder and they knew each other as German teenagers. In 1943, Hans was tutoring her in English. On their last session, after trying unsuccessfully to kiss one of her sisters, Hans raped Lili.

After her parents dismissed him from continuing his lessons because of the attempted kiss, Hans denounced Lili's father as a traitor so he was executed by the Nazis. This drove Lili's mother to suicide. Later on, Lili's sisters died in a bomb blast two weeks before Adolf Hitler's death. After the war ended, Lili suffered at the hands of the Russians, learning to be a good liar for survival. Eventually, she made her way to England.

After recounting their past, Betty explains to Roy that she has been fully aware of his plan to con her all along. Stephen, is in fact the partner of Lili's real grandson Michael, tracked Roy/Hans' criminal history, confirming his identity with a DNA test using a locket from Betty/Lili's childhood that contained a piece of Hans' hair. She also reveals that Vincent has betrayed Roy after being blackmailed by Stephen.

Betty empties their joint account, leaving Roy only to pay back the victims of his last con. As she prepares to leave the house, he locks the door and attacks her. Betty ultimately fends him off before Beni and Vlad confront Roy in retribution for his earlier con.

Betty then leaves the house as Roy, refusing to pay his clients back, is consequently beaten up. Weeks later, Roy – having suffered a stroke during the fight – is in hospital, unable to speak or move. Vincent pays him a visit. Elsewhere, Betty lives happily with her extended family.

== Cast ==
- Helen Mirren as Betty McLeish/Lili Schroeder
  - Nell Williams as Lili (1943)
- Ian McKellen as Roy Courtnay/Hans Taub
  - Phil Dunster as young Roy
  - Laurie Davidson as Hans (1948)
  - Spike White as young Hans
- Russell Tovey as Stephen
- Jim Carter as Vincent Halloran
- Mark Lewis Jones as Bryn
- Lucian Msamati as Beni
- Jóhannes Haukur Jóhannesson as Vlad
- Tunji Kasim as Michael
- Céline Buckens as Annalise
- Bessie Carter as Secretary
- Stefan Kalipha as Roger (Uncredited)

== Production ==
In March 2018, it was announced that Bill Condon would direct the film, with Ian McKellen and Helen Mirren cast in the leading roles. In April 2018, Russell Tovey and Jim Carter joined the cast.

Principal production commenced on April 23, 2018, in London, England. The film was also shot in Berlin, Germany.

=== Music ===
The score is composed by Carter Burwell and released through WaterTower Music on November 8, 2019.

== Release ==
The film's world premiere was held on October 28, 2019, at the BFI Southbank in London. It was released on November 8, 2019, in the United Kingdom, and on November 15, 2019, in the United States.

== Reception ==
=== Box office ===
The Good Liar grossed $17.2 million in the United States and Canada, and $16.2 million in other territories, for a worldwide total of $33.4 million, against a production budget of $10 million.

In the United States and Canada, the film was released alongside Charlie's Angels and Ford v Ferrari, and was projected to gross around $5 million from 2,439 theaters in its opening weekend. It made $1.6 million on its first day and went on to debut to $5.6 million, finishing seventh at the box office. It fell 40% to $3.6 million in its second weekend, finishing in tenth.

=== Critical response ===
Rotten Tomatoes reported that 64% of critics have given the film a positive review based on 165 reviews, with an average rating of 6.2/10. The website's critics consensus reads, "The Good Liar is less than the sum of its prestigious parts, but Ian McKellen and Helen Mirren keep the proceedings consistently watchable." On Metacritic, the film has a weighted average score of 55 out of 100 based on 31 critics, indicating "mixed or average reviews". Audiences polled by CinemaScore gave the film an average grade of "B" on an A+ to F scale, while those surveyed at PostTrak gave it 4 out of 5 stars, with 56% saying they would definitely recommend it. The Guardian included it in a list of the most underrated films of 2019.

In his review for The Wall Street Journal Joe Morgenstern wrote, ""The Good Liar" is calculation from arch start to hollow finish." Ben Kenigsberg of The New York Times commented, "The sleight of hand "The Good Liar" tries to pull off might be easier to keep hidden on the page. As it progresses, the film reveals complications (it plays particularly dubious tricks with the way it parcels out flashbacks to the 1940s) and a motive that might as well have been picked out of a hat. The finale could be written with entirely different details, and almost no scene preceding it would have to change. The real good liar is whoever convinced Mirren and McKellen to class up such thin and arbitrary material." Peter Sobczynski writing for RogerEbert.com gave the movie two and half stars out of four and stated, "...it quickly becomes apparent that this is one of those stories where nothing is quite as it seems, and leading to a shocking revelation that most will see coming, at least in the broad strokes. A film of this sort needs an airtight plot—or at least airtight enough to keep you from questioning things as it is running—but there are a few too many instances in which characters say and do things solely because the plot requires them to do so." Sandra Hall of The Sydney Morning Herald gave the film three and half stars out of five and noted, "...as a result, there's not much suspense. It's an enthralling exercise but a peculiarly cerebral one – a psychological thriller without the thrills." The Guardian's Wendy Ide gave the film three stars out of five, stating, "...The Good Liar is at its sparky best when Mirren and McKellen are on screen, waltzing smoothly through a plot that feels like a Russian doll of deeper and deeper deceptions. Flashes of violence are effectively jarring when juxtaposed with the chintzy cosiness of much of the film. Less successful are two thudding, lead-weight flashbacks, which disgorge chunks of exposition and quash some of the fun in McKellen and Mirren's deft double act." Elizabeth Weitzman of TheWrap said, "There's only one truly unpredictable twist in "The Good Liar," and that's the disappointment audiences are likely to feel when they leave the theater."

The Adelaide Review gave the movie 7/10 points, noting, "Helen and Ian's first film together (although they've previously appeared as a double-act on the stage), this has an especially complex and even unpleasant performance by him, but she's no slouch too, and it's good to see Tovey holding his own in scenes alongside these two 'national treasures'. And yes, as Helen's Betty would say, "It's so English!"" In his review for Rolling Stone, David Fear gave the film two stars out of five and wrote, "The real question is: Are you willing to endure all of that random swerving for the simple pleasure of these performers' company? Both actors are, unsurprisingly, bending over backwards here to sell these characters and establish enough screen chemistry to smooth over a lot of rough patches... They play off each other beautifully despite the material, and they get a chance to indulge in the aforementioned range of sound and fury. Yes, you would watch these two in virtually anything. You just wish it wasn't this. They deserve something sturdier and far less head-slappingly preposterous, and that's the truth." Jon Frosch of The Hollywood Reporter added, "An example of the kind of middlebrow, classily accoutered "cinema for adults" that's grown rare in the Age of Marvel, the film may pique the interest of viewers of a certain age; there's a comfy pleasure in watching these two pros patter back and forth in plummy accents, clutching mugs of tea or sipping flutes of champagne. Yet The Good Liar's sophistication is nothing if not skin-deep. For all its nasty twists and turns, its fake-outs and flashbacks and cheekily preposterous pile-up of double-crosses, this story of an elderly con man and the wealthy widow he targets feels fatally devoid of danger. Square, tame and tidy as the London-area house kept by Mirren's primly elegant, creamy-complexioned septuagenarian, The Good Liar is a work of skill but little spark." Le News gave the film three stars out of four, stating. "Two superb actors from the grand culture of English drama – Helen Mirren and Ian McKellen – are enough reason to pull you into this intriguing tale of deception... If you're looking for quality entertainment with an absorbing script, multiple twists and great acting, this is your film. Not a masterpiece, but captivating and satisfying."

David Hughes of Empire gave the film three stars out of five, commenting, "...even if you know what's coming, there's joy in watching two flawless performances from these much-loved veteran actors, relishing every nuance of their characters, and every moment of their time on screen. They're so good, in fact, that the film flags every time one or both of them are off screen, such as during the flashback sequences, with which a more daring adaptation might have dispensed... It may be a shaggy-dog story, with occasional lapses into melodrama, but Mirren and McKellen are on sparkling form, and when a film aimed primarily at pensioners employs both the C-word and gory injury detail, you can't accuse it of being boring." David Ehrlich of IndieWire stated, "...it's Mirren who's ultimately asked to carry this movie across the finish line, and she does so with oodles of her signature elan. It's a rare actor who can split the difference between an airport thriller and a historical reckoning — who's able to conflate the silly with the serious in a way that completely erases the difference — but Mirren is more than up to the challenge. The final stretches of Condon's film are so ludicrous that you almost feel swindled for caring about the movie until that point, but Mirren grounds one plot twist after another with the gravity of her conviction (and a little help from Carter Burwell's lilting, uneasy, "Mr. Holmes"-esque score). "The Good Liar" may not have much to say about redemption, entrapment, or the fibs that can hold a friendship together, but the past is only so important to a wicked little thriller that delights in the moment at hand." Jess Layt of Hawkesbury Gazette gave the movie 5.5/10 points, commenting, "This is a story gives older actors some genuine character work, an actual story and motivations and a life. That being said, the way The Good Liar plays out in its final act feels like a bit of a hoodwink in itself. Audiences have been following these characters for a good chunk of film, only to have odd backstories suddenly revealed for which there is no apparent foreshadowing... The Good Liar, much like its protagonist, talks big game but is really just confused about its identity and place in the world."

=== Accolades ===
Award	Date of ceremony	Category	Recipient(s)	Result	Ref(s)
AARP Movies for Grownups Awards	January 19, 2020	Best Actress	Helen Mirren	Nominated	
Alliance of Women Film Journalists	2020	Actress Defying Age and Ageism	Helen Mirren	Nominated	
Satellite Awards	December 19, 2019	Best Actress, Drama	Helen Mirren	Nominated	
Saturn Awards	2021	Best Action or Adventure Film	The Good Liar	Nominated	
The Queerties	February 26, 2020	Film Performance	Ian McKellen	Nominated	
