= WEMF =

WEMF may refer to:

- WEMF AG für Werbemedienforschung, a Swiss media company
- World Electronic Music Festival, an electronic music event held annually in Canada
