= Stanley Steemer =

American carpet cleaning company

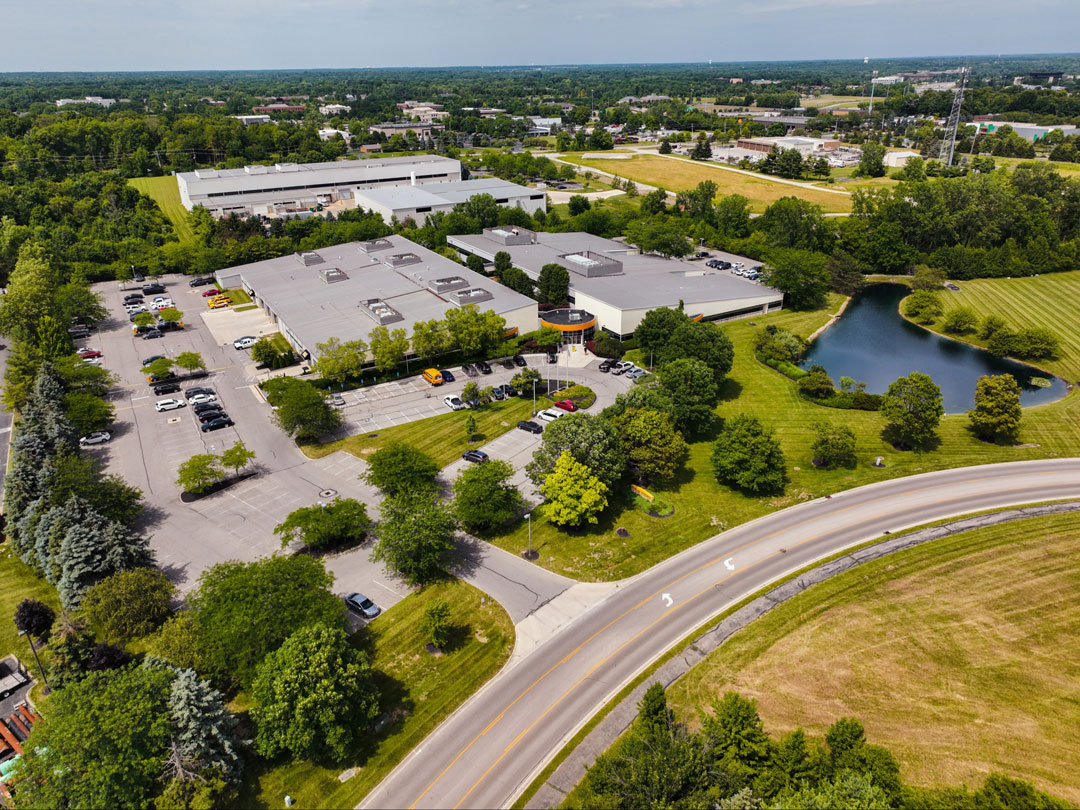
- Stanley Steemer headquarters (Dublin, Ohio)
- Type: Private
- Industry: Carpet cleaning
- Founded: 1947
- Headquarters: Dublin, Ohio, United States
- Area served: United States
- Website: stanleysteemer.com

Stanley Steemer is an American company that provides carpet cleaning, tile and grout cleaning, upholstery cleaning, hardwood floor cleaning and air duct cleaning. The company also does water damage restoration and sells a line of cleaning products for home and office use.

The company has over 280 corporate-owned and franchised locations in 49 states.

== History ==
Stanley Steemer was founded by Jack Bates in Columbus, Ohio in 1947 as the Jack Bates Carpet Cleaning Company. In 1970, Jack's son Wesley graduated from Wittenberg University and went to work with his father. They built their own steam cleaner, dubbed the Stanley Steemer. The company was incorporated as Stanley Steemer International, Inc. in 1972.

A friend of Wesley's that bought a franchise in Springfield, Ohio, came up with the company's distinctive yellow and black vans based on his high school alma mater.

In 1985, Wesley Bates was named president and CEO of Stanley Steemer. In January 2007, Wesley's son Justin Bates was named president.

In February 2013, Stanley Steemer earned Asthma and Allergy Friendly Certification for their professional cleaning services. In March 2014, the company introduced an area-rug cleaning service with a new facility in New York.

In February 2023, Stanley Steemer suffered a data breach that affected 67,000 customers. The Play hacker group took responsibility for the attack.

== Sponsorship ==
The company sponsors the NASCAR "30-lap Stanley Steemer NASCAR Late Model" race held at Rockford Speedway in Rockford, Illinois.
