= Lorena Parini =

Swiss political scientist

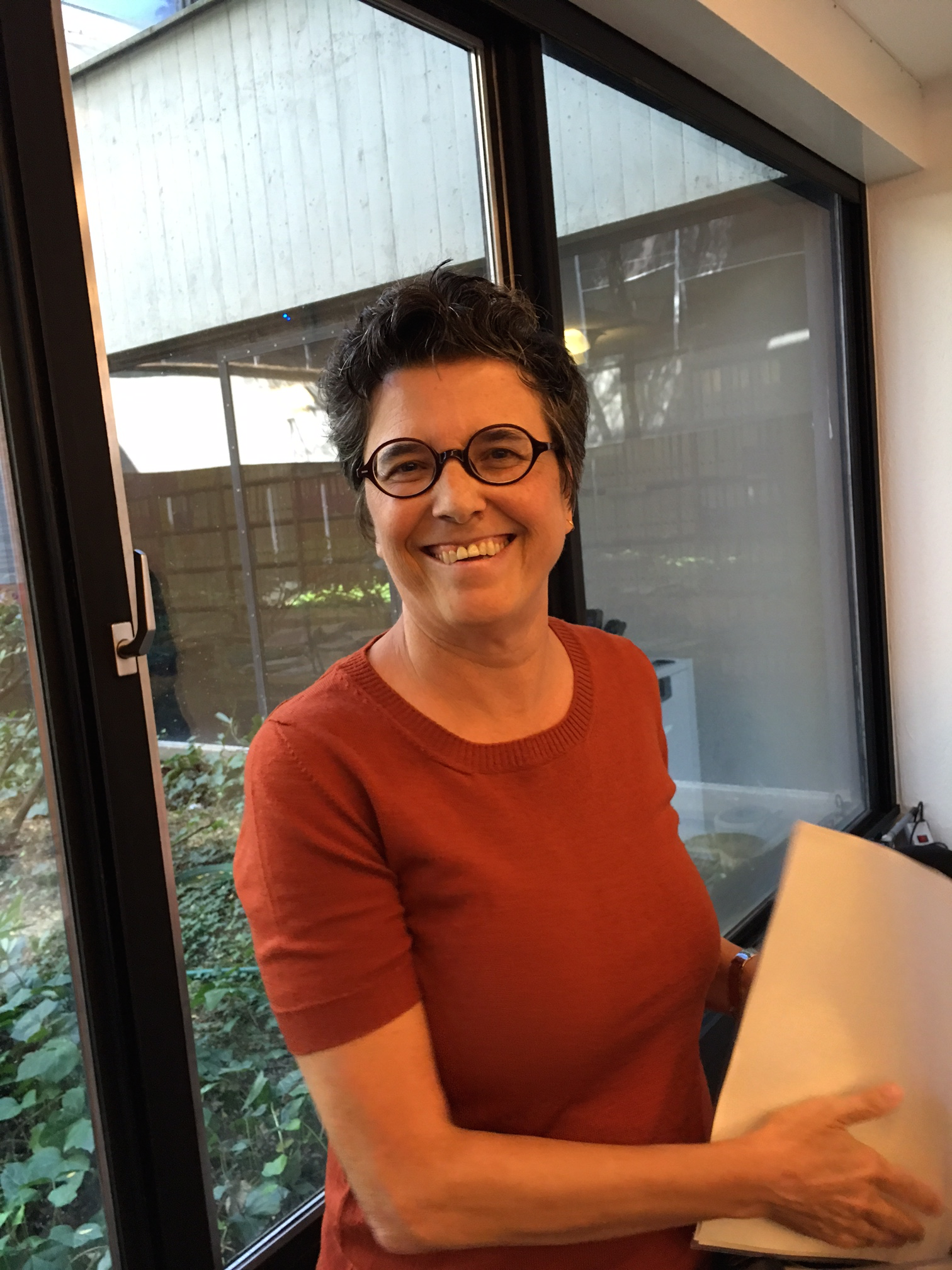
- Education: University of Geneva
- Scientific career
- Fields: Political science; Gender studies
- Workplaces: University of Geneva

Lorena Parini is a Swiss political scientist and gender studies scholar. She is a professor at the University of Geneva. She studies gender and politics, political discrimination against LGBT people, and the role and construction of social identities.

== Career ==
Parini attended the University of Geneva, graduating in 1988 with a bachelor's degree in political science. She continued to study political science at the University of Geneva, obtaining a graduate diploma in 1992 and a doctorate in economic and social sciences with a focus on political science. Her dissertation was conducted under the supervision of Paolo Urio, and was called La théorie des systèmes auto-organisés et les phénomènes socio-politiques. Etude de cas: la politique d'asile en Suisse.

Since completing her PhD, Parini has been affiliated with the University of Geneva. From 2001 to 2002, Parini took a leave to direct research at the Center For Women's Studies at the University of York.

In 1997, Parini wrote La Politique d'asile en Suisse. Une perspective systémique, in which she studies the politics of asylum in Switzerland. In 2006, she published the book Le système de genre: introduction aux concepts et théories, which is an introduction to the study of the social construction and role of gender.

Parini has worked with LGBT organisations, including as the co-president of the federation of LGBT associations of Geneva. She has researched and written publicly about the rights and political situation of LGBT people, and has conducted survey research on workplace discrimination against LGBT people in Switzerland.

Parini has been cited or interviewed, largely on topics to do with LGBT and gender studies, in media outlets including Le Temps, Radio Télévision Suisse and Radio Lac (fr), the Tribune de Genève, and 20 Minuten. Parini also performs as a DJ under the names DJ LAP and DJ Lorena.

== Selected works ==
- La Politique d'asile en Suisse. Une perspective systémique (1997)
- Le système de genre: introduction aux concepts et théories (2006)
