= Le Matin Bleu =

Defunct Swiss French-language newspaper

- Type: Free daily newspaper
- Format: Tabloid
- Owner: Edipresse
- Founded: 31 October 2005
- Ceased publication: 24 September 2009; 16 years ago
- Language: Swiss French
- Headquarters: Lausanne
- Country: Switzerland
- Circulation: 100,000 (2005)
- Sister newspapers: Le Matin
- OCLC number: 716842896
- Website: lematinbleu.ch (in French)

Le Matin Bleu (transl. The Blue Morning) was a Swiss French-language free daily newspaper, published by Edipresse in Lausanne between 2005 and 2009.

== History ==
A tabloid-format newspaper, Le Matin Bleu was first published on 31 October 2005, and had an initial print run of 100,000 copies. It was launched in anticipation of 20 minutes, the French-language edition of 20 Minuten, starting 8 March 2006, both of which are also free daily newspapers. The two papers competed for the same audience.

The newspaper was distributed in the most-populated areas of Romandy. While it shared its name with the daily newspaper Le Matin, also published by Edipresse, it was edited independently.

On 25 September 2009, the newspaper ceased publication because of the merger of Edipresse and Tamedia, which was already publishing 20 minutes. Le Matin Bleu was also operating with heavy losses; Switzerland's competition watchdog considered that Le Matin Bleu would have likely been eliminated from the market merge or not.

== See also ==
- List of free daily newspapers
