= Schweiz am Sonntag =

Weekly newspaper published in Switzerland

- Type: Weekly newspaper (Sundays)
- Founder: AZ Medien
- Editor-in-chief: Patrik Müller
- Founded: 16 September 2007; 18 years ago
- Ceased publication: 26 February 2017
- Language: German
- Country: Switzerland
- Circulation: 182,316 (2016)
- ISSN: 2296-3219
- OCLC number: 896805225

The Schweiz am Sonntag (transl. Switzerland on Sunday) was a Swiss German-language weekly newspaper, published on Sundays with the main circulation areas being the Swiss Plateau and southeastern Switzerland. It was published from 2007 to 2017.

== History ==
In the autumn of 2007, the newspaper was founded by AZ Medien under the name Sonntag. On 26 September 2010, the newspaper changed its name to Der Sonntag. On March 24, 2013, the newspaper was renamed to Schweiz am Sonntag, as it was also the Sunday edition of Die Südostschweiz. The editorial consisted of approximately thirty-five people, with Patrik Müller as the editor-in-chief.

Editor-in-chief Patrik Müller published an article on 17 August 2014 alleging that Baden mayor Geri Müller had abused his office while sexting during work hours. The Schweizer Presserat (Swiss Press Council) condemned Schweiz am Sonntag in 2016 for violating Müller's privacy, and AZ Medien settled with Müller in 2018.

On 26 February 2017, the last edition of Schweiz am Sonntag was published. Instead, since 4 March 2017, AZ Medien has published a fully-fledged Saturday edition of the Aargauer Zeitung titled Schweiz am Wochenende. The reasoning given for the discontinuation of the newspaper was lower advertising revenue, alongside high costs for printing and distribution.
