= L'Impartial =

Daily newspaper in Switzerland

- Type: Daily newspaper
- Owner(s): Société neuchâteloise de presse SA
- Founder(s): Alexandre Courvoisier
- Founded: 1881
- Language: Swiss French
- Headquarters: La Chaux-de-Fonds, Canton of Neuchâtel
- Country: Switzerland
- Sister newspapers: L'Express
- ISSN: 1053-3222
- OCLC number: 22333479
- Website: www.limpartial.ch

L'Impartial (lit. 'The Impartial') was a Swiss French language daily newspaper published by Société neuchâteloise de presse SA in La Chaux-de-Fonds, Canton of Neuchâtel. Published since 1881, it was a sister newspaper to L'Express. The last edition of the newspaper was published on 22 January 2018. It merged with L'Express to create ArcInfo.

== History ==
The paper was founded by Alexandre Courvoisier in 1881 in La Chaux-de-Fonds. The publisher of the paper took over the Le Locle paper Feuille d'Avis des Montagnes in 1967, giving its publisher a monopoly of journalism in the northern part of the canton. In 1992, Gassman AG (owner of the Bieler Tagblatt and Journal du Jura newspapers) bought a majority of shares in L'Impartial.

In 1996, it partially merged with another Neuchâtel newspaper, L'Express. Afterwards, the two papers shared much of the same content and an editorial team, but differed in some of their regional coverage. No jobs were lost at either paper in the process of the merger. The publishing companies behind both papers merged in 1999, forming the Société neuchâteloise de presse SA.

It merged with L'Express to create ArcInfo in 2018. This was announced in August 2017 in an op-ed printed in both papers by the co-editor-in-chief Stéphane Devaux, who said things would change at the papers and that they were "in the middle of a vast project", opening up the possibility of merging their distribution. The name ArcInfo was the name already used for the online versions of both publications. The last edition of the newspaper was published on 22 January 2018. In 2005 its circulation was 16,530.
