= Bieler Tagblatt =

Swiss daily newspaper

- Type: Daily newspaper
- Owner: Gassman AG
- Founder: Franz Wilhelm Gassmann
- Founded: 1850 (as Seeländer Bote)
- Language: Swiss Standard German
- Headquarters: Biel/Bienne, Canton of Bern
- Country: Switzerland
- Circulation: 28,745 distribution 67,000 readership (by WEMF AG, 2006)
- Sister newspapers: Journal du Jura
- ISSN: 1424-9618
- OCLC number: 173956431
- Website: www.bielertagblatt.ch

Bieler Tagblatt is a Swiss Standard German language daily newspaper, published by Gassmann AG in Biel/Bienne, Canton of Bern. It was founded in 1850 as the Seeländer Bote, which merged in 1904 with two other papers, the Tagblatt für die Stadt Biel and the Seeländer Nachrichten, to form the current title. It is the sister newspaper of the French-language paper Journal du Jura.

== History and operations ==
It was established in 1850 under the name Seeländer Bote by printer Franz Wilhelm Gassmann. Early on, it was published three times a week. It is published by Gassman AG, owned by the Gassman family. They also publish the French-language newspaper Journal du Jura, its sister paper. In doing this they brought together links between Francophone and German-speaking Switzerland.

In June 1904, the Seeländer Bote was merged with two other papers, the Tagblatt für die Stadt Biel and the Seeländer Nachrichten, to form the Bieler Tagblatt. The new paper had its first issue 7 June 1904; the paper continued to use Seeländer Bote as its subtitle until 1998. A separate edition of the paper was titled Seeländer Bote - Bieler Tagblatt, published from 1904 to 1919. It switched to daily publication in 1904.

While initially conservative, it began to lean more politically liberal in the 1970s. The paper switched from Fraktur typeface to Antiqua, which was more legible, in 1954. The next year, it took over the Express paper. It has been the only German-language paper in Biel since 1966, following the cessation of publication of the Seeländer Volkszeitung, a social democrat paper. Gassman AG was bought out by Fredy Bayard, an entrepreneur from Valais, in 2020. He had previously bought out the publishing company that owned the Walliser Bote two years prior.

In 2004 the paper's circulation was 32,134 copies. The newspaper's estimated readership in 2013 was 54,000 according to WEMF AG. The paper's archives from 1905–1995 were made available through the archival service e-newspaperarchives.ch in 2022.
