= CH Media =

Swiss media company

CH Media Holding AG
- Founded: October 1, 2018
- Headquarters: Aarau (Aargau), Switzerland
- Revenue: CHF 500 million
- Owner: Peter Wanner
- Number of employees: 2000
- Website: chmedia.ch

CH Media is a Swiss media company which was founded in 2018 as a joint venture of the AZ Medien and the NZZ Media Group. It has about 2000 employees and generates sales of almost CHF 500 million.

== History ==
On December 7, 2017, AZ Medien and the NZZ Media Group announced the formation of the joint venture, which is owned equally by both groups. The two media companies contributed their regional newspapers and associated online portals as well as their radio and television stations to the new CH Media company. AZ Medien's magazines were also added to the network. The NZZ Media Group contributed its entire regional media business. Printing plants such as Mittelland Zeitungsdruck, NZZ Media Services and Vogt-Schild as well as all employees and managers in the above-mentioned areas of both media groups were also transferred to the new company. The NZZ Media and Business Media divisions of the NZZ Media Group, including the Neue Zürcher Zeitung and NZZ am Sonntag, are not part of the merger.

== Media ==
The joint venture reaches about 2 million people with all its media.

=== Newspapers ===
CH Media publishes six regional newspapers from AZ Medien and two from NZZ Media Group. Including their head pages, these are around 20 paid newspapers in 15 German-speaking cantons with a paid circulation of almost 370,000 copies and a reach of around 1 million readers:

- az Aargauer Zeitung Aarau (with editions for Brugg, the Freiamt and the Fricktal as well as a remote edition)
  - az Badener Tagblatt
  - az Limmattaler Zeitung
- az Solothurner Zeitung
- az Grenchner Tagblatt
- ot Oltner Tagblatt
- bz Basellandschaftliche Zeitung
- bz Basel

Together with the cooperation partner Zofinger Tagblatt, these newspapers and regional editions form az Nordwestschweiz and are published as printed daily newspapers and online.

- Luzerner Zeitung, until June 2019 with Zentralschweiz am Sonntag
  - Zuger Zeitung
  - Nidwaldner Zeitung
  - Obwaldner Zeitung
  - Urner Zeitung
- St. Galler Tagblatt, with editions for the regions St. Gallen, Gossau and Rorschach, until June 2019 with Ostschweiz am Sonntag
  - Thurgauer Zeitung
  - Toggenburger Tagblatt
  - Appenzeller Zeitung
  - Wiler Zeitung
  - Werdenberger & Obertoggenburger
- Schweiz am Wochenende: Launched in 2007, the Sunday newspaper, which was published from 2013 to 2017 together with Südostschweiz Medien with eight regional editions under the title Switzerland on Sonntag, was replaced from February 2017 by Schweiz am Wochenende, which is published every Saturday. Since July 2019, its cover has also been used by the St. Galler Tagblatt and the Luzerner Zeitung as a replacement for their Sunday newspapers Ostschweiz am Sonntag and Zentralschweiz am Sonntag

=== Television ===
- Tele M1
- Tele Bärn
- TeleZüri
- 3+
- 3+ Adrenalin
- 3+ Crime
- 3+ Emotion
- 3+ Family / Nickelodeon
- 3+ Focus
- 3+ Movies
- 3+ Series
- Tele 1
- TVO
- Belcom AG (marketing company)

=== Radio ===
- Radio Argovia
- Radio 24
- Radio FM1
- Radio Pilatus
- Radio Melody
- Virgin Radio Hits Switzerland
- Virgin Radio Rock Switzerland

On July 1, 2018, AZ Medien and the NZZ Media Group returned the licences of their four radio stations Radio Argovia and Radio 24 (AZ Medien) as well as Radio FM1 and Radio Pilatus (NZZ Media Group), which enabled their transfer to CH Media.

=== Online ===
All online portals of the newspapers concerned were also integrated into the new company. One exception is the online newspaper Watson, which still needs entrepreneurial freedom as a start-up company, but could be integrated later.

== Management ==
Peter Wanner is President of the board of directors of CH Media (Vice chairman Jörg Schnyder, chief financial officer of the NZZ Media Group), Axel Wüstmann is CEO of AZ Medien (deputy chairman Jürg Weber, Head of the NZZ Regional Media), and journalistic director is the former journalistic director of the NZZ regional media, Pascal Hollenstein.

== 2023 cyberattack ==
In March 2023, the hack of NZZ by the cybercriminal group Play led to the penetration of CH Media's systems, which enabled hackers to extract and publish address data of over 400,000 Swiss expatriates subscribing to the official newspaper Schweizer Revue, one of the company's IT clients. According to Swissinfo, this data, which was handled by the Federal Department of Foreign Affairs, was considered so sensitive that the newspaper's distributor wasn't given access to it.

== Critique ==
It is controversially judged whether the merger would lead to a strengthening of the alleged "unity circle" in the Swiss media or, thanks to a powerful editorial staff that has the time and the financial means to be able to research precisely the opposite (Pascal Hollenstein at the media conference). Mergers actually strengthened critical journalism (Kurt W. Zimmermann).
