= News (newspaper) =

Swiss German-language free daily newspaper

- Type: Free daily newspaper
- Format: Tabloid
- Owner: NP News Print AG
- Editor: Philppe Pfister
- Founded: 5 December 2007
- Ceased publication: 4 December 2009; 16 years ago
- Political alignment: Neutral
- Language: German
- Country: Switzerland
- Circulation: 334,000
- OCLC number: 638028289
- Website: newsprint.ch (defunct pre-August 2012)

News was a Swiss German-language free daily newspaper, published by NP News Print AG between 2007 and 2009.

Published in tabloid format, it had regional editions for Zurich, Bern, and Basel as well the middle land of the Swiss Plateau.

== History and operations ==
The newspaper was launched on 5 December 2007. Like other Swiss commuter newspapers, it was available in boxes at main transfer points of the public transport system of trains, trams and buses. The newspaper competed with other German-language, free, Swiss newspapers, including .ch, 20 Minuten and heute. It is claimed that it had a circulation of 334,000.

The editions for Bern and Basel ceased publication on 28 August 2009, the Zurich edition on 4 December 2009.

=== Publisher ===
NP News Print AG, a joint effort of Tamedia (Tages-Anzeiger, Berner Zeitung) and Basler Zeitung Medien, also publishes the daily Basler Zeitung and the free daily Baslerstab.

== See also ==
- List of free daily newspapers
