= Tessiner Zeitung =

Swiss German-language regional newspaper

- Type: Weekly newspaper
- Founder: Pietro Giugno
- Founded: 1 September 1908; 117 years ago
- Language: German
- Headquarters: Locarno, Ticino, Switzerland
- Country: Switzerland
- Circulation: 10,002 (2003)
- ISSN: 1660-9697
- OCLC number: 173873821
- Website: tessinerzeitung.ch

Tessiner Zeitung is a Swiss German-language regional newspaper, published in Locarno, Ticino.

== Operations ==
Tessiner Zeitung was first published in Locarno on 1 September 1908 and was founded by Pietro Giugno. In May 1918 the paper was acquired by a group of journalists who published another newspaper Freie Zeitung.

The paper was published three times per week and had a circulation of 5,000 copies at the beginning of the 1990s. Then the paper began to be published weekly on Fridays. According to WEMF AG, the newspaper had a circulation of 10,002, as of 2003.
