= Gottlieb Friedrich Stähli =

- Born: April 20, 1801; Trachselwald, Bern, Switzerland
- Died: November 23, 1835 (aged 34); Bern, Switzerland
- Occupations: Politician, teacher, school reformer, journalist
- Parent(s): Gottlieb Vincenz Stähli (father); Maria Magdalena Hunziker (mother)

Gottlieb Friedrich Stähli (20 April 1801 – 23 November 1835) was a Swiss liberal politician, school reformer, and journalist from the Canton of Bern. He played a significant role in educational reform in Burgdorf and served in various municipal and cantonal positions during the early years of liberal governance in Bern following the fall of the patriciate in 1831.

== Early life and education ==
Gottlieb Friedrich Stähli was born on 20 April 1801 in Trachselwald, the third of nine children of pastor Gottlieb Vincenz Stähli, a bourgeois of Burgdorf, and Maria Magdalena née Hunziker. He grew up in Trachselwald and attended the mixed school of the bourgeoisie before proceeding to the Latin school in Burgdorf. From 1815, he attended the gymnasium in Bern.

Stähli studied theology at the Academy of Bern, which enabled him to secure a position as a tutor in Aubonne in 1818. He was among the founding members of the Swiss Student Society of Zofingue in 1819 and was ordained as a pastor in 1824.

== Career in education and municipal politics ==
From 1821 to 1834, Stähli served as a teacher at the Latin school in Burgdorf, where he played a decisive role in reforming the city's school system. His family connections and friendships with the influential Schnell family of Burgdorf allowed him to rise into the higher circles of society.

Stähli served as secretary of the commune of Burgdorf from 1826 to 1828 and zealously occupied several municipal positions. He was president of public assistance and the school commission (both until 1834), as well as a member of the Society of Public Utility. As a supporter of liberal ideas, he welcomed the fall of the patriciate in 1831.

He participated in informal meetings of liberal leaders gathered around the Schnell brothers (especially Karl and Johann Schnell) at the Zum Stadthaus inn in Burgdorf, which was run by his brother Gottlieb Rudolf Stähli. Stähli served as president of the newly created inhabitants' commune from 1832 to 1834 and presided over the bourgeoisie until his death.

== Journalism and cantonal politics ==
From 1831 to 1834, Stähli worked as an editor at the Berner Volksfreund, where he collaborated notably with his former fellow student Albert Bitzius, known under the pseudonym Jeremias Gotthelf. In January 1832, he was appointed to the grand commission responsible for drafting a law on primary schools in the Canton of Bern.

Stähli was elected to the Grand Council in November 1833 and to the Department of Public Instruction in December 1833. As second secretary of the Council in 1834, he moved to Bern and was responsible for, among other things, drafting the minutes of the Executive Council.

== Death ==
Violently attacked by supporters of the patriciate and by the radicals who, in the spring of 1835, had fallen out with the Schnell brothers over foreign policy questions, Stähli took his own life on 23 November 1835. The reasons for this action remain unclear.

== Bibliography ==
- Huber-Renfer, Fritz: "Gottlieb Friedrich Stähli von Burgdorf als Redaktor des 'Berner Volksfreund' 1831–1835", in: Burgdorfer Jahrbuch, 11, 1944, pp. 7–85.
- Huber-Renfer, Fritz: "Gottlieb Friedrich Stähli von Burgdorf als Lehrer 1821–1830", in: Burgdorfer Jahrbuch, 12, 1945, pp. 7–88.
- Huber-Renfer, Fritz: "Gottlieb Friedrich Stähli von Burgdorf als Politiker", in: Burgdorfer Jahrbuch, 14, 1947, pp. 7–60.
- Mahlmann-Bauer, Barbara; Derron, Marianne et al. (ed.): Politische Publizistik 1828–1854, vol. 2: Kommentar 1828–1840, 2012, pp. 14–34 (Historisch-kritische Gesamtausgabe /Jeremias Gotthelf, section F/1).
