= Le Matin (Switzerland) =

French-language daily newspaper in Switzerland

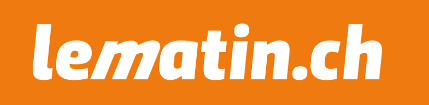
- Type: Daily newspaper
- Format: Tabloid
- Owner(s): Tamedia (TX Group)
- Founded: 1972; 54 years ago
- Language: French
- Headquarters: Lausanne
- Country: Switzerland
- Sister newspapers: Le Matin Bleu
- ISSN: 1018-3736 (print); 1664-9869 (web)
- OCLC number: 723746604
- Website: www.lematin.ch

Le Matin (French pronunciation: [lə matɛ̃], lit. 'The Morning'), Le Matin Dimanche on Sundays, is a Swiss French-language daily newspaper published by TX Group (formerly Tamedia) in Lausanne, Switzerland. The publication of the daily newspaper Le Matin was stopped on 21 July 2018. The Sunday and online versions continue.

== History and profile ==
La Tribune de Lausanne was created in 1893, merging with the daily paper L'Estafette in 1896. In 1912, the paper was bought by [[Imprimeries Réunies|Société de la Feuille d'Avis de Lausanne et des Imprimeries réunies]], and became a politically independent informational paper, for a generalist audience with lower prices. It received a Sunday edition starting in 1914, Tribune-Dimanche.

It was renamed as Tribune-Le Matin in 1972. With this rename the Sunday edition was changed to Le Matin Dimanche in 1972. It was completely renamed Le Matin in 1984. This rename was done in an effort to make the paper seem less local, as the paper had not differentiated itself enough from another Lausanne paper, 24 heures. Starting in 1986, it had two supplement magazines for its Sunday edition, Femina and Télé-Top-M.

The paper was a daily published in tabloid-format. Between 31 October 2005 and 25 September 2009, Edipresse also published Le Matin Bleu, a free daily newspaper distributed in the most-populated areas of Romandy. However, despite the similar names between the new newspapers, they were edited independently. Le Matin Bleu ceased publication because of the merger of Edipresse with Tamedia, publisher of the competing 20 Minutes. In 2024, Tamedia, now its owner, made plans to merge the editorial offices of the publication with other publications it owned, 24 heures and the Tribune de Genève.

In 1997 Le Matin had a circulation of 67,522 copies. The same year the circulation of Le Matin dimanche was 226,465 copies. The 2006 circulation of Le Matin was 76,194 copies. In 2007 it was 70,012, and Le Matin Dimanche had 210,177 copies. Its Sunday supplement Le Matin Dimanche had a circulation of 215,024 in 2006. In 2009 Le Matin's circulation was 58,849 copies.
