= Somedia =

Swiss publishing company

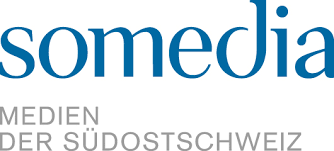
- Company type: Publishing house
- Industry: Publishing
- Genre: Newspaper publishing
- Founder: Hanspeter Lebrument
- Headquarters: Chur, Graubünden, Switzerland
- Number of locations: Glarus, Uznach, Rapperswil, Zürich
- Key people: Andrea Masüger (CEO)
- Products: Media
- Operating income: 128 Mio (2013)
- Number of employees: 1,000
- Website: www.somedia.ch

Somedia is a Swiss publishing company, headquartered in Chur, Graubünden. It is a media empire in Eastern Switzerland. Their most famous product is the newspaper Die Südostschweiz.

== Operations ==
It publishes the following magazines and newspapers:

- Aroser Zeitung – Arosa
- Bündner Tagblatt – Chur
- Bündner Woche – Chur
- Davoser Zeitung – Davos
- Die Südostschweiz – Chur, Glarus and Uznach
- Graubünden Exclusiv – Chur
- Höfner Volksblatt – Wollerau
- La Quotidiana (in Romansh language) – Chur
- Liechtensteiner Vaterland – Vaduz
- Liechtensteiner Volksblatt – Schaan
- Obersee-Nachrichten – Rapperswil
- Terra Grischuna – Chur
- Werdenberger & Obertoggenburger – Buchs

== See also ==
- List of companies of Switzerland
- List of newspapers in Switzerland
