= La Liberté (Switzerland) =

Swiss newspaper

- Type: Daily newspaper
- Founder: Joseph Schorderet
- Publisher: St-Paul Médias SA
- Founded: 1871
- Language: French
- Headquarters: Fribourg
- Country: Switzerland
- ISSN: 1660-2293 (print); 1662-6389 (web)
- OCLC number: 806828891
- Website: www.laliberte.ch

La Liberté (French pronunciation: [la libɛʁte], lit. 'The Liberty') is a Swiss French-language daily newspaper based in Fribourg founded in 1871 by Catholic priest Joseph Schorderet.

== History ==
La Liberté was founded 1871 in Fribourg by Catholic priest Joseph Schorderet. It was printed by the Œuvre de Saint-Paul, (St. Paul SA) an organization founded by the Sisters of Saint-Paul to promote apostolate press. Created in the time of the Kulturkampf (a struggle between government and church), its purpose was to defend conservative Catholic ideas, particularly from the left wing and liberal press. Its initial subtitle was Journal catholique quotidien.

Following World War II, it served to promote Francophone Catholic ideas. Until 1965, most of its editorial staff was religious. From the 1970s, its editor in chief François Gross promoted more liberal and critical ideas, resulting in its popularity spreading outside the canton. In 1995, its editor-in-chief became Roger de Diesbach; under his helm the newspaper moved further away from explicitly Catholic proslytizing. The newspaper underwent a redesign in 1999.

St-Paul closed its printing sector in 2014, following the loss its main outside client, the Freiburger Nachrichten. As a result printing of the paper moved out of Fribourg. It is one of the few Francophone Swiss papers to not be run by the major media companies. The company began collaborating in its publishing with ESH Médias, a publishing company for several other papers, in 2016. This contract was terminated in 2022 over editorial differences. In May 2026, St-Paul Médias SA merged its editorial teams with that of the newspapers La Gruyère and La Broye Hebdo, also owned by St-Paul Médias SA. This was done for economic reasons and to maintain the three titles.

== Profile ==
It is the only Francophone daily paper in Fribourg. The newspaper is published by St-Paul Médias SA. Other papers run by Saint-Paul SA include La Gruyère, La Broye Hebdo and Le Messager. Le Messager ceased publication in December 2025.

In 1999, its circulation was 36,000, and 38,600 in 2006.
