= LaRegione =

Swiss-Italian language daily newspaper

laRegione
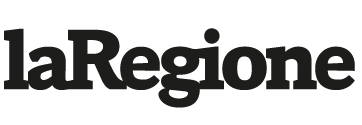
- Type: Daily newspaper
- Editor-in-chief: Giacomo Salvioni
- Founded: 1992; 34 years ago (from the merger of Il Dovere and L'Eco di Locarno)
- Language: Italian
- Headquarters: Bellinzona, Ticino
- Country: Switzerland
- Circulation: 19,150 (as of 2025)
- OCLC number: 173867595
- Website: www.laregione.ch (in Italian)

laRegione, formerly laRegioneTicino (English: The Ticino Region), is a Swiss Italian-language daily newspaper, based in Bellinzona, Ticino, with regional divisions in Locarno, Lugano and Chiasso. It was founded in 1992 from the merger of Il Dovere and L'Eco di Locarno. The newspaper's editor-in-chief is Giacomo Salvioni. It has a readership of 72,000.
