= Volkswacht am Bodensee =

Defunct Swiss newspaper

- Founder: Adolf Deucher
- Editor: Enrico Tung
- Founded: 1909
- Ceased publication: 1934
- Language: German
- City: Romanshorn
- Country: Switzerland

Volkswacht am Bodensee was a newspaper published from Romanshorn, Switzerland 1909–1934. Volkswacht was founded by Adolf Deucher. It functioned as a Free Democratic Party organ. The newspaper was edited by Enrico Tung. As of the late 1920s, it had a circulation of 1,600 copies.
