= Blick am Abend =

Daily free newspaper in Switzerland (2008–2018)

- 21 December 2018 issue
- Type: Free daily newspaper
- Format: Tabloid
- Owner: Ringier
- Founder: Ringier
- Editor-in-chief: Peter Röthlisberger
- Founded: 1 June 2008
- Ceased publication: 21 December 2018
- Language: German
- Headquarters: Zürich
- Country: Switzerland
- Sister newspapers: Blick

Blick am Abend was a free evening newspaper published in Switzerland and based in Zürich. It existed between 2008 and 2018.

== History and profile ==
Blick am Abend was first published on 1 June 2008 as a successor to the afternoon free daily Heute.

Blick am Abend, based in Zürich, was a free newspaper owned by Ringier. It was an evening newspaper published in tabloid format. Peter Röthlisberger was the editor-in-chief of the daily. Its sister newspaper was Blick, a leading daily in the country.

In 2008 Blick am Abend started a biweekly legal column which answers the reader questions. Until 2009 the daily had editions in Zürich, Bern and Basel. St. Gallen and Luzern/Zug editions were started in 2009. In December 2013 the paper launched its online edition.

The audited circulation of Blick am Abend in 2008 was 211,000 copies. The paper had a circulation of 225,226 copies in 2009. It was 329,418 copies in 2010, and its readership was 604,000 the same year.

Blick am Abend discontinued in December 2018.
