= Basellandschaftliche Zeitung =

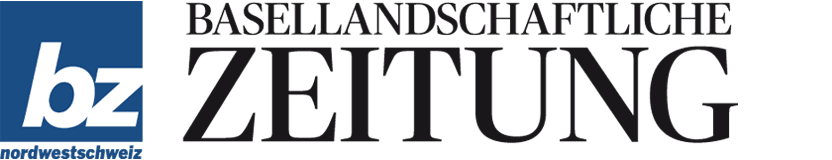
- Type: Daily newspaper
- Owner: Luedin
- Editor-in-chief: Franz C. Widmer
- Founded: 1854
- Language: German
- Headquarters: Liestal, Basel-Landschaft
- Country: Switzerland
- Circulation: 23,500 – daily 81,000 – Wednesday edition
- OCLC number: 29228272
- Website: www.bzbasel.ch

Basellandschaftliche Zeitung (transl. Basel-Landschaft Newspaper), (abbreviated as bz), is a Swiss Standard German language daily newspaper, published by Luedin. The company is based in Liestal, Basel-Landschaft, with two offices based in Liestal and Basel. Its editor-in-chief is Franz C. Widmer.

As of 2018, covering the Basel region, its daily circulation according to WEMF, stood at 21,632 or 24,306 widespread copies. Its Wednesday weekly circulation was reported to be 117,469. It is the second largest daily newspaper in the Basel region (behind the Basler Zeitung).

The Basellandschaftliche Zeitung was founded in 1854 as a mouthpiece for the political establishment.The company remained independent until 2006 when it was sold to AZ Median. In October 2018, it was taken over by the joint venture of CH Media, a partnership between the NZZ Media Group and AZ Medien. Previously, the newspaper was known under its founding name Basellandscahftliche Zeitung, however, since July 2019, it has been renamed as BZ Basel or Baseler Zeitung. Following the rebranding of the newspaper, the acronym 'bz' can still be found in the newspaper's word mark as a reminder of its original title though it no longer retains any independent meaning.

== History ==
=== Forerunner to bz ===
Der Unerschrockene Rauracher is considered the precursor of bz. The subtitle of the brand described itself as a ‘Swiss truth-loving paper for religion, sensible popular law and enlightenment’. This revolutionary paper was founded during the cantonal civil war in Basel, which had largely been fought using pamphlets and colloquially named the 'paper war'. In January 1831 the Baseler Zeitung was first issued on a triweekly basis, in an attempt to localise the revolutionary movement in the countryside with one-sided articles. In response to the one-sided publications, Benedikt Banga, a local clerk, bought a printing press to produce Der Unerschrockene Rauracher from 1 July 1832. Despite its 600 copies the newspaper did not increase its circulation, and the paper expired after only five years.

Before this time, the firm of Banga and Honegger had produced several newspapers. Up to six papers circulated in Basel simultaneously. Many of them were printed by Banga and Honegger and they frequently changed their titles before becoming discontinued. By 1853, only three newspapers remained in the Basel region: Landschäftler, Bundesfreund and Baselbieter. These papers would converge in opposition to the local government, due, in part, to the circumstances surrounding a railroad project; the Basel-Landschaft government was pushing it ahead in a manner perceived to be with little regard for landowners, including the seizure of land and destruction of farmland.

=== Founding, 1854 ===
Following a period in which the ruling party no longer held a majority in the cantonical parliament, prominent individuals decided to found the Basellandschaftliche Zeitung (bz) in order to become the primary source of news in the county. The intention to found the newspaper was communicated to the printers, Lüdin & Walser, publishers of the Bundesfreund, who were asked to surrender their publication. Despite initial reluctance, Lüdin & Walser would concede with bitter words. On 1 July 1854, the bz was published for the first time by Lüdin & Walser printing works, replacing the other newspapers in the canton. Despite criticism and resistance from rival papers, the bz emerged as a permanently established newspaper.

In the National Council elections of 1854, the Baselbieter newspapers were party publications. Each paper presented two candidates for election to the Federal Assembly, whom they promoted during the electoral campaign. The bz specifically supported the candidacy of Stephan Gutzwiller and provided multiple affirmations of his role in the Assembly. It was assumed that Gutzwiller had penned the statements himself, however, such article credits were not attributed to him, as this was not conventional at that time.
