= La Quotidiana =

Swiss newspaper

- Type: Daily newspaper
- Owner: Somedia
- Founded: 1997
- Language: Romansh
- Headquarters: Chur, Switzerland
- ISSN: 1424-7496
- OCLC number: 805661427
- Website: www.laquotidiana.ch

La Quotidiana is a Swiss Romansh-language daily newspaper. It is published by Somedia and was founded in 1997 with support from the Romansh news agency Agentura da Novitads Rumantscha. The newspaper was temporarily based in Ilanz, afterwards in Chur. It was the first daily Romansh newspaper, and was founded out of a combination of most of the Romansh papers then in existence.

== History ==
The paper was founded in 1997 with support from the Romansh news agency Agentura da Novitads Rumantscha. Its founder and publisher was Hanspeter Lebrumen, of the Südostschweiz Mediengruppe (later Somedia). It was founded as the combination of all other Romansh papers then in existence, with the exception of the Surmiran Pagina da Surmeir and the Engadiner Post/Posta ladina (the latter was a German paper that also had a Romansh section). It was the first daily Romansh newspaper, and as of 2017 was still the only daily Romansh paper.

Romansh is the fourth official language of Switzerland and the least spoken of them. The language has several different established forms; La Quotidiana is written in both the traditional varieties and the standardized artificial variety Rumantsch Grischun. Usage of the standardized variety has been subject to political controversy among speakers of the language. Often more than half of the articles of La Quotidiana are written in Sursilvan, the variety with the largest number of speakers.

At its launch it had a circulation of 8,000. In 2006 it had about 5,500 subscribers. The next year, Lebrumen considered that the paper, facing financial issues, be converted into a weekly rather than daily paper if financials did not improve. This did not occur after they developed a closer relationship between the paper and the Romansh news agency Agentura da Novitads Rumantscha, which lowered their number of editors and therefore costs. Three years later, he again threatened to close the paper and another he owned if the Swiss Federal Office of Communications did not grand him a concession. They obliged, and the paper again avoided closure.

In 2017, the paper was once again facing closure or a change from daily to weekly due to financial problems, with the publisher no longer wanting to support the paper at a loss. At the time it had a steadily decreasing subscriber base of about 4,000, down from 5,000. Efforts were made to save it, and Somedia leadership looked for more funding. Later that year, federal and cantonal funding, as well as funding from the publisher Somedia were secured, though additional funding was looked for. The president of the Romansh group announced the next year the paper's existence was secured until 2018's end, though did not rule out further changes.

== Operations ==
It is published by the Südostschweiz Mediengruppe, later Somedia. The newspaper is a member of MIDAS (European Association of Daily Newspapers in Minority and Regional Languages). The newspaper was temporarily based in Ilanz, afterwards in Chur. Issues are printed in Haag SG, St. Gallen.

== See also ==
- Histoire linguistique de la Romania, p. 752, at Google Books (Book about history of the Romansh language)
