= La Broye Hebdo =

Swiss weekly newspaper

- Type: Weekly newspaper
- Founders: Jean-Daniel Fattebert; Vincent Bandaret
- Publisher: St-Paul Médias SA
- Founded: 22 December 1999
- Language: French
- City: Payerne
- Country: Switzerland
- ISSN: 1660-4199
- OCLC number: 717911469
- Website: www.labroye.ch

La Broye Hebdo (lit. 'The Broye Weekly', also simply La Broye) is a Swiss French-language weekly regional newspaper published for the Broye region. It was established in 1999 as a magazine insert for several Broye newspapers, but soon became a biweekly newspaper, and later a weekly newspaper. It is published in Payerne by St-Paul Médias SA.

== History ==
La Broye Hebdo's first issue was released 22 December 1999, co-founded by Jean-Daniel Fattebert and Vincent Bandaret. Established on the initiative of three newspapers in Broye, including Le Démocrate de Payerne, it was initially a magazine insert bundled in those three newspapers. It soon became a biweekly newspaper. In 2002, the Journal de Payerne was merged into it. In 2005, it became a weekly paper, published on Thursdays. Jean-Daniel Fattebert was previously editor-in-chief.

It was acquired by the Swiss media company Edipresse. When Edipresse was bought out by and merged with Tamedia, they retained ownership of the paper. In 2010, the Feuille d'Avis d'Avenches was merged into it. In September 2014, Tamedia sought to sell La Broye Hebdo alongside two of its other papers, all local French-language papers, inherited from the merge: Le Régional and the Journal de Morges. La Broye Hebdo was the first to find a buyer; in 2015, it was bought from Tamedia by the Fribourg-based Groupe Saint-Paul, the publisher of La Liberté and two other papers.

As of 2020, Danièle Pittet was its director and editor-in-chief. To celebrate the paper's 20th anniversary in 2020, the paper released a book, Entre plume et crayon, by Michel Berger (aka Mibé) and Fattebert. The next year, in 2021, the newspaper Journal de Moudon was merged into La Broye Hebdo. In June 2025, St-Paul Médias SA established a joint editorial team between the paper and the Payerne edition of La Liberté. La Broye Hebdo's editor-in-chief, Isabelle Kottelat, was replaced by Delphine Francey, who had headed the Payerne edition of La Liberté. In May 2026, St-Paul Médias SA announced it would merge its editorial teams with that of the newspapers La Liberté and La Gruyère, the two other papers also owned by St-Paul Médias SA (its third newspaper, Le Messager, had ceased publication in late 2025). With it, they also announced job cuts. This was done for economic reasons and to maintain the three titles.

== Contents and profile ==
A weekly newspaper, La Broye Hebdocovers the Broye region of Switzerland in the cantons of Vaud and Fribourg; it also covers the Vully region in Vaud. It is published out of Payerne in the Broye region by St-Paul Médias SA. The Swiss newspaper 24 heures described it as the leading publication of the Broye region; its foundation aimed to establish a regional identity, with the region previously having 10 different publications. Initially noted for its green color scheme, this later shifted to blue.

Its circulation was largely stable from the late 2000s to 2020. It had a circulation of 7,820 in 2009, over 9,000 in 2014, 8,660 in 2020, and about 9,000 in 2025. It has a once a month mass-distributed edition, which as of 2024 had a circulation of about 25,500 copies.
