= La Côte (newspaper) =

Swiss daily newspaper

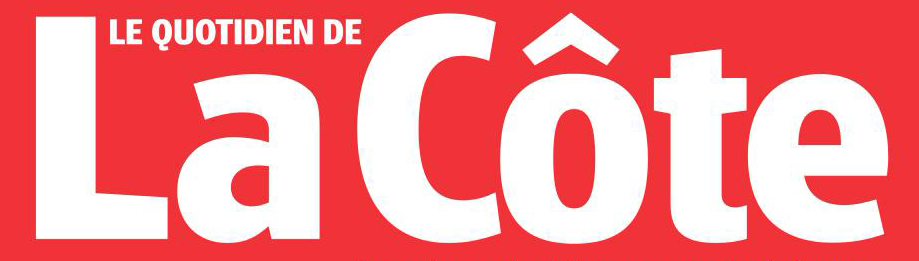
- Founder: Jean-Pierre Manz
- Publisher: ESH Médias
- Founded: 1987
- Language: French
- Headquarters: Nyon, Canton of Vaud
- Country: Switzerland
- ISSN: 2234-9758
- OCLC number: 1404682581
- Website: www.lacote.ch

La Côte (French pronunciation: [la kot]; formerly the Quotidien de La Côte) is a Swiss French-language regional daily newspaper that publishes out of Nyon in the Canton of Vaud. It was founded in 1987 by Jean-Pierre Manz. It is published by ESH Médias.

== History ==
It publishes out of Nyon in the Canton of Vaud. It was founded in 1987 as the Quotidien de La Côte by printer Jean-Pierre Manz. The paper was created out of the merger of several small biweekly and triweekly papers in the Geneva Lake region. It was initially published by Cherix et Filianosa SA. In 1993 it had a circulation of about 14,000, and a merger with the larger paper the L'Est Vaudois was suggested. Its first editor-in-chief was Pierre Thomas, who left the next year.

In 1996, it was renamed just La Côte and received a redesign. These changes were done to compete with newly established publications in the region, including free papers. That year, it had a print run of 13,000, mostly making money off of subscriptions as less than 15% of sales were from unit. It then had an increase in advertising revenue despite a national decrease.

In 2001 it was bought out by the French businessman Philippe Hersant, who proceeded to buy several other regional papers. As of 2022 it is published by ESH Médias.

== Content ==
It adopted digital first production in 2018, with the production of the print edition following the finalization of the digital one. In its journalism stories are assigned to specific pages, which imposes stricter story length limits, in contrast with other Swiss papers.
