= Falce e Martello =

Italian communist newspaper

- Type: Weekly newspaper
- Founder: Walter Barrizi
- Editor: E. Arnold; J. Rausch; F. Wieser
- Founded: July 1925 (in Lugano, Switzerland)
- Ceased publication: October 1936 (in Zurich, Switzerland)
- Political alignment: Communist
- Language: Italian
- Headquarters: Various locations during its history: Lugano (founded); Basel; Zurich (last)
- Country: Switzerland

Falce e Martello (transl. Hammer and Sickle) was an Italian-language communist weekly newspaper published as the organ of the Communist Party of Switzerland in Ticino.

== History ==
It was founded in 1925 by a Ticinian worker, Walter Barrizi.

The newspaper was published in Lugano from July 1925, then moved publication to Basel in 1928 and to Zurich in October 1934. After moving to Zurich, publication would return to Lugano, and then return to Zurich again.

Officially, it was produced by a group of German-speaking Swiss communists as its editors, E. Arnold and J. Rausch and F. Wieser. In reality, however, the newspaper was managed by Italian-speaking communists.

The newspaper ceased publication in October 1936, because of financial constraints. It would be replaced by the newspaper Il Popolo.
