= Journal de Sierre =

Swiss newspaper

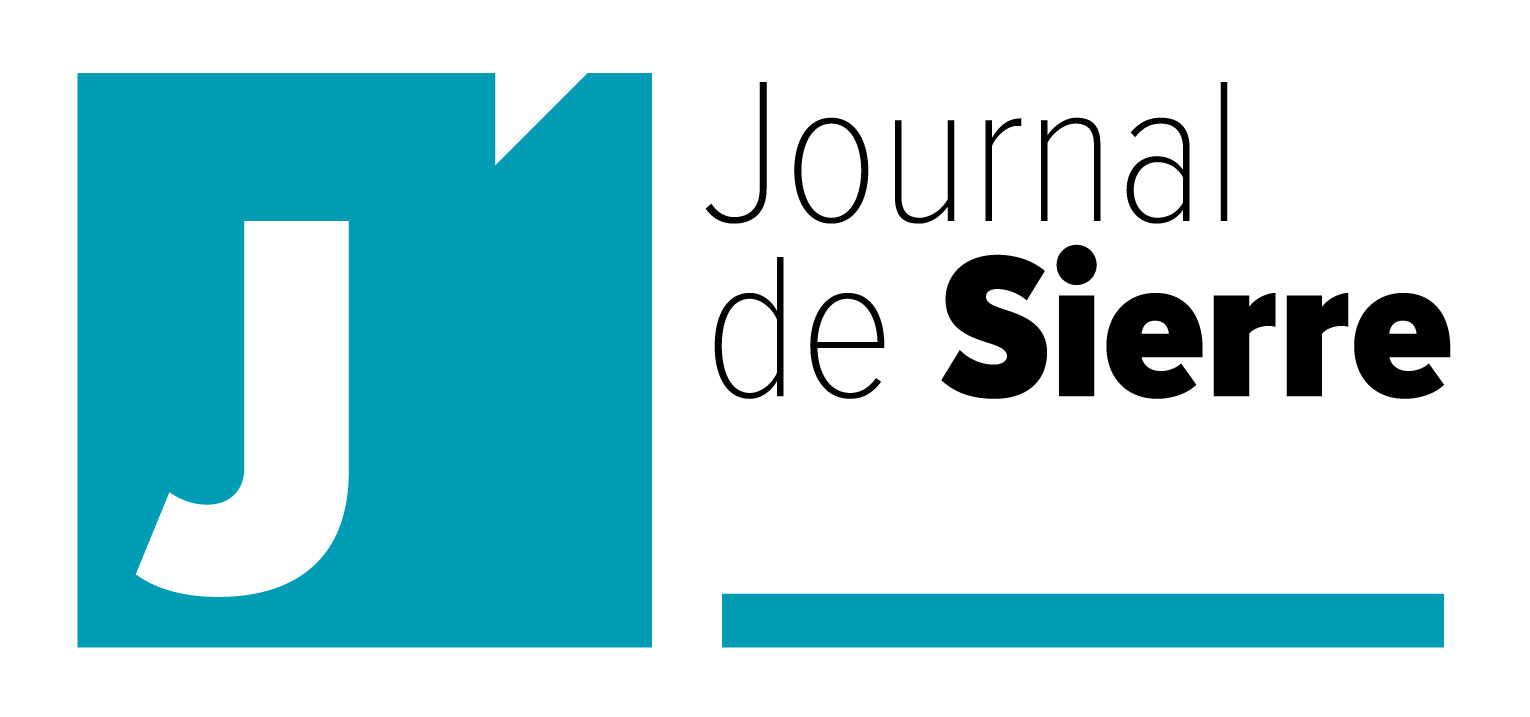
- Type: Bimonthly newspaper
- Owner: ESH Médias
- Founder: Ernest Schoechli
- Editor-in-chief: Joël Cerruti
- Founded: 23 January 1914
- Language: French
- City: Sierre
- Country: Switzerland
- Circulation: 22,000 (as of 2022)
- Price: Free
- OCLC number: 173958242
- Website: www.lejds.ch

The Journal de Sierre et du Valais central, formerly the Feuille commerciale de Sierre et du district, is a Swiss French-language bimonthly regional newspaper published in Sierre in the Valais canton. It was established in 1914 by Ernest Schoechli; the paper continued under family ownership until it was bought by Rhône Média in 2002. It is currently owned by ESH Médias.

== History ==
The newspaper was created on 23 January 1914. The paper was established by Ernest Schoechli. It was started as a four page weekly newspaper, published on Fridays, under the name Feuille commerciale de Sierre et du district. It was renamed the Journal de Sierre on 3 January 1931. The Journal de Sierre continued under Schoechli family ownership, with control of the newspaper transferring to his son, Benoît Schoechli.

In April 2002 it switched to a tabloid format. In December of that year, facing an increasingly competitive advertising market and potential problems continuing to run the paper as a family enterprise, the paper was sold by Benoît Schoechli to Rhône Média, then publisher of Le Nouvelliste as well as several other papers published in Valais, for an undisclosed amount. Previously, the Journal de Sierre had been the only major paper published in Valais not controlled by Rhône Média. The editorial staff remained the same. In the 2010s, the newspaper shifted from a subscription based biweekly model to a bimonthly free one. In 2013 and again in 2022, it redesigned its layout and style.

== Profile ==
It covers the news of the Sierre region and the Valais canton. It is a bimonthly newspaper. It was previously a biweekly. It is a free newspaper, and is distributed to all households in Sierre. Previously, it was a subscription-based paper. In 1969 it had a circulation of 5,000 copies. In 1987, it had a circulation of 5,500 copies, and in 2002, once again, its circulation was about 5,000 copies. In 2022, it had a circulation of 22,000 as a free paper.

As of 2002, its editor-in-chief was Pascal Fauchèr. Christian Dayer became editor-in-chief of the paper in 2014. Upon his retirement, Dayer was succeeded by Isabelle Bagnoud Loretan in 2017. As of 2026, its editor-in-chief is Joël Cerruti, while its general manager is Sébastien Rey.
