= Berner Volksfreund =

Bernese liberal newspaper published 1831–1845

- Type: Weekly newspaper
- Owner(s): Karl and Johann Schnell
- Founder(s): Karl and Johann Schnell
- Publisher: Carl Langlois (1831–1845)
- Editor: Johann Ludwig Schnell, Eduard Blösch, Gottlieb Friedrich Stähli, Johann Jakob Reithard, Karl Schnell
- Founded: February 24, 1831
- Ceased publication: December 29, 1845
- Political alignment: Liberalism
- Language: German
- Headquarters: Burgdorf, Bern
- Country: Switzerland
- Circulation: Less than 1,000 (peaked at 600 in 1842)

The Berner Volksfreund (transl. Bernese People's Friend) was a German-language newspaper published in the Canton of Bern from 1831 to 1845. Founded during the Regeneration period in Switzerland, it served as the organ of liberal political forces grouped around the Schnell brothers and was published twice weekly on Sundays and Thursdays.

== History ==
=== Foundation and early years ===
The Berner Volksfreund was founded on 24 February 1831 by brothers Karl and Johann Schnell during the Regeneration period in Swiss politics. To circumvent censorship before the adoption of the Regeneration Constitution in Bern, the newspaper was initially printed by Ludwig Vogelsang in Solothurn. From 27 October 1831 until 29 December 1845, the journal was printed by Carl Langlois in Burgdorf, where the Schnell brothers had helped establish a printing press. Langlois was a former collaborator of the Sauerländer publishing house who had been recruited by the Schnell brothers.

=== Editorial leadership ===
More than a journal of editors, the Berner Volksfreund was a platform, a place for discussion of Bernese liberalism. The position of editor-in-chief changed hands several times throughout the publication's existence. Johann Ludwig Schnell, brother of Karl and Johann, initially led the publication, followed by a brief tenure under Eduard Blösch. Gottlieb Friedrich Stähli, a professor at the gymnasium in Burgdorf, then assumed leadership. In 1834, after Stähli relocated to Bern, Johann Jakob Reithard took over the position. When Reithard moved to Glarus in 1840, Karl Schnell himself assumed editorial control. Following Karl's death, publisher Carl Langlois took over editorial responsibilities.

Notable contributors to the newspaper included Albert Bitzius (better known as Jeremias Gotthelf), Ignaz Paul Vital Troxler, and Johann Peter Romang. The publication likely never exceeded 1,000 subscribers, with approximately 600 subscribers recorded in 1842. Only the editors-in-chief received payment for their work, with Reithard earning 500 francs annually. Reithard's ambition to transform the journal into a supra-regional publication ultimately failed.

=== Political position and content ===
Initially, the Berner Volksfreund positioned itself in opposition to the Allgemeine Schweizer-Zeitung, which held aristocratic tendencies, and against representatives of the Juste-Milieu. During its early years, the newspaper was perceived as an organ of the government. Beyond general political themes, the publication focused particularly on issues related to education, public utility, and popular instruction.

The newspaper's political stance shifted following the Bernese Grand Council's refusal to expel Napoleon III, a decision that prompted the Schnell brothers to resign their political mandates. Subsequently, the Berner Volksfreund took positions against radicalism and the Bernese government led by Charles Neuhaus, increasingly isolating itself from mainstream liberal opinion.

== Successor publication ==
On 2 January 1846, the Berner Volksfreund was replaced by the Berner Volkszeitung. However, this successor publication also failed to unite liberal and liberal-conservative circles. Instead, it adopted reactionary positions that led to Langlois's resignation as publisher. Between 1 January and 31 December 1847, the newspaper was published by the Haller printing house in Bern.

== Bibliography ==
- Rothen, Fritz: Die bernische Presse und die Staatsumwälzung von 1830/31, 1925.
- Widmann, Max: Festschrift der Firma Langlois & Cie., Buchhandlung und Verlag, Burgdorf, 1831–1931, 1931.
- Münch, Paul: Studien zur bernischen Presse 1830–1840, 1945.
- Schaffroth, Paul: Sturm und Drang. Aus der Vergangenheit der stadtbernischen Presse (1500–1900), 1991.
- Wernicke, Norbert D.; Mahlmann-Bauer, Barbara: "Zur Einführung: Albert Bitzius und die politische Publizistik", in: Mahlmann-Bauer, Barbara; Derron, Marianne et al. (ed.): Politische Publizistik 1828–1854, vol. 2: Kommentar 1828–1840, 2012, pp. 13–47 (Historisch-kritische Gesamtausgabe / Jeremias Gotthelf, section F/1).
