= Le Nouvelliste (Switzerland) =

Swiss newspaper

- Type: Daily newspaper
- Owner: ESH Médias
- Founder: Charles Haegler
- Publisher: Éditions Le Nouvelliste SA
- Editor-in-chief: Vincent Fragnière
- Founded: 1903
- Language: French
- Headquarters: Sion, Valais
- Country: Switzerland
- ISSN: 1661-500X
- OCLC number: 805684321
- Website: www.lenouvelliste.ch

Le Nouvelliste (French pronunciation: [lə nuvɛlist]) is a Swiss French-language daily newspaper, published in Sion, Valais, by the publishing company Éditions Le Nouvelliste SA. It is owned by ESH Médias. A regional newspaper for the Valais canton, it was established in 1903 in Saint-Maurice by Charles Haegler. At first, it was published three times a week, then became a daily newspaper in 1929.

== History ==
The paper was founded by Charles Haegler, the paper's editor-in-chief in 1903 in Saint-Maurice as the Nouvelliste Valaisan, aiming to cover all of the Valais Canton. Its first issue was printed 17 November 1903. The paper was conservative and Catholic in orientation. The paper was published three times a week until 1928, after which it became a daily, the first Valais paper to do so.

Haegler was succeeded by André Luisier ad editor-in-chief in 1949, who merged the paper with another paper from Saint-Maurice, Le Rhône, together forming the Nouvelliste du Rhône, which after 1960 was printed in Sion. This paper then merged with the Feuille d'Avis du Valais in 1968, to form the Le Nouvelliste: feuille d'avis du Valais, renamed in 2005 Le Nouvelliste. Starting in 1971, it was the first Swiss daily paper to print using four-color offset printing.

It is printed by Rhône-Média Group. It is the main paper in the Valais canton, alongside the German language Walliser Bote. In 2008, it had a print run of 42,614. It is owned by ESH Médias.
