= Radio Pilatus =

Radio station in Lucerne, Switzerland

- Lucerne; Switzerland
- Broadcast area: Central Switzerland

Links
- Webcast: https://chmedia.streamabc.net/79-pilatus-mp3-192-4664468
- Website: https://www.radiopilatus.ch/

Radio Pilatus is a private radio station in Central Switzerland. The station started transmission in 1983. The studios are in Lucerne.

Radio Pilatus also covers traffic for most of the Central Switzerland regions to let listeners know of traffic congestion or accidents.
