= La Gruyère (newspaper) =

Swiss newspaper

- Type: Thrice weekly newspaper
- Owner: St-Paul Médias SA
- Founder(s): Simon Castella, Léon Glasson
- Founded: 1882
- Language: French
- Headquarters: Bulle, Canton of Fribourg
- Country: Switzerland
- ISSN: 2296-2409 (print); 2296-2417 (web)
- Website: www.lagruyere.ch

La Gruyère (French pronunciation: [la ɡʁɥijɛʁ]) is a Swiss French-language thrice weekly newspaper that publishes out of Bulle in the Canton of Fribourg. It was founded by Simon Castella and Léon Glasson as an organ for the political opposition, and afterwards completely owned by the Glasson family. In 1976, the family sold most of their shares to St. Paul SA, the publisher of rival newspaper La Liberté.

== History ==
La Gruyère was founded in 1882 by, among others, Simon Castella and Léon Glasson. Its first issue was printed 7 October 1882. It was founded in the Kulturkampf (a conflict between the church and state) period, and originally was founded as a party organ of the radical democratic political opposition. The paper was created in reaction to another paper, Le Fribourgeois, which expressed the ideas of the in-power Conservative Party. After 1903, the Glasson family was the sole owner of the paper.

It was initially a weekly, published on Saturdays. It then became a biweekly in December 1888. After 1928, it published three times a week, and prints out of the south of the Fribourg, appearing on Tuesdays, Thursdays and Saturdays. The Glasson's publishing company bought the Feuille d'Avis de Bulle et de Châtel-Saint-Denis paper in 1969, and merged it with La Gruyère in 1969, resulting in the circulation of the paper sharply increasing. It was previously published by Glasson Imprimeurs Editeurs SA out of Bulle. In 1976, the Glasson family sold most of their shares in the newspaper to the publisher of its rival paper La Liberté, the St. Paul printing company. Editor-in-chief and publisher Gérard Glasson, who a columnist for the paper, resigned in 1978. The paper was redesigned in 1997, then again in 2002 and 2009.

In 2006, the paper had a circulation of 14,812, and in 2009 it had a circulation of about 14,500 with 34,000 readers. Subscriptions then made up of 45% of the paper's income, with the rest coming from advertising. In 2009 its team was made up of 15 people. This was in a time of economic crisis for the Swiss press, but La Gruyère was somewhat less affected due to its lesser reliance on national advertising for funds. In 2012, the paper's editor-in-chief was Jérôme Gachet. For the paper's 130th anniversary that year, an issue was distributed that was designed to be as close to the paper's 1882 layout as possible, and in addition a replica of the first 1882 issue for comparison. In May 2026, its current owner, St-Paul Médias SA merged its editorial teams with that of the newspapers La Liberté and La Broye Hebdo, also owned by St-Paul Médias SA. This was done for economic reasons and to maintain the three titles.
