= Play (hacker group) =

Hacker group

Play (also Play Ransomware or PlayCrypt) is a hacker group responsible for ransomware extortion attacks on companies and governmental institutions. The group emerged in 2022 and attacked targets in the United States, Brazil, Argentina, Germany, Belgium and Switzerland. According to a joint advisory first issued by the FBI and CISA in December 2023 and updated in June 2025, the FBI knew of about 900 affected entities as of May 2025.

Security experts suspect that the group has links to Russia, since the encryption techniques used are similar to those used by other Russian-linked ransomware groups such as Hive and Nokoyawa.

The name "play" comes from the ".play" file extension that the group uses to encrypt their victims' data, leaving a message containing the word "PLAY" and an email address.

== History ==
In 2022, Play carried out a major attack on the Argentine judiciary of Córdoba.

In January 2023, the cloud computing company Rackspace confirmed that Play was responsible for a ransomware attack the previous month that disabled its hosted Microsoft Exchange environments.

In February 2023, a ransomware attack disrupted the IT systems of the city of Oakland, California, which declared a local state of emergency. Play claimed responsibility in March 2023 and threatened to publish documents it said it had stolen from the city.

In 2023, Play carried out a wave of attacks on Switzerland. At the end of March, the newspaper Neue Zürcher Zeitung was attacked, leading to the penetration of the systems of its service provider, CH-Media. This enabled Play to extract the addresses of over 400,000 Swiss citizens living abroad who had subscribed to the official newspaper for Swiss expatriates, Schweizer Revue. In the same month, a Valais community fell victim. In May/June, there was a massive hacker attack on an IT service provider of the Federal administration of Switzerland and confidential data, including financial data and tax information, was stolen for extortion. Various state-owned companies were affected.

== News ==
In April 2025, Play ransomware exploited Windows logging flaw in zero-day attacks. The Play ransomware gang has exploited a high-severity Windows Common Log File System flaw in zero-day attacks to gain SYSTEM privileges and deploy malware on compromised systems.

The vulnerability, tracked as CVE-2025-29824, was tagged by Microsoft as exploited in a limited number of attacks and patched during an April 2025 Patch Tuesday patch.
