= Le Quotidien Jurassien =

French newspaper in Switzerland

- Type: Daily newspaper
- Publisher: Editions D+P SA
- Founded: 1993
- Language: French
- Headquarters: Delémont, Jura canton
- Country: Switzerland
- ISSN: 1423-1778
- OCLC number: 715213483
- Website: www.lqj.ch

Le Quotidien Jurassien (French pronunciation: [lə kɔtidjɛ̃ ʒyʁasjɛ̃]) is a Swiss French language regional daily newspaper published in Delémont, in the Canton of Jura, Switzerland. It is the main newspaper of the Canton of Jura and the neighboring Bernese Jura.

== History and profile ==
Le Quotidien Jurassien was founded in 1993 following the merger of the newspapers Le Pays and Le Démocrate. Those papers had been politically opposed rivals for a long period, with Le Démocrate being left wing radical and Le Pays being conservative and religious. The paper is based in Delémont and published by Editions D+P SA. As of 2012 the paper was described as a leftist publication.

It is the main newspaper of the Canton of Jura and the neighboring Bernese Jura. In 1997 Le Quotidien Jurassien had a circulation of 24,821 copies. In the first half of 2008 the paper had a readership of 48,000 and it was 44,000 in the second half. In 2009 it had a circulation of about 22,000 copies. As of 2010 it employed about 100 people including those at the printing company.
