= ArcInfo (newspaper) =

Swiss newspaper

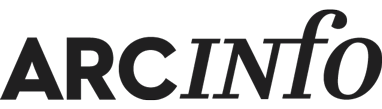

- 23 January 2018 issue
- Type: Daily newspaper
- Owner: ESH Médias
- Publisher: Société neuchâteloise de presse
- Editor-in-chief: Eric Lecluyse
- Managing editor: Jacques Matthey
- Founded: 23 January 2018; 8 years ago
- Language: French
- Headquarters: Neuchâtel, Canton of Neuchâtel
- Country: Switzerland
- ISSN: 2571-7480
- OCLC number: 1057443866
- Website: www.arcinfo.ch

ArcInfo is a Swiss French-language daily newspaper covering the Canton of Neuchâtel. It was formed out of a merger between the papers L'Express and L'Impartial in 2018. Both papers had previously mostly merged in the 1990s, sharing most of their content and their editorial boards, but a complete merger of their distribution was announced in 2017. It is published by the Société neuchâteloise de presse, owned by ESH Médias. Its editor-in-chief is Eric Lecluyse.

== Formation ==
The paper was formed out of a merger, between L'Express and L'Impartial, both papers centered in Neuchâtel. This was announced in August 2017 in an op-ed printed in both papers by the co-editor-in-chief Stéphane Devaux, who said things would change at the papers and that they were "in the middle of a vast project", opening up the possibility of merging their distribution. At the time, the company was undergoing economic problems, as were many other Swiss press companies. The papers had previously mostly merged in 1996, but had kept their names; the respective companies merged three years later. Afterwards, the two papers shared much of the same content and an editorial team, but differed in some of their regional coverage.

It was initially expressed by the media that this may entail job cuts, but the publisher later stated no jobs we would be lost at either paper in the process of the merger. The name ArcInfo was the name already used for the online versions of both publications. The local editorial staff were to be centered in La Chaux-de-Fonds, where L'Impartial was centered. The first issue of the paper was to be printed 23 January 2018, featuring a new layout that was identical even in the regional content.

In February 2024, there were job cuts and several people were laid off by ESH Médias; the editorial board of ArcInfo and several other papers with shared ownership criticized this. This was part of a larger issue for the French speaking media in Switzerland, with decreasing advertising revenues. Later in the year, the parliament of the Canton of Neuchâtel approved a motion calling for support for the paper, with 58 yes votes 32 no votes and 6 abstentions. The right wing opposed directly helping the paper (e.g. by taking over its subscription to Keystone-ATS agency).

It is published by the Société neuchâteloise de presse (SNP), which is owned by ESH Médias. This publication had been created by the merger of the two prior publishing companies. Its editor-in-chief is Eric Lecluyse, and its managing director is Jacques Matthey.
