= Blick =

Swiss German-language daily newspaper

- Type: Daily newspaper
- Format: Tabloid
- Owner: Ringier
- Founded: 1959; 67 years ago
- Language: German
- Headquarters: Zurich
- Country: Switzerland
- Circulation: 214,880 (2010)
- Sister newspapers: Blick am Abend
- ISSN: 1013-0667
- OCLC number: 805695696
- Website: www.blick.ch

Blick (lit. 'View') is a Swiss German-language daily newspaper and online news website covering current affairs, entertainment, sports and lifestyle. Based in Zurich, it is the largest newspaper in Switzerland with a print circulation of around 285,000. The newspaper has been printed continuously since its inception in 1959.

== History and profile ==
Blick was established in 1959. The newspaper was the first Swiss tabloid publication.

The format of Blick was broadsheet until 2005 when it was switched to tabloid. The new format induced controversies: protests began and many boycotted the scandalous newspaper. It was nevertheless a huge financial success. However, in 2009 the daily changed its format to broadsheet. Its sister paper was from 2008–2018 Blick am Abend, an evening free daily. Both papers are owned by Ringier and are based in Zürich.

Ladina Heimgartner was appointed CEO in October 2020. In August 2023, Christian Dorer stepped down as Editor-in-Chief after a 6 month time-out, replaced by co-chiefs Steffi Buchli, responsible for content, and Sandro Inguscio, responsible for the Digital & Distribution division.

== Controversy ==
The day after the 1971 Swiss women's suffrage referendum, Blick sported the headline 'Thanks for the Roses' on the front page accompanied by a naked blonde receiving roses from a man.

In November 1997, the magazine manipulated a photograph of water flowing outside the temple of Hatshepsut in Egypt following the massacre of 62 people at the site. Blick later apologised for the manipulation.

== Circulation ==
In the period of 1995–1996 Blick had a circulation of 335,143 copies, making it the best-selling paper in the country. In 1997 Blick had a circulation of 315,548 copies. In 2001 Blick had a daily circulation of 309,000 copies and a readership of 739,000. Its circulation was 292,292 copies in 2003, making it the best selling newspaper in Switzerland. The 2006 circulation of the paper was 254,657 copies. The Sunday edition Sonntagsblick had a circulation of 272,425 copies in 2006. Blick was the best-selling newspaper in 2008 with a circulation of 240,000 copies. Its circulation was 214,555 copies in 2009. The paper had a circulation of 214,880 copies in 2010, making it the third most read paper in the country.

According to WEMF Total Audience 2020-2, the Blick Group has a nationwide brand reach of 1,438 million via print and digital. Blick is now the Swiss media brand with the highest digital share, the exclusive, digital users already contribute 69% of the total reach. According to MACH Basic 2020-2, BLICK Print has 403,000 readers throughout Switzerland and has a distributed circulation (WEMF) of 95,944, placing it as the most read paid newspaper in Switzerland.

== Online ==
Blick publishes all news online, with free access both to current news and an archive of over 600,000 stories. In 2020, Blick reached 1.2 million users per day for the first time – 42 percent more than in the previous year. As of August 2023, Blick is the most visited news website in Switzerland. Blick launched both iOS and Android mobile applications for its content in 2010.

On 17 February 2020, the Blick Group launched Blick TV, the first digital channel in Switzerland. Blick TV is produced in the middle of the Blick Group's newsroom and covers the range of Blick topics daily from 6am to 11pm. Background reports from politics, business, people, entertainment, lifestyle, mobile and sports as well as weekly formats complement the program.

The Blick Group's podcast offering includes the podcast "Durchblick", which is produced in cooperation with the Gebert Rüf Foundation and which started its second season on 22 September 2020. Other formats such as "Pro und Konter" and "Fux über Sex" complete the selection.

== Awards ==
Blick journalists have won a range of awards including:

- Thomas Schlittler, SonntagsBlick, 2020
- Fabian Eberhard, SonntagsBlick, 2019
- Viktor Dammann, Blick, 2010
- Gabrielle Kleinert, Blick, 2007
- Christoph Scheuring, SonntagsBlick, 2006
- Beat Kraushaar & Martin Meier, SonntagsBlick, 2000
- Toto Marti, 3rd Place Swiss Press Photographer (Sport), 2018

== Editors ==
- Co-editor-in-chief Blick Group digital & distribution: Sandro Inguscio (2023 - )
- Co-editor-in-chief Blick Group content: Steffi Buchli (2023 - )
- Editor-in-chief Blick: Andreas Dietrich (2017 -)
- Editor-in-chief Sport: Felix Bingesser (2011–2020).
- Editor-in-chief SonntagsBlick: Gieri Cavelty (2017 -)
- Editor-in-chief Blick TV: Jonas Projer (2019 -)
- Editor-in-chief Blick Romandie: Michel Jeanneret (2020 -)

== See also ==
- Josef Ritler
