= Die Südostschweiz =

Swiss daily newspaper

Südostschweiz
- Type: Daily newspaper
- Owner: Somedia
- Founded: 1997
- Political alignment: Liberal
- Language: German
- Headquarters: Chur, Graubünden
- Country: Switzerland
- Circulation: 124,760 (2010)
- ISSN: 1424-7518
- OCLC number: 806845559
- Website: www.suedostschweiz.ch

Die Südostschweiz (transl. Southeastern Switzerland) is a Swiss German-language daily newspaper, published by Somedia (formerly Südostschweiz Mediengruppe) in Chur, Graubünden.

== History ==
Die Südostschweiz was created in 1997 as a spinoff of the Bündner Zeitung newspaper, but soon expanded into a broader press network, Südostschweiz Mediengruppe.

== Profile ==
It is published by Somedia (formerly Südostschweiz Mediengruppe) in Chur, Graubünden. The paper takes a liberal and central political line.

The Südostschweiz has the following regional editions:

- since 1997 Regionalausgabe Graubünden (until 1997 Bündner Zeitung)
- since 2000 Regionalausgabe Glarus (until 2000 Glarner Nachrichten)
- since 2006 Regionalausgabe Gaster und See (until 2000 Gasterländer/Seepresse)

Its circulation was 111,000 in 1997. The Südostschweiz had a circulation of 138,000 copies in 2003. In 2006 the newspaper had a circulation of 139,802 copies. In 2010 the paper had a circulation of 124,760 copies.
