= 20 minutes (Switzerland) =

Swiss daily newspaper

20 Minutes
- Type: Free daily newspaper
- Owner: TX Group
- Founded: 8 March 2006; 20 years ago
- Language: French
- Country: Switzerland
- Sister newspapers: 20 Minuten
- OCLC number: 427962538
- Website: www.20min.ch/fr

20 minutes (French pronunciation: [vɛ̃ minyt] vingt minutes) is a French-language newspaper published in Switzerland, launched on 8 March 2006 by Tamedia for the Romandy. Since December 2025, it has been an online newspaper exclusively.

== History ==
20 minutes was launched on 8 March 2006 by the Swiss media company Tamedia (later renamed TX Group). The newspaper was based on its German-language sister newspaper, 20 Minuten, which was first established in 1999. The name of both papers is derived from the idea that the paper would be read in "20 minutes" while riding the train.

It was established with an initial print run of 120,000. Upon its launch, it competed with another free Swiss French-language paper, Le Matin Bleu, established five months prior. When Tamedia acquired Le Matin Bleu's publisher, Edipresse, in 2008, Le Matin Bleu ceased publication.

In the 2020s, the newspaper faced financial issues due to the decline in print media; in June 2025, they announced the paper would cease its physical edition, alongside job cuts. 20 minutes ceased physical distribution on 23 December 2025, but continues as an online newspaper. The publisher TX Group attributed this decision to declining ad revenue and a change in readership habits.

== Profile ==
20 minutes is a free tabloid that gets revenue from advertising. It does not cover one particular canton and instead covers all of Francophone Switzerland. In 2024, a scholarly analysis noted its "emphasis on immediacy and breaking news", utilizing live blogs and updating their stories several times a day; they noted it as an early example of "digital first" newspaper production, particularly after 2013. Stories in the print edition were often drastically shortened from their web versions after the adoption of this tactic.

== See also ==
- List of free daily newspapers
