= Aargauer Zeitung =

Swiss newspaper

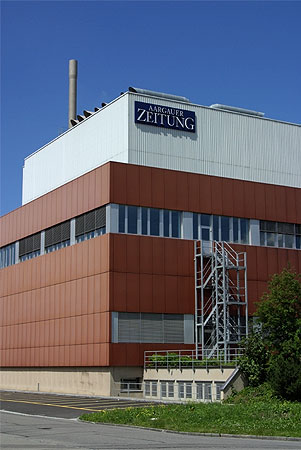
- Aargauer Zeitung's building in Aarau
- Type: Daily newspaper
- Owner: AZ Medien Gruppe
- Founded: 1996
- Language: German
- Country: Switzerland
- ISSN: 2504-4117
- OCLC number: 611044404
- Website: www.aargauerzeitung.ch

Aargauer Zeitung is a Swiss German-language daily newspaper, published by AZ Medien Gruppe. It is published out of Aarau, Aargau, and covers the Aargau canton. It was established in 1996 through the merger of the Aargauer Tagblatt and Badener Tagblatt.

== History ==
The Aagauer Zeitung was created in 1996 through the merger of the Aargauer Tagblatt and Badener Tagblatt newspapers. The head of the board of the directors at the time of the paper's creation was Peter Wanner, who effectively controlled the paper.

Following the start of the merger, a dispute between the city of Aarau and the paper resulted over the new location of the paper. A separate dispute was also ongoing between the new paper and two others, the Zofingen Tagblatt and Olten Tagblatt, who had an arrangement with the prior papers to collect their content under the Mittelland-Zeitung name. When the papers merged the agreement was thrown out by Wanner in an effort to get better conditions for their agreement.

The first issue of the Aargauer Zeitung was dated to 4 November 1996. Beginning in January 2002, the AZ formed a newspaper group including both the Zofingen Tagblatt and Olten Tagblatt as well as the Solothurner Zeitung to establish a common front page for all four papers. The combined front page was produced by the AZ. The four papers kept their names on the common front page but were lettered with the Mittelland-Zeitung name.

Their editor-in-chief Markus Gisler left at the end of 2004 after a disagreement with Wanner over the paper's direction. He was succeeded by Peter Buri, the co-editor.

== Operations ==
The paper is edited in Aarau and Baden, Aargau. It produces several local editions. In 1997 Aargauer Zeitung had a circulation of 118,578 copies. In 1999, it had a circulation of 120,000. It covers the whole Aargau canton as well as Solothurn district of Olten-Gösgen.
