= Le News =

Free biweekly newspaper in Switzerland

- Type: Free biweekly newspaper
- Format: Tabloid
- Editor: Ed Girardet
- Founded: 31 October 2013; 12 years ago
- Language: English
- Headquarters: Lausanne
- Country: Switzerland
- Website: lenews.ch

Le News is an English-language free biweekly newspaper published in Switzerland.

== History and profile ==
Le News was established on 31 October 2013. It is free and published fortnightly, each second Thursday, in tabloid format. The paper, its online news site and its weekly electronic newsletter focus on local and national news. The paper also carries a large entertainment and events section as well as regular humour, lifestyle, property and education sections. The target audience of the paper are those living in the Arc lémanique from Geneva to Montreux. Jeremy McTeague, Daniel Ahlers and Phillip Judd serve as the directors of Le News. Ed Girardet is the managing editor of the paper.

The paper has a print run of 24,000 copies per edition with an estimated readership of 40,000. The weekly electronic newsletter is emailed to over 5,100 recipients each week.
