= L'Express (Switzerland) =

Defunct Swiss daily newspaper

- Type: Daily newspaper
- Owner: Société neuchâteloise de presse SA
- Founded: 2 October 1738
- Language: French
- Headquarters: Neuchâtel, Canton of Neuchâtel
- Country: Switzerland
- Circulation: 28,490 (as of 2003)
- Sister newspapers: L'Impartial
- ISSN: 1660-7457
- OCLC number: 500918212
- Website: www.arcinfo.ch

L'Express (lit. 'The Express') was a Swiss regional French-language daily newspaper published in Neuchâtel. It was published by Société neuchâteloise de presse SA. Originally founded in 1738 as the Feuille d'Avis, it was renamed the Feuille d'avis de Neuchatel (FAN) in 1766. It was renamed L'Express in 1988. It was the oldest still-published French-language newspaper in the world, before it was merged in 2018 with L'Impartial, another Swiss French-language paper, to form ArcInfo.

== History ==
Originally founded in 1738 as the Feuille d'Avis, and was renamed the Feuille d'avis de Neuchatel in 1766. It was created as a weekly, before becoming a twice weekly paper in 1855, a thrice weekly paper in 1873, and eventually becoming a daily newspaper in 1884. The Feuille d'avis de Neuchatel merged with another Neuchâtel paper, L'Express, in 1964. The original L'Express, the other main daily paper of the city, had been founded in 1891; the combined paper later took its name, and Feuille d'avis de Neuchatel was renamed L'Express in 1988.

L'Express covered international, national and local issues. The newspaper's circulation was 28,490 in 2003. It was not tied to any political party, but was generally politically conservative. In 1996, it mostly merged with another Neuchâtel paper, L'Impartial, but had kept their names; the respective companies merged three years later to form Société neuchâteloise de presse SA. Afterwards, the two papers shared much of the same content and an editorial team, but differed in some of their regional coverage.

It was the oldest still-published French-language newspaper in the world, before it was merged in 2018 with L'Impartial to form ArcInfo. This was announced in August 2017 in an op-ed printed in both papers by the co-editor-in-chief Stéphane Devaux, who said things would change at the papers and that they were "in the middle of a vast project", opening up the possibility of merging their distribution. The first issue of the paper was to be printed 23 January 2018, featuring a new layout that was identical even in the regional content. No jobs were lost at either paper in the process of the merger. The name ArcInfo was the name already used for the online versions of both publications.
