= Heute (newspaper) =

- Front page from a 2 April 2008 edition
- Type: daily newspaper
- Owner: Ringier
- Editor: Daniel Steil
- Founded: 15 May 2006; 20 years ago
- Political alignment: Neutral
- Headquarters: Zurich
- Country: Switzerland
- Circulation: 200,000
- OCLC number: 637961425
- Website: Formerly www.heuteonline.ch, now defunct

Heute (literally "Today") was a Swiss German-language daily newspaper, published between 2006 and 2008 by Ringier in Zurich.

== History and operations ==
Published in tabloid format, Heute was first published on 15 May 2006. It was an afternoon paper.

The paper was the second 'Pendlerzeitung (commuter newspaper) in Switzerland, after the morning newspaper 20 Minuten, being distributed in the evenings, from approximately 3 pm.

With a claimed initial print run of 200,000, the newspaper was said to have been one of the most popular daily newspapers in Switzerland according to the publisher's own statistics.

The paper ceased publication with a final edition on 30 May 2008. As from 2 June 2008 Heute was replaced by another free newspaper Blick am Abend.
