= Walliser Bote =

Swiss newspaper

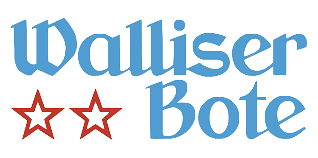
- Type: Daily newspaper
- Founded: 1840
- Language: German
- Headquarters: Brig, Canton of Valais
- Country: Switzerland
- Circulation: 24,046 (as of 2012)
- ISSN: 1660-0657 (print); 2571-8908 (web)
- OCLC number: 610964848
- Website: walliserbote.ch
- Free online archives: e-newspaperarchives.ch

The Walliser Bote is a Swiss German-language daily newspaper established in 1840, published in the Canton of Valais. Established in 1840 as the Der Nachläufer before becoming the Walliser Bote, it had an inconsistent first few decades before establishing itself in 1869. It became a daily in 1969. It was the first German-language paper in Valais.

== History ==
The paper was founded in the Canton of Valais on 28 July 1840. It is published out of Sion, Switzerland, and was the first German-language paper in Valais. Its initial editor was Alois von Riedmatten. It was founded as the Der Nachläufer as an insertion for the Bulletin officiel paper, becoming its own paper a few weeks later as the Walliser Bote. It was until 1900 staffed by the laity, and until 1930 was by Catholic priests.

Its initial period was inconsistent, with it briefly becoming a bilingual paper and renaming itself Le Messager Valaisan. It then ceased publication for a decade, before reappearing from 1851 to 1852, but only briefly. It would reappear in 1858 as the Walliser Wochenblatt, before returning to Walliser Bote in 1869 and being published consistently from then on. From 1916 to 1935 it was published by the company Oberwalliser Presseverein AG, and from 1935 on was published by Mengis Druck & Verlag AG of Visp, which had printed the paper for the past three years. In 1954 the paper established an editorial team with an editor-in-chief.

The paper was first a weekly, then made a twice weekly in 1901, then a thrice weekly in 1965, and ultimately a daily paper in 1969. At this time it was the dominant paper in the German speaking areas of the canton, dominating its competition. Early in its history it had party ties and was Catholic and conservative in orientation, but it became independent in 1981. Following the end of the rival paper Walliser Volksfreund, it had a similar position in the market as the Le Nouvelliste paper of Francophone Valais. In 2012 its circulation was 24,046.
