= 20 Minuten =

Swiss daily newspaper

20 Minuten (English: 20 Minutes)
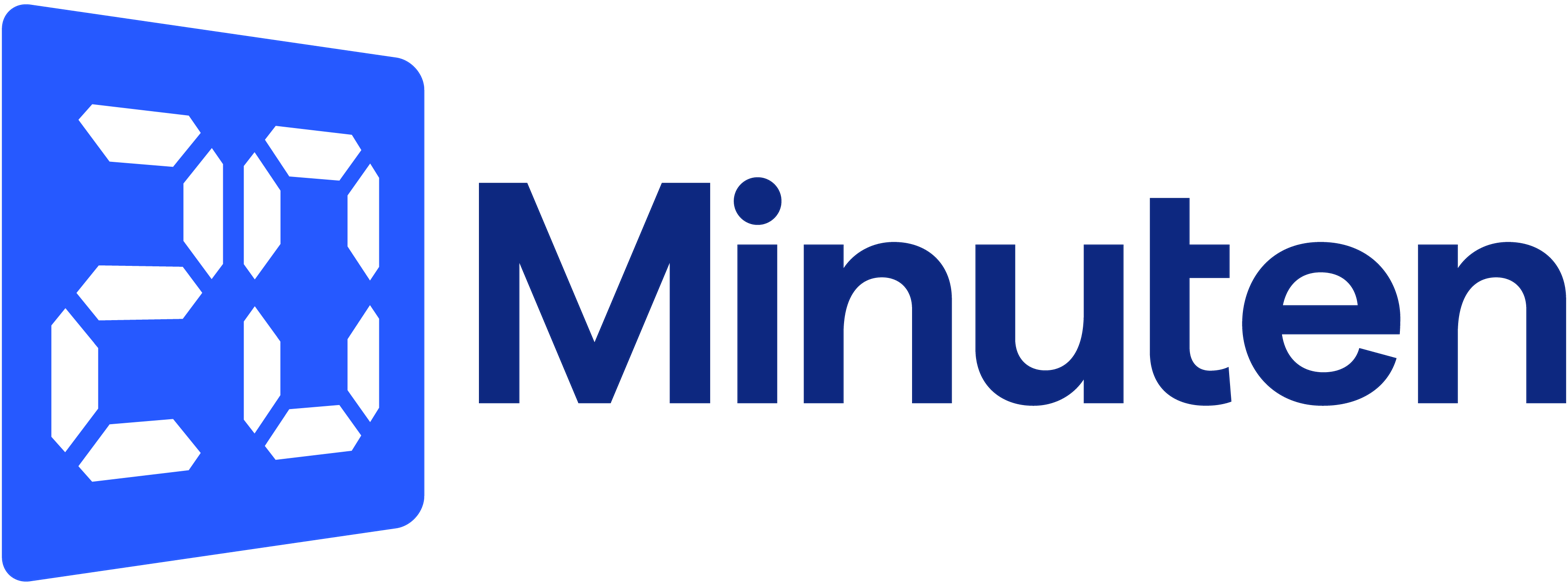
- Type: Free daily newspaper
- Format: Tabloid
- Owner: TX Group
- Founded: 1999; 27 years ago
- Ceased publication: 23 December 2025 (print)
- Language: German
- City: Zurich
- Country: Switzerland
- Circulation: 494,368 (2010)
- Sister newspapers: 20 minutes (French-language edition); 20 minuti (Italian-language edition)
- OCLC number: 611676625
- Website: www.20min.ch (in German); (in French); www.tio.ch/temi/20-minuti (in Italian)

20 Minuten (German pronunciation: [ˈtsvantsɪç miˈnuːtn̩]; "20 Minutes") is a free German-language daily newspaper in Switzerland. Its sister publications, 20 minutes and 20 minuti, serve the French- and Italian-speaking regions, respectively. The print edition was ended in 2025 and partially replaced by online-only offerings.

== History and profile ==
Cofounded by Sacha Wigdorovits, who also became a significant shareholder, 20 Minuten was first published on 13 December 1999 by 20 Minuten Schweiz AG. The direct competitor metropol was available in Switzerland between 2000 and 2002. The paper version of 20 Minuten is published in tabloid format.

In 2005 the newspaper was sold to Express-Zeitung AG, which is jointly owned by TX Group (majority holding) and Berner Zeitung (17.5%). As of 2025, it is owned by TX Group.

It is based out of Zurich. In the German-speaking parts of Switzerland, specific editions are made for the regions of Basel, Bern, Lucerne, St. Gallen and Zurich.

=== End of print edition ===
The TX Group announced in June 2025 that the printed version would be discontinued at the end of the year, due to sinking revenues in that format. The rapidly changing media landscape was also cited. The announcement by 20 Minuten, signed by both CEO Bernhard Brechbühl and (from 1 September 2025) editor-in-chief Désirée Pomper, hinted that some use of the existing newspaper distribution boxes might be found, perhaps for some as yet unknown "innovation" on paper.

The cessation of the printed versions brought with it a reorganization and loss of jobs. Some 80 full-time positions were expected to be terminated. Four regional bureaus were closed, with a national editing office based in Lausanne, Bern and Zürich to replace them. The French-language 20 minutes moved to an online-only presence, with Philippe Favre as the directeur Romandie. The Italian-language paper, 20 minuti, migrated to an online portal at the end of 2025.

== Circulation ==
20 Minuten was distributed to commuters at over 150 train stations across the country. Since September 2004 the German-language edition has been the most widely read daily newspaper in Switzerland, surpassing Blick. The audited distribution in 2004 was 329,242 (WEMF AG) and it had a readership of an estimated 782,000. In 2010 its circulation was 494,368 copies, making it the most-read daily paper in the country.

For the year ending 31 March 2024, the total audited (provisional) circulation of all issues of the 20 Minuten Group was 445,141, including all German regional editions (298,429 total) as well as the French (123,147) and Italian (23,565) issues.

== See also ==
- List of free daily newspapers
