= WEMF AG für Werbemedienforschung =

Swiss audience measurement company

- Industry: Media
- Founded: 1964
- Headquarters: Bachmattstrasse 53, CH-8048 Zürich, Switzerland
- Area served: Switzerland and Liechtenstein
- Key people: Marco Bernasconi, CEO
- Services: Verification of circulation (MACH)
- Number of employees: 20
- Website: Official website

The WEMF AG für Werbemedienforschung collects figures on media usage in Switzerland and Liechtenstein.

== Tasks ==
According to its own statements, WEMF "provides, as a neutral and independent industry research organisation, transparency in the media and advertising market". In Switzerland and Liechtenstein, this includes national readership research and the certification of print media editions, marketing-related studies and statistics in the media and advertising sector. The WEMF MACH research system is relevant for print media, cinema and sponsorship. With the "MACH Consumer", WEMF publishes the largest annual consumer study in Switzerland, and compiles comparative data for the evaluation of different media ("MA Strategy"), as well as the study "Total Audience", which combines press data with online data.

== Organisation ==
WEMF was founded in 1964 as a "neutral, not-for-profit research organisation" in order to create transparency in the media and advertising market. The founders and shareholders were four interest groups in the Swiss advertising industry. WEMF is organised as an Aktiengesellschaft under Swiss law. The association holds 100% of the shares (share capital CHF 1,000,000) and does not pursue any profit-making purpose. It elects the board of directors of WEMF. The general assembly is the supreme organ of the association.
