= Anarchism in Switzerland =

Anarchism in Switzerland appeared, as a political current, within the Jura Federation of the International Workingmen's Association (IWA), under the influence of Mikhail Bakunin and Swiss libertarian activists such as James Guillaume and Adhémar Schwitzguébel. Swiss anarchism subsequently evolved alongside the nascent social democratic movement and participated in the local opposition to fascism during the interwar period. The contemporary Swiss anarchist movement then grew into a number of militant groups, libertarian socialist organizations and squats.

== History ==
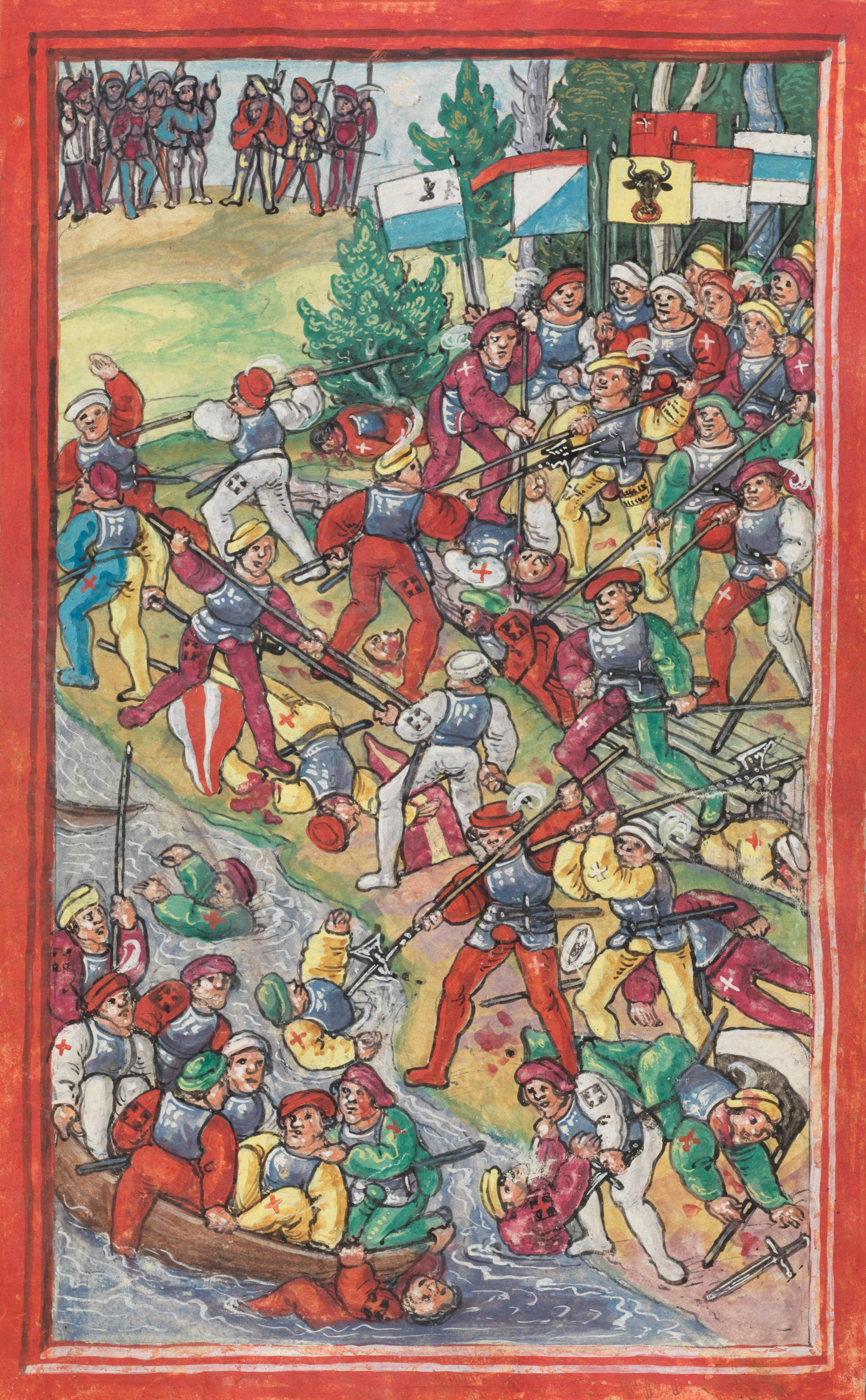
The Battle of Hard, one of the battles of the Swabian War, which resulted in the de facto independence of the Swiss Confederacy

In August 1291, an alliance was formed between the cantons of Uri, Schwyz and Unterwalden, establishing the Swiss Confederacy with imperial immediacy, which allowed for the territory's autonomy from the Holy Roman Empire. During the growth of the Old Swiss Confederacy throughout the 14th and 15th centuries, it continued to assert its autonomy through a number of conflicts against noble houses such as the Habsburgs and the Burgundians, eventually achieving de facto independence from the empire after its victory in the Swabian War, which exempted the Confederacy from the decisions of the Imperial Diet. In its place, the Swiss Confederacy established the Federal Diet, a regular meeting of cantonal delegates with only limited powers. The Diet was the only form of federal authority in Switzerland and the cantons remained essentially sovereign.

During the Protestant Reformation, social inequality grew significantly, as more political and economic power became concentrated in the hands of a few rich families, which began to draw resentment from peasants and free citizens. In response to the rise of these oligarchies, popular revolts started to break out in many of the cantons, with the objective of restoring common democratic rights. Despite the cantonal authorities managing to subdue these uprisings through the granting of concessions, autocratic tendencies continued to slowly transform the democratic cantons into oligarchies, culminating in the establishment of the absolutist Ancien Régime in 1648, with the recognition of Swiss independence from the Holy Roman Empire. But the institution of absolutism in Switzerland soon led to the Swiss peasant war of 1653, which resulted in the implementation of a series of reforms including the lowering of taxes, ultimately preventing the country from completely implementing absolutism as had occurred in France under Louis XIV.

In 1798, the French invasion of Switzerland brought about the collapse of the Old Confederacy, which was replaced with the Helvetic Republic, representing an attempt to impose a central authority over Switzerland. However, a federalist revolt eventually overthrew the Republic, restoring the cantons and re-establishing a federal and decentralized Swiss Confederation. Following the defeat and dissolution of the First French Empire in the War of the Sixth Coalition, Cantonal constitutions began to be worked out independently and the Federal Diet was reconvened to replace the constitution with a new Federal Treaty, beginning the restoration of the Ancien Régime.

But the restoration of the Swiss ruling class brought with it a rise in liberalism and radicalism, calling for greater democracy in the Swiss cantons. Following the July Revolution, cantonal assemblies were held calling for new cantonal constitutions, particularly focused on the implementation of proportional representation and the ability to propose citizens' initiatives. As liberal and radical groups attained more power, they began to institute widespread reforms including the abolition of censorship, the separation of church and state, the recognition of popular sovereignty and the introduction of representative democracy. In 1848, Switzerland was officially constituted as a federal state, imposing a central government made up of representatives of a new National Assembly.

With the outbreak of the Paris Commune, the anarchist James Guillaume drew a contrast between the federalism practiced by the communards with the federalism of Switzerland. According to Guillaume, the Parisian conception of federalism, as inspired by the philosophy of Pierre-Joseph Proudhon, was organized in direct opposition to nationalism and statism, whereas Swiss federalism maintained the nation-state, albeit organized through decentralization.

=== The International and early Swiss anarchism ===
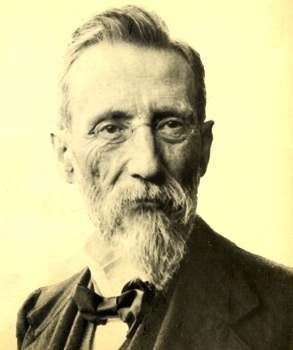
James Guillaume, one of the Swiss delegates to the IWA's Basel Congress

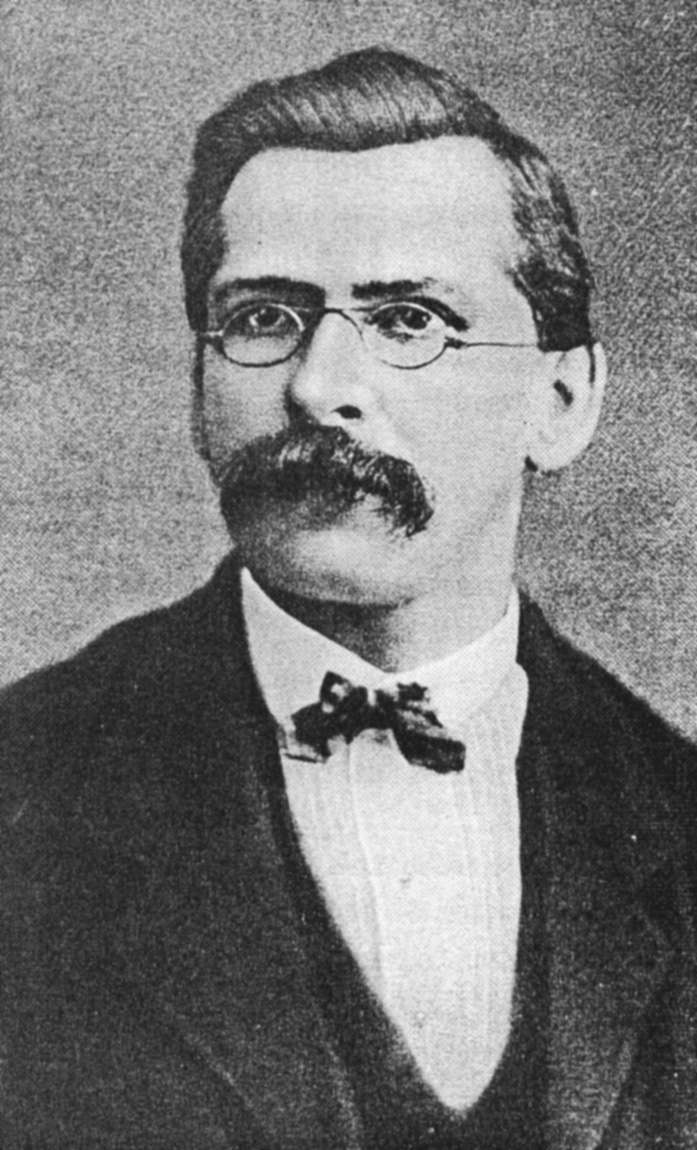
Adhémar Schwitzguébel, one of the Swiss delegates to the IWA's Basel Congress

The re-establishment of the Swiss confederation in 1848 provided a safe haven for many European revolutionaries, many of which had been forced into exile by the monarchist regimes that largely ruled the continent at the time. These expatriates included a significant number of revolutionary socialists and anarchists, who began to lay the groundwork for the labor movement in the country.

Following the repression of the January Uprising in Poland, European workers began to discuss the need for an international organization, culminating in the 1864 founding of the International Workingmen's Association (IWA). In September 1866, the IWA convened its first congress in Geneva, during which the French mutualists came to dominate the discussion, with native Swiss trade unions and educational societies also in attendance, concluding its activities by taking up the demand for the universal establishment of the eight-hour day. The following September, the IWA's second congress was convened in Lausanne, where the majority of delegates came from the local Swiss labor movement. It was during this second congress that the international took on a more explicitly socialist program. Here too the mutualists were predominant in the discussions of the congress, raising debates on national banks, trade union investments and education, ultimately bringing about the approval of resolutions to "induce the trade unions to devote their funds to cooperative production" to institute free, compulsory and secular education, and to call for the public ownership of transportation.

Shortly after the Lausanne Congress, the inaugural congress of the League of Peace and Freedom was held in Geneva, coordinated with the aim of achieving peace between European nations and the establishment of a "United States of Europe". This congress saw the participation of a number of prominent anarchists, including Mikhail Bakunin and Élisée Reclus, who joined the league's central committee. However, the League's second congress in Bern marked a split between the organization's liberal democratic majority and the anarchist minority, which caused Bakunin, Reclus, Mroczkowski and Fanelli to leave the League and establish the International Alliance of Socialist Democracy, which soon dissolved itself into the various national sections of the IWA.

Stamp of the Jura Federation, an anarchist section of the IWA based in Romandy

In September 1869, the IWA's fourth congress was convened in Basel, in which the Swiss delegates included the anarchists James Guillaume and Adhémar Schwitzguébel. This congress saw the French section, which was largely composed of mutualists such as Henri Tolain, Eugène Varlin and Benoît Malon, become isolated from the International by the growing Marxist faction.

In the wake of this excision, on October 9, 1870, anti-authoritarian and anarchist sections of the IWA's Romandy Federation went on to found the Jura Federation during a meeting in Saint-Imier. The federation published the Sonvilier Circular in 1871, which aligned it against hierarchical political parties and advocated for horizontal revolutionary organizations that modelled themselves after the future society they wished to bring about. When the anarchist faction was expelled from the IWA at the International's fifth congress, the Jura Federation organized a rival congress in Saint-Imier. The congress resolved to reject the expulsion of anarchists from the IWA and other resolutions of the Hague Congress and the International's General Council, which they deemed as authoritarian. From the libertarian section of the split rose the Anti-Authoritarian International, which they claimed to be to true heirs of the IWA.

In September 1873, the two rival Internationals both held separate sixth congresses in Geneva. The Congress of the Marxist section proved to be a failure, as only a small number of regional federations participated and the General Council was itself unable to attend, leading it to eventually dissolve itself. Whereas the anarchist congress was attended by delegates from all over western Europe, with a federation from the United States even announcing its accession to the anarchist International. The anarchists agreed to the formal dissolution of the General Council and the autonomy of local federations, as well as the adoption of the general strike as a revolutionary tactic for the first time.

In 1874, Mikhail Bakunin retired to Minusio and died on July 1, 1876. Following Bakunin's death, a number of debates began to emerge within the anarchist movement, concerning the concepts of insurrectionism, syndicalism and anarcho-communism. In September 1876, the International held its eighth congress in Bern, during which the proposal to open up the International to non-anarchist organizations was debated. Subsequent congresses thus took positions that were increasingly favorable to Russian populism and nihilism, approving of more radical tactics like propaganda of the deed. Debates also took place between the collectivist position of Bakunin and the newly synthesized anarcho-communism, which was proposed by Peter Kropotkin, with the Jura Federation officially adopting anarcho-communism at its congress in La Chaux-de-Fonds. Kropotkin and Reclus also founded the Jura Federation's official newspaper Le Révolté on February 22, 1879, and published a number of revolutionary pamphlets, although the political fallout that followed the assassination of Alexander II of Russia in 1881 led to Kropotkin's expulsion from Switzerland. By this time, the Anti-Authoritarian International and the Jura Federation had both largely dissolved.

=== Social democracy and syndicalism ===
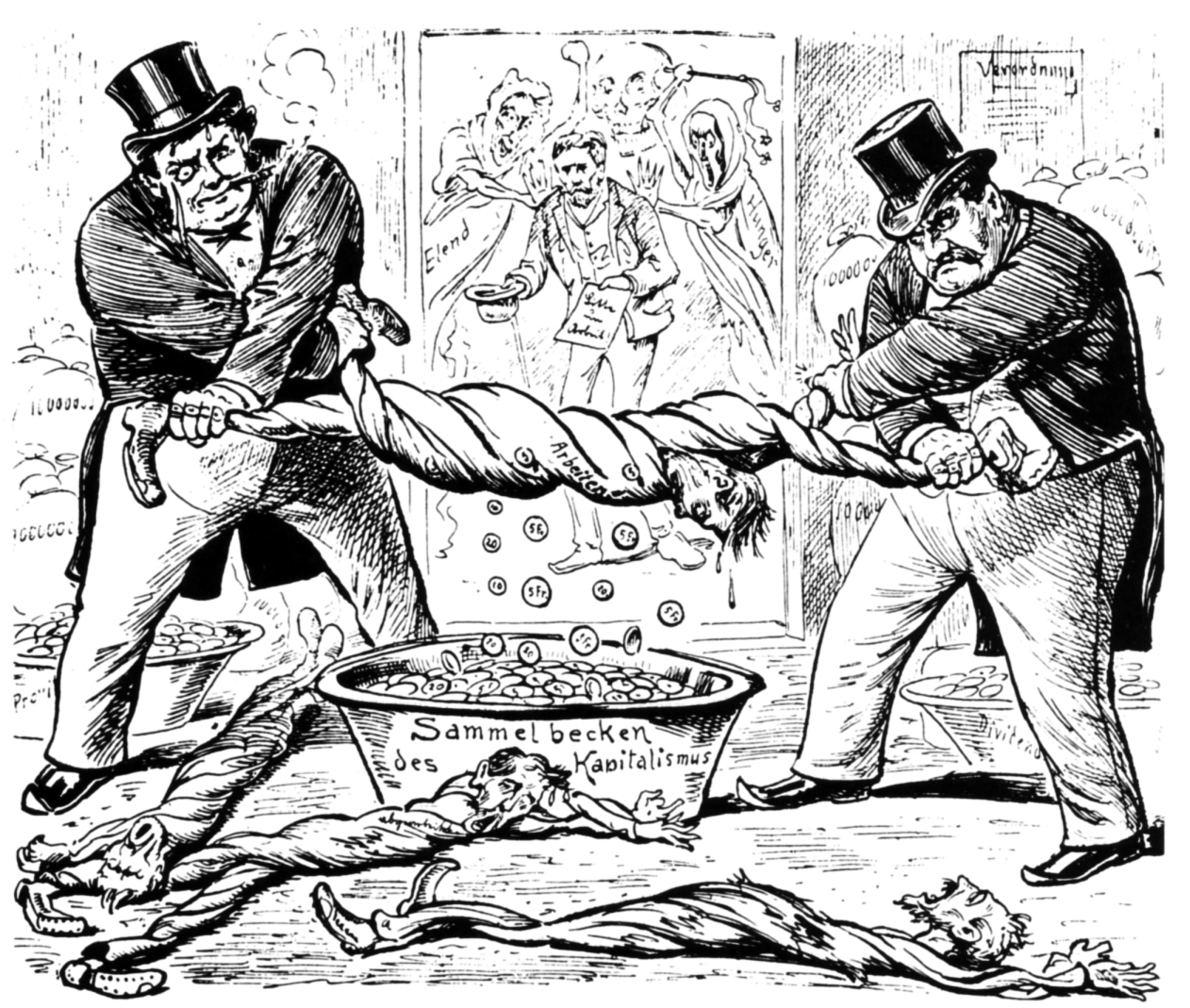
"The new relationship between workers and entrepreneurs", an 1896 satirical cartoon on bad working conditions in Swiss factories

As a result of the split in the International, the socialist movement within Switzerland became split across the same lines. In Romandy, anarchism became the predominant tendency, whereas in German-speaking Switzerland, it was social democratic tendencies that took the lead.

When the Social Democratic Party was founded in 1888, a number of German-speaking anarchists and syndicalists joined the party and its affiliated trade unions, influencing party policy towards anarchist, federalist and syndicalist ideas. However, anarchist activists were often the target of expulsion by Swiss authorities, a practice which was even applied by social democratic police officials. German and Austrian anarchists were only able to briefly agitate in Switzerland before themselves being expelled, at the behest of social democratic figures. The social democrats also led to expulsion of anarchists from the Zürich Socialist and Labour Congress, which had been convened by the Second International. The Social Democrats went on to win their first eat in the National Council during the 1896 Swiss federal election.

Nevertheless, the influence of anarcho-syndicalism had brought with it the strategy of the mass strike, as the early 1900s saw a wave of localized general strikes spread through the country, despite Swiss trade union leaders remaining largely skeptical of the practice. The anti-strike rhetoric that followed in their wake saw a surge in anti-semitic and xenophobic conspiracy theories, which blamed the strikes on Jewish speculators and foreign anarchist revolutionaries.

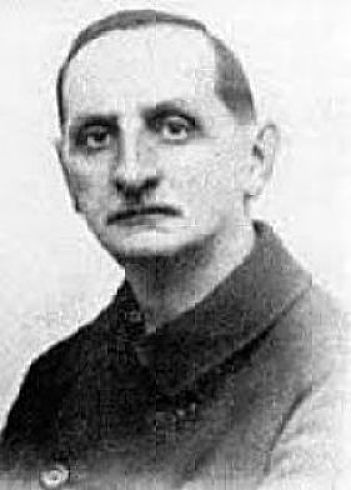
Luigi Bertoni, founder of the bilingual anarchist newspaper Il Risveglio anarchico

The Swiss anarchist press also began to flourish during this period. In 1900, Il Risveglio anarchico was established by a group of Italian emigrants and exiles, led by Luigi Bertoni, in collaboration with Romand anarchists such as Jean Wintsch and Jacques Gross. The paper published an Italian language edition and a French language edition, which published different articles and had different target audiences. There was also a brief period between 1903 and 1907 when a German language edition was published. On May 1, 1914, the newspaper Le Falot was founded by a group of anarchists, syndicalists and free thinkers in Valais, declaring that it would not be the organ of any political party and instead defended the syndicalist route of organizing through trade unions, taking advantage of the prohibition of socialist newspapers. Le Falot demonstrated concern about the living conditions of immigrant workers and denounced the poor conditions offered in various localities, as well as discrimination against Arabs in Switzerland.

After the outbreak of World War I, when the Social Democratic Party began to pursue the policy of Burgfrieden, they received criticism from a number of far-left groups, including even the Young Socialists, who had come under the influence of the anarchist physician Fritz Brupbacher and the pacifist theologian Leonhard Ragaz. Anarchic tendencies continued to proliferate within the Young Socialists throughout the 20th century, particularly in the Bern section, which eventually began pushing for the abolition of the Social Democratic Party's central presidium.

During the war, the price of basic necessities rose while wages sank. Some workers were drafted into the military, but were not compensated for their lost wages and were even paid less than they had been in industrial work. The issues of Le Falot criticized the war as an "absurd massacre" and held that the remedy to the present conditions was through trade union organization. The newspaper took a leading role in developing trade unions, forming a union of about 150 workers in Vouvry, with a total of 12 unions being created by the initiative before the end of 1916. In January 1917, the Workers' Federation of Valais (FVO) was founded and Le Falot became its official body, publishing reports from the FVO secretariat and information about the various sections. The Dada movement also emerged in Zürich out of a reaction to the war, developing an art style from anti-capitalist and anarchist philosophies that expressed itself through nonsense and irrationality. Meanwhile, the heightened inequalities, combined with the new political climate that followed in the wake of the Russian Revolution, led leaders of the Social Democratic Party, labor unions and the left-wing press to establish the Olten Action Committee (OAK), in order to provide a unified leadership for the labor movement.

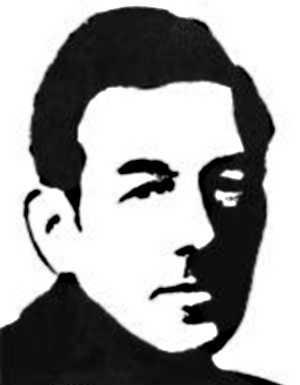
Clovis-Abel Pignat, founder of the bilingual anarcho-syndicalist newspaper Le Falot

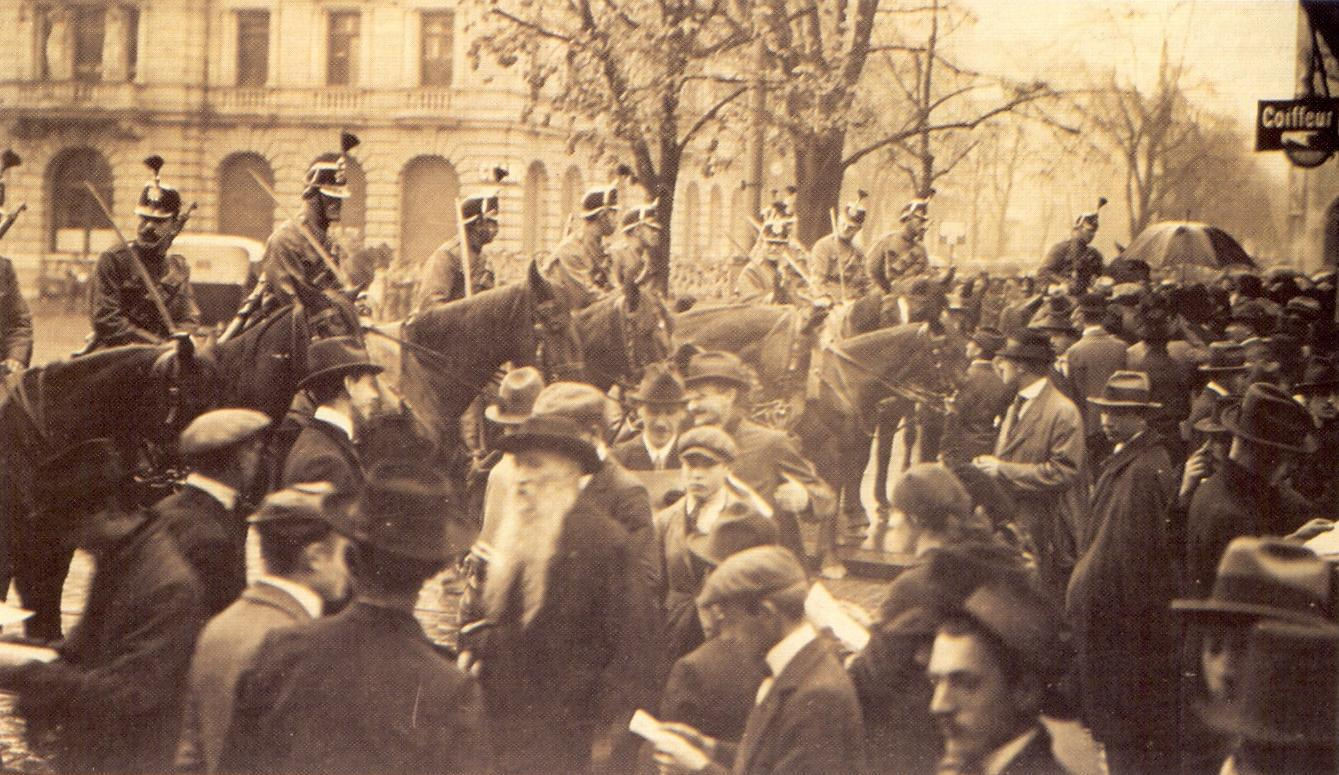
Confrontations between striking workers and soldiers during the 1918 Swiss general strike

On October 9, 1918, an explosives store with material of German origin discovered in the Seebach embankment near Zürich, which previously had been attributed to sabotage preparations by the German Consulate, was traced back to a fictitious anarchist group by the right-wing district attorney Otto Heusser and increased fear of revolution among the bourgeoisie. These fears of revolution led to the Federal Council deploying a military occupation of Zürich in November 1918, claiming that due to the economic and political instability the troops were needed to maintain order. The city's labor unions accused the government of attempting to establish a military dictatorship and the OAK called for a peaceful one-day strike in Swiss cities, in a move which Zürich's local labor leaders considered overly cautious. During a planned celebration of the first anniversary of the October Revolution, and following news of the German Revolution successfully overthrowing the monarchy, the military violently dispersed protesting crowds in Zürich. The OAK responded to these altercations by proclaiming a general strike and calling for nine demands, including the institution of proportional representation, women's suffrage, the 48-hour week and the reorganization of the military into a "people's army". But the government responded by rejecting the demands and mobilizing the Army. The general strike was therefore initiated on November 12, with its greatest participation coming from the industrial areas of German-speaking Switzerland. Clovis-Abel Pignat, on the first page of Le Falot of December 1, analyzed the situation and proposed to adopt a program in case of victory of the Revolution in Valais. He was himself persuaded by the imminence of change: "From the train where the events are going to the countries around us, it is to be expected that its implementation will be soon. There are currents that it is unnecessary to bring back, and despite the fierce obstructionism by the owning and governing classes, the popular will will eventually triumph. For all conscious men, there is not a minute to spare. Groups must train everywhere to undertake extensive propaganda among the people. The day of salvation is approaching. Let's go ready!" However, the Federal Assembly passed several measures to break the strike, giving the OAK an ultimatum to call it off, which they complied with. In Basel and Zürich, many workers initially refused to believe that the strike had been called off, with some radical union leaders such as Ernst Nobs even ignoring the decision entirely. But eventually the moderate leaders prevailed and work largely resumed as normal. By the end of the strike, some workers had already been killed by soldiers, while many of the union leaders were trialed and convicted for their involvement. With the defeat of the strike, debates on the organization of political training and election participation came back in the columns of Le Falot. By November 12, 1919, the newspaper had ceased publication entirely, ending its first editorial era.

Nevertheless, the general strike marked a turning point for the Swiss left-wing. In the 1919 Swiss federal election, the Social Democratic Party made massive gains, doubling their seats in the National Council, while in the subsequent election they gained their first seat in the Council of States. On March 6, 1921, the Communist Party of Switzerland was founded by far-left dissidents that were expelled from the SDP, one of which was the libertarian socialist Fritz Brupbacher, although he would later also be expelled from the Communist Party due to his criticisms of Stalinism.

=== Anti-fascism ===
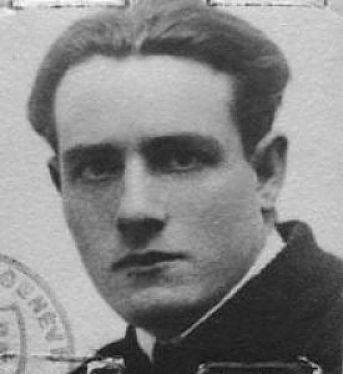
Lucien Tronchet, leader of the interwar anarcho-syndicalist and anti-fascist movement

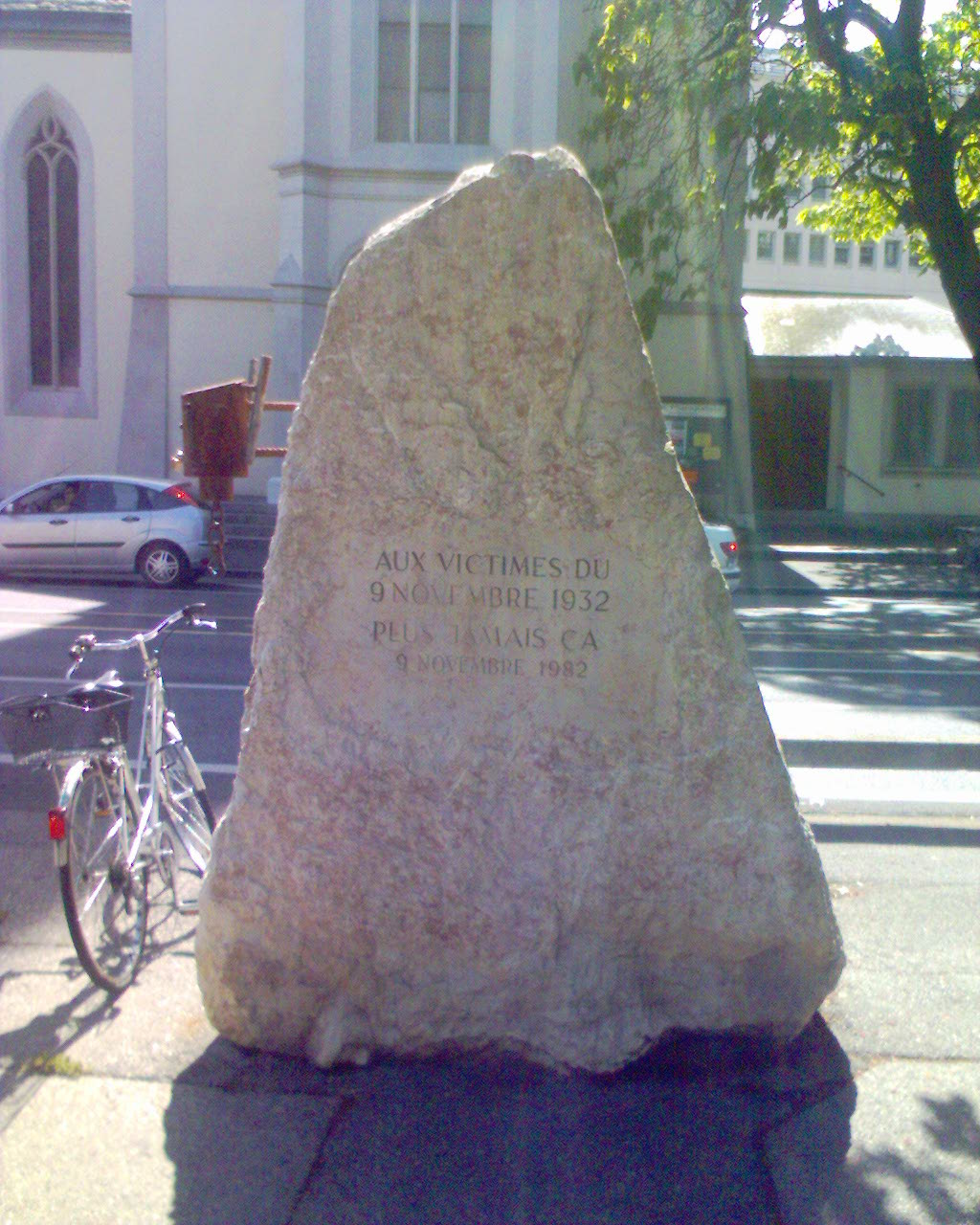
Monument to the victims of the Geneva fusillade of 9 November 1932

In October 1922, the March on Rome resulted in the National Fascist Party taking power and establishing a fascist regime in Italy. Il Risveglio anarchico began to aim its Italian language edition at Italian anti-fascists, who were now part of a growing resistance movement. Many Italian anti-fascist refugees sought asylum in Switzerland, where they were able to continue agitation due to the democratic and libertarian political climate.

Fascism first spread to Switzerland not long after, as the anti-communist Union de défense économique (UDE) was established in 1923 by former members of the Radical and Liberal parties, winning seats in the Federal Council and Grand Council of Geneva. In 1932, it merged with Georges Oltramare's fascist political party the Ordre politique nacional to establish the National Union. The Union, known for its antisemitism, organized a mock trial of the socialist leaders Léon Nicole and Jacques Dicker at Plainpalais in Geneva. A counter-demonstration was called by the Swiss left-wing, with anarchist protestors being organized by Lucien Tronchet and André Bösiger, in order to shut down the meeting. Between 4,000 and 5,000 protestors gathered at Plainpalais, a few anarchists were among the demonstrators to breach the police cordon and briefly gain access to the building and attempt to disrupt the meeting, before being thrown out. But the Swiss Army had been deployed in order to suppress the demonstration, which was finally dispersed after 10 people were shot and killed by the armed forces. Among the dead was the libertarian socialist militant Melchior Allemann, a close friend of Bösiger's. In the aftermath, the Gruppe 33 was founded in Basel by a collective of avant-garde and surrealist artists, united out of a shared anti-fascist political ideology.

During the Spanish Civil War, Swiss anarchists sent arms, money and supplies to Spanish anarcho-syndicalists and coordinated links between Spanish agricultural collectives and Swiss consumer cooperatives. Some Swiss anarchists, like Clara Thalmann, even fought in the confederal militias. With the outbreak of World War II and Switzerland maintaining its neutrality, the fascist political parties dissolved and the Communist Party was banned for its support of the Molotov–Ribbentrop Pact. By 1943, the Federal Council made a decision to crack down on all groups linked to the Axis powers.

=== Contemporary anarchist movement ===
In 1957, the Centre International de Recherches sur l'Anarchisme (CIRA) was founded in Geneva, moving to Lausanne in 1965. It was established as an archive of anarchist works, functioning as an infoshop and library of anarchist materials in various different languages.

During the 1970s, anarchism took a more militant turn in Switzerland. A small group of conscienscous objectors that had met in prison formed the Fasel Gang in 1977 and committed a series of robberies, before being caught, and subsequently organizing a series of prison breaks. In 1979, the environmentalist activist Marco Camenisch sabotaged a power station at Bad Ragaz with explosives, himself being arrested not long after and also escaping from prison. It was later reported that he had killed a border guard when fleeing to Italy. The Swiss anarchist Werner Sauber also took part in the 2 June Movement, which carried out a number of attacks throughout West Germany.

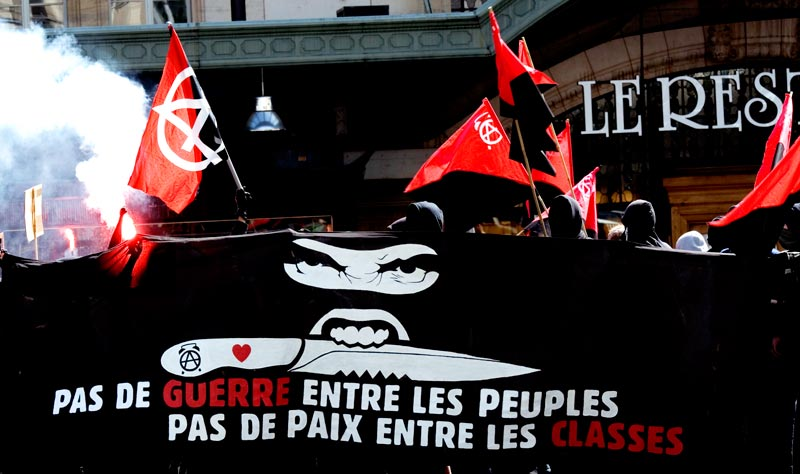
Demonstration by Autonomous Action on May Day, in Lausanne

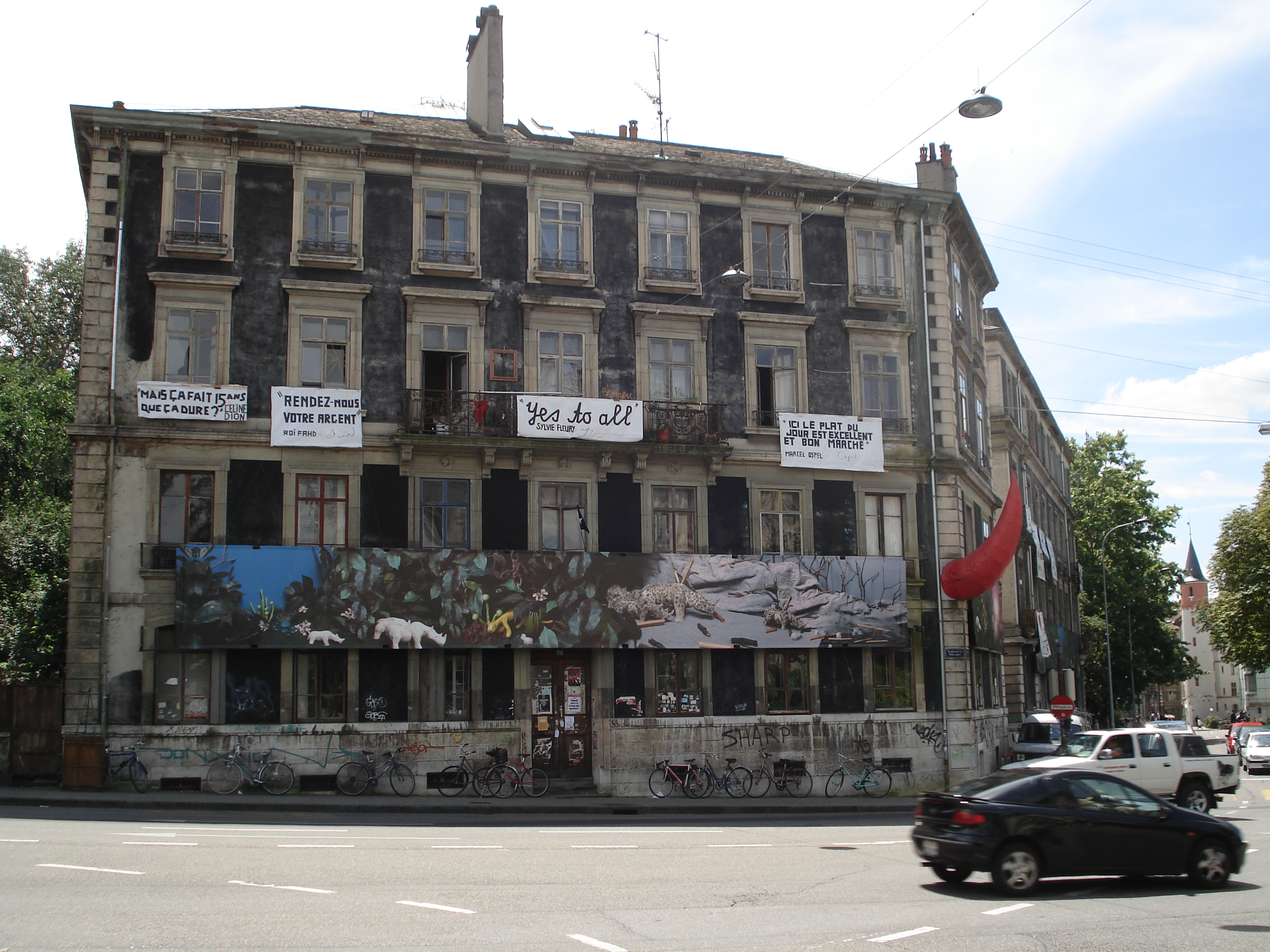
RHINO building with the famous red horn

In 1978, the Libertarian Federation of the Mountains (French: Fédération Libertaire des Montagnes) was founded, which published the Bulletin de l’Agence de presse libertaire in 1978–1979, then Le Réveil anarchiste from 1979 to 1983. In 1982, it came together with other anarchist organizations in Vaud and Bienne to establish the Libertarian Socialist Organisation (French: Organisation socialiste libertaire, OSL), which acted as a federation of libertarian socialist groups throughout Romandy. The OSL published a quarterly review Confrontations from 1988 to 1996 and a newsletter Rebellion from 1997.

It was at this time that the Geneva squatters movement also began to take off. Throughout the 1980s a number of vacant properties were occupied, the most notable of which was RHINO, a squat first occupied in 1988 that housed seventy people up until its eventual eviction in 2007. From out of the squatters movement, the libertarian communist organization Autonomous Action was founded in 2007, with local groups in Geneva, Valais and Vaud.

While Swiss anarchism has historically been a phenomenon in Romandy, in 2010 Libertarian Action Winterthur (LAW) was founded in Zürich and has organized anarchist festivals and bookfairs in German-speaking Switzerland. Like the OSL, LAW contributes to the Anarkismo.net project.

== See also ==
- Category:Swiss anarchists
- List of anarchist movements by region
- Anarchism in Austria
- Anarchism in France
- Anarchism in Germany
- Anarchism in Italy

== Bibliography and sources ==
- "Anarchisme". Historical Dictionary of Switzerland (in French). 17 June 2002.
- Thomann, Charles (1947). Le Mouvement anarchiste dans les Montagnes neuchâteloises et le Jura bernois (PDF) (Thesis) (in French). La Chaux-de-Fonds: University of Neuchâtel: Imprimerie des Coopératives Réunies.
- Elsig Riederalp, Alexandre (2009). La Ligue d'action du bâtiment (1929-vers 1935), L'éphémère emprise de l'anarcho-syndicalisme sur les chantiers genevois (PDF) (Master's) (in French). University of Fribourg., Genève, Éditions d’en bas, Collège du travail, 2015.
  - Barenboim, Axel (April 2017). "La Ligue d'action du bâtiment (1929-vers 1935), L'éphémère emprise de l'anarcho-syndicalisme sur les chantiers genevois". Le Mouvement social (in French) (261).
- Enckell, Marianne (2012). La Fédération jurassienne (PDF) (in French). Geneva/Paris: Entremonde. ISBN 978-2-940426-16-4.
  - Ubbiali, Georges (5 April 2013). "Marianne Enckell, La Fédération jurassienne. Les origines de l'anarchisme en Suisse". Dissidences (in French).
- Collectif (2010). "L'anarchisme dans le Jura bernois et les Montagnes neuchâteloises" (PDF) (in French). Bibliothèque de la Ville de La Chaux-de-Fonds.
- de Roulet, Daniel (2018). Dix petites anarchistes: roman (in French). Paris: Buchet-Chastel. ISBN 978-2-283-03178-0.
- Bochsler, Regula (2019). Dynamitage du Palais fédéral ce mois-ci. Tremblez!. anarchistes en Suisse (in French). Swissinfo.

=== Videography ===
- Gérald Mury, Christian Liardet, Jeunes contestataires, Regards, Radio télévision suisse, 5 October 1971, voir en ligne.
- Jacqueline Veuve, Diane de Rham, Militer ou subir, Radio télévision suisse, 20 September 1978, voir en ligne.
- Pascal Bourquin, L'esprit de Bakounine, Tj-Régions, Radio télévision suisse, 31 October 1996, voir en ligne.
