= André Bösiger =

Swiss trade unionist (1913–2005)

- Born: 22 July 1913; Perrefitte, Bern, Switzerland
- Died: 13 April 2005 (aged 91); Geneva, Switzerland
- Known for: Anarcho-syndicalism, anti-fascism

André Bösiger (22 July 1913, Perrefitte – Geneva, 13 April 2005) was a Swiss anarcho-syndicalist. An activist of the Building Action League in Geneva, he collaborated with the Réveil anarchiste and the International Center for Research on Anarchism (Lausanne).

== Biography ==
A construction worker, he joined the Building Action League where he befriended the anarchists Luigi Bertoni (editor of Il Risveglio anarchico) and Lucien Tronchet. The Building Action League actively practiced sabotage and direct action as well as helping unemployed people that were evicted from their homes.

He also participated in the anarchist group of Geneva and took part in the activities of freethought.

On 9 November 1932, he took part in the demonstration to prevent the holding of a public conference of the National Union, a fascist political party created by Georges Oltramare, in the communal hall of Plainpalais in Geneva. A detachment of the Swiss Army was called in as reinforcements for the maintenance of order, but it was inexperienced and poorly commanded. After several soldiers were assaulted and disarmed, the officers gave the order to open fire, killing thirteen people and injuring 65 others. Among the victims of the shooting was Bösiger's best friend, Melchior Allemann.

Convicted twice for insubordination to the army, Bösiger served a first sentence of two months in 1934, then another of sixteen months which ended in March 1937.

During the Spanish Civil War, he procured arms for the companions of the CNT and took charge of orphans, and was expelled from France for these actions.

Dismissed for “union activity”, he became a poacher, then supplied the maquis of the French Resistance during World War II.

In 1957, he participated in the founding of the International Center for Research on Anarchism (CIRA) in Geneva.

During the Algerian War, he hosted separatists and rebels from the French army.

On 19 July 1990, he lost his partner and fellow anarchist activist Ruth Bösiger.

== Works ==
- Souvenirs d'un rebelle, Canevas éditeur, 1992.
- Souvenirs d’un rebelle - Soixante ans de lutte d’un libertaire jurassien, with the collaboration of Alexandre Skirda, text presented by Marianne Enckell and Ariane Miéville, illustrations by Jean-Pierre Ducret, Atelier de création libertaire, 2017, ISBN 978-2-35104-097-3, présentation éditeur.
