= Paulette Brupbacher =

Belarus-born Swiss doctor and anarcha-feminist (1880–1967)

Paulette Brupbacher (Russian: Паулетта Брупбахер, romanized: Pauletta Brupbakher), née Paulette Raygrodsky (16 January 1880, Pinsk - 31 December 1967, Unterendingen) was a doctor and libertarian feminist.

A Neo-Malthusian, she advocated for birth control and the right to abortion.

She was the second wife of Fritz Brupbacher, who wrote the preface for her Russian-to-French translation of Bakunin's Confession, which was published in Paris in 1932. She often visited James Guillaume and Peter Kropotkin.

== Biography ==
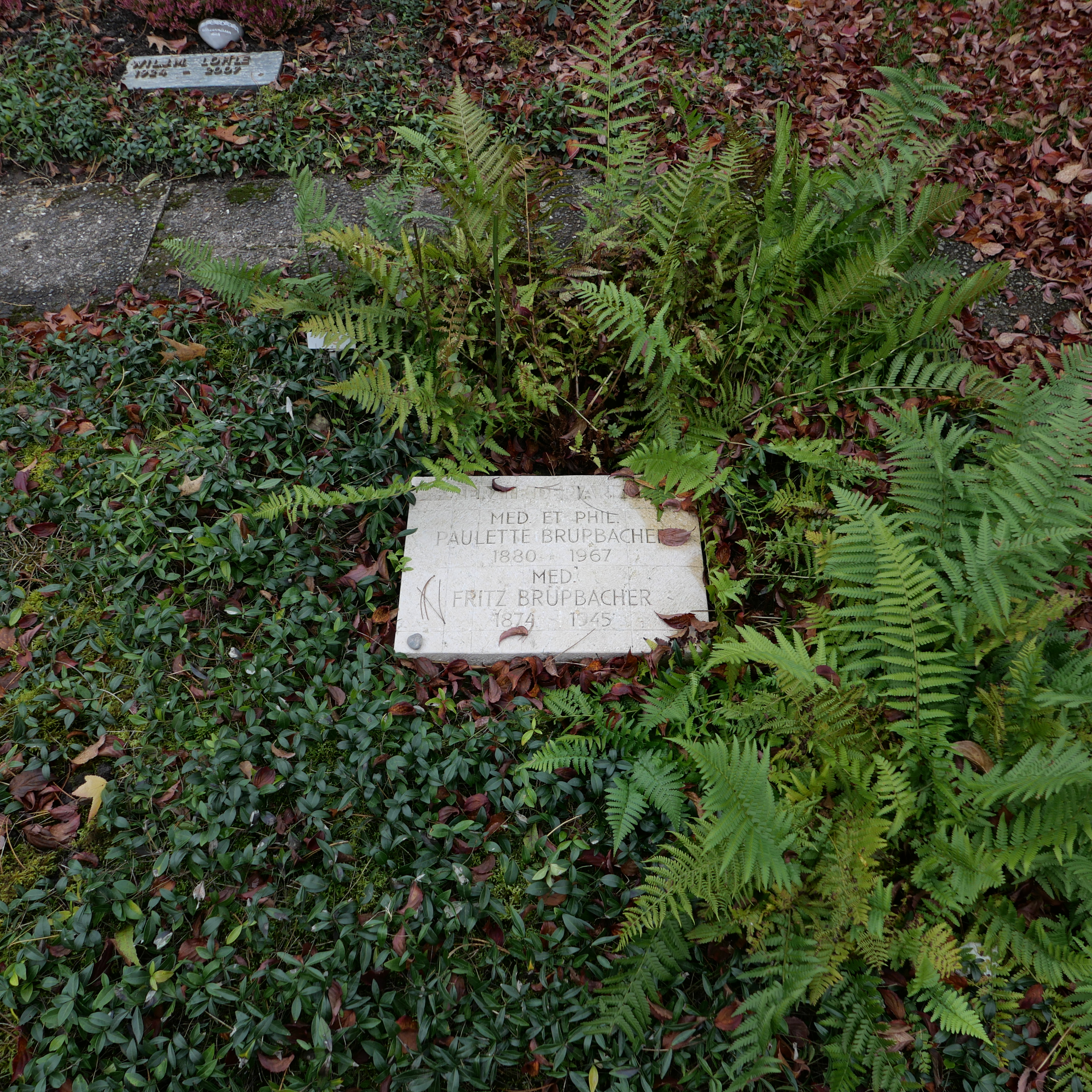
Funerary urn of Paulette et Fritz Brupbacher at the Hönggerberg cemetery in Zurich. The gravestone bears the inscription : "DOCTORS OF THE POOR".

She studied philosophy in Bern from 1902, attaining her doctorate in 1907. She then moved to Geneva and studied medicine. In 1924 she divorced her first husband, Abraham Gutzeit, and opened a practice with her second husband, Fritz Brupbacher, in Zurich. Combining her work as a doctor with political activism, she fought for sexual liberation, contraception, the right to abortion, and the emancipation of women. She was banned from public speaking in 1937 for giving a lecture on birth control in Solothurn.

In September 1948, she published an article in La Révolution prolétarienne, "La littérature russe d’aujourd’hui" ("Russian literature today"), denouncing the servility of Russian writers towards the Stalinist regime. An enemy of conformity and of partisan discipline, she is the author of many works, including Rationalisierung und Hygiene (1932), Sexualfrage und Geburtenregelung (1936), and Rebeverbot in den Kantonen Solothurn und Glarus (1935). In 1952, she went to spend several years in a kibbutz in Tel Aviv and wrote Meine Patientinnen (1953) et Hygiene für Jedermann (1955). She later returned to Zurich, and died in 1967.

== Works ==
- Mikhaïl Bakounine, Confession, introduction de Fritz Brupbacher et des annotations de Max Nettlau, Paris, Rieder, 1932, BnF 31010230.
- Mikhaïl Bakounine, Confession, avant-propos de Boris Souvarine, introduction de Fritz Brupbacher et des annotations de Max Nettlau, Paris, Presses universitaires de France, 1974, BnF 35227824.
- Mikhaïl Bakounine, Confession, préface de Franck L'Huillier, introduction de Fritz Brupbacher et des annotations de Max Nettlau, Paris, L'Harmattan, 2001, BnF 38827348.

== See also ==
- Anarchism in Switzerland
- Anarchism and issues related to love and sex
- History of anarchism
