= Jacques Dicker =

Swiss politician (1879–1942)

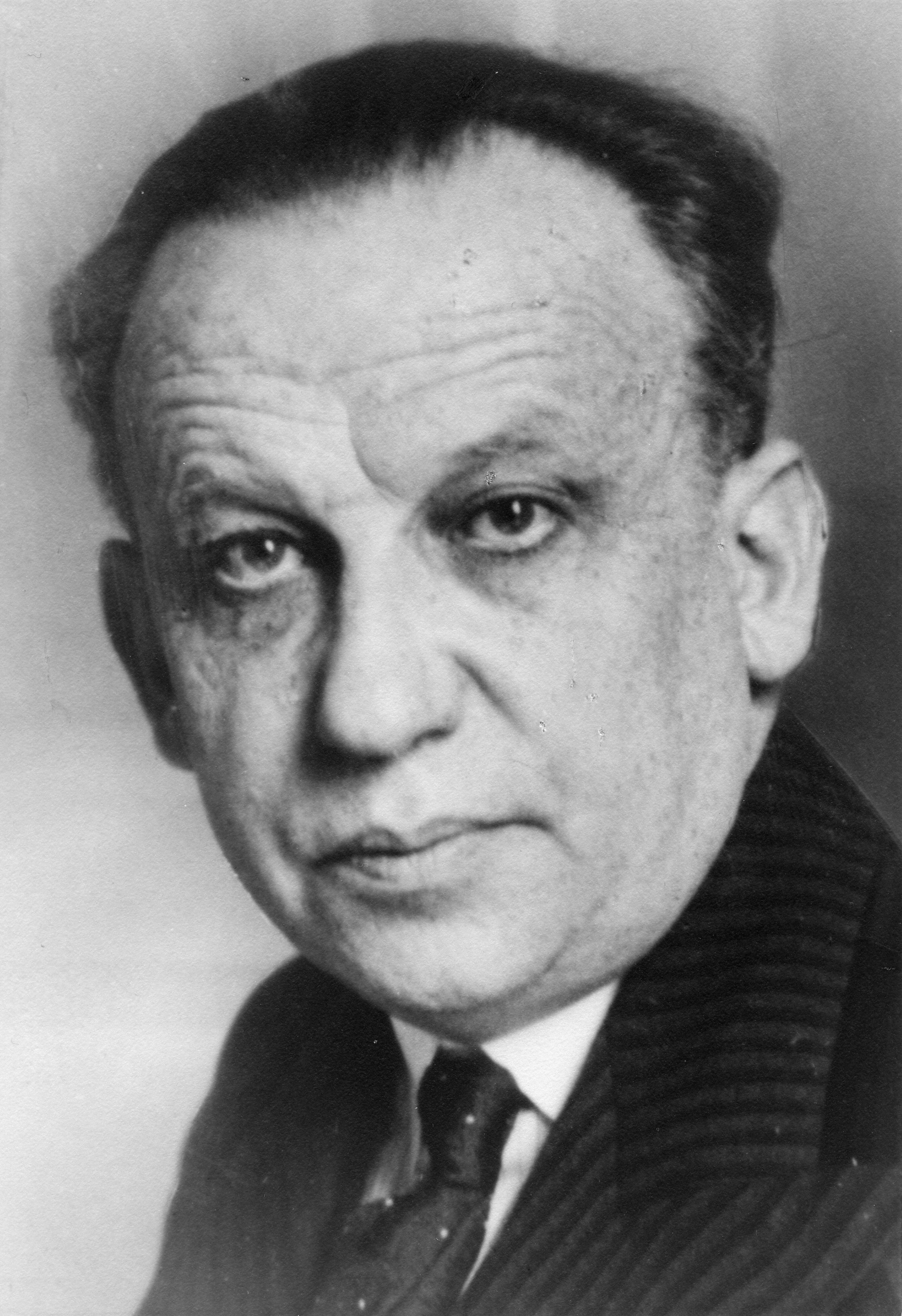
Jacques Dicker

Jacques Dicker (31 July 1879 – 17 November 1942) was a Russian-born Swiss socialist politician and lawyer.

== Biography ==
Dicker was born into a wealthy Jewish family in Khotyn, Bessarabia, the son of Moïse Dicker and Eva Gorodisky. His father worked as an intendent to the Obolensky princes. Dicker took up law studies in Kiev and joined the Socialist-Revolutionary Party as a young man. He was jailed and imprisoned several times due to his political activism. He migrated to Geneva, Switzerland in 1906, fleeing the Czarist repression in the Russian Empire. Dicker continued his law studies in Geneva, obtaining his degree in 1909, and was admitted to the bar in 1915. He would become a prominent penal lawyer.

Dicker became a Swiss citizen in 1915. In Swiss politics, he emerged as a prominent leader of the Swiss Socialist Party in Geneva, of which he was a member since 1906. He collaborated with Léon Nicole at the newspaper Le Travail. Between 1922 and 1925, Dicker represented Geneva in the National Council. After serving in the municipal council of Plainpalais from 1924 and 1929, he returned to the National Council, and would remain a member of that legislature until 1941. Dicker was also a member of the Grand Council of Geneva between 1930 and 1941.

Being a prominent Jewish political leader, Dicker was subjected to violent antisemitic attacks. On 9 November 1932, the far-right National Union convened a meeting in the municipal hall in Plainpalais, a meeting intended to function as a tribunal against Nicole and Dicker. A leftist countermanifestation was organized. Violence broke out between demonstrators and army, killing 13 people and injuring 65.

Dicker defended Nicole in a legal case in May 1933. He was one of four Socialist parliamentarians that sided with the far-left Swiss Socialist Federation when the Socialist Party went through a split in 1939. The Swiss Socialist Federation was banned on 27 May 1941 and Dicker and the other parliamentarians of the party were expelled from the National Council on 11–12 June 1941. He died in Geneva on 17 November 1942, aged 63.
