= Farcidure =

French dish using flour or potato

Farcidure, literally "firm stuffing", is a French dish, variously described as a dumpling or pancake. It is a speciality of Limousin and has many variants. The main carbohydrate was once millet and now may be potato, wheat flour or buckwheat flour. Many recipes include chopped bacon or salted pork. Farcidure may be served as a side dish with a salad, or with meat or poultry stew, or as the main item.

== Variants ==
The dish is most closely associated with the Corrèze part of the Limousin region. There are many varying altitudes, climates, towns and cultures in Corrèze, each with its own farcidure, and to distinguish one from the other almost all of them bear a second name. Argentat's farcidure is called poule sans os (boneless chicken); that from Brive is mique; that from Treignac, mounassou. Others are called farcidure milhassou, picart or chien d' égletons. Only the variant from Tulle is referred to simply as farcidure.

Limousin was one of the first areas of France in which the potato was popular long before Parmentier popularised it throughout the country. Many variants of farcidure from Curnonsky onwards, including those by Michel Guerard and Pierre Koffmann, have grated potato as the base. Larousse Gastronomique stipulates buckwheat flour or wheat flour. Anne Willan writes that the dish can be made with "potatoes, bread dough or even crêpe batter and flavoured with whatever meats or vegetables happen to be available". According to Koffmann the dish is traditionally served with poule au pot, also known as Poularde Henri IV.

== Sources ==
- Koffmann, Pierre (1986). "meat". In Avila, Kay (ed.). Take Twelve Cooks. London: Thames Macdonald. ISBN 0356122875.
- Branget, Françoise, ed. (2015). French Country Cooking: Authentic Recipes from Every Region. Seattle: Arcade Publishing. ISBN 9781611458589.
- Christian, Glynn (1996). Edible France: A Traveller's Guide. London: Grub Street. ISBN 1898697329.
- Courtine, Robert J., ed. (1984). Larousse Gastronomique (in French). Paris: Librarie Larousse. ISBN 2-03-506301-9.
- Curnonsky (1959). Recettes des provinces de France (in French). Paris: Les Productions de Paris. OCLC 1153529366.
- Guérard, Michel (1993). Le sud-ouest gourmand (in French). Paris: A. Michel. OCLC 1345618695.
- Willan, Anne (1981). French Regional Cooking. New York: Morrow. ISBN 0688036708.
