= November 1932 Geneva shooting =

Swiss Army killing of anti-fascist protestors

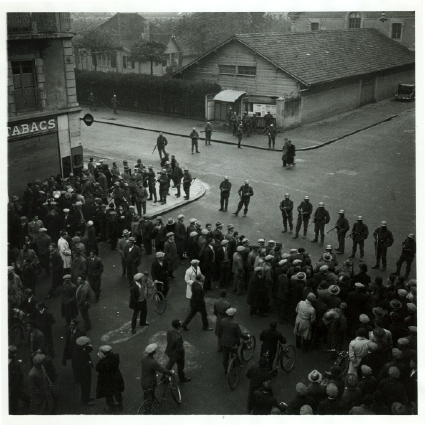
- Civilians and soldiers in Geneva in 1932
- Date: 9 November 1932
- Location: Plainpalais, Geneva, Switzerland; 46°11′38″N 6°08′29″E
- Caused by: Mock trial of socialist leaders being held by the National Union
- Goals: To shut down the meeting of the National Union
- Methods: Demonstrations
- Result: Protestors shot and killed by the Swiss Army, demonstration dispersed

Parties
National Union	Anti-fascists: Socialists; Communists; Anarchists	Federal Council

Lead figures
Georges Oltramare	Léon Nicole; Jacques Dicker; Jean Vincent; Henry Furst †; Lucien Tronchet; André Bösiger	Giuseppe Motta; Frédéric Martin; Ernest Léderrey; Raymond Burnat

Number
	4,000 – 5,000 protestors	241 gendarmes 48 rural guards 62 security agents 610 army recruits 30 army officers

Casualties
- Deaths: 13 (10 immediate, 3 died of wounds)
- Injuries: 65
- Arrested: 41 protestors arrested
- Charged: 7 defendants convicted

On the afternoon of the 9th of November 1932, elements of the Swiss Army under Major Perret fired live rounds into a crowd of anti-fascist protesters in Plainpalais in Geneva, killing 13 and wounding 65.

The shooting occurred on a background of increasing violence between far-right and far-left groups, of rising totalitarian regimes, and of unemployment and economic crisis in Europe. The incident stemmed from inappropriate crowd control tactics, excitation of the antimilitarist protesters after a speech by socialist leader Léon Nicole, a series of incompetent orders, and a force made up of improperly trained officers and soldiers – who had only had six weeks of military training before their deployment. Exactly how events unfolded and who bears responsibility for them are still a matter of debate.

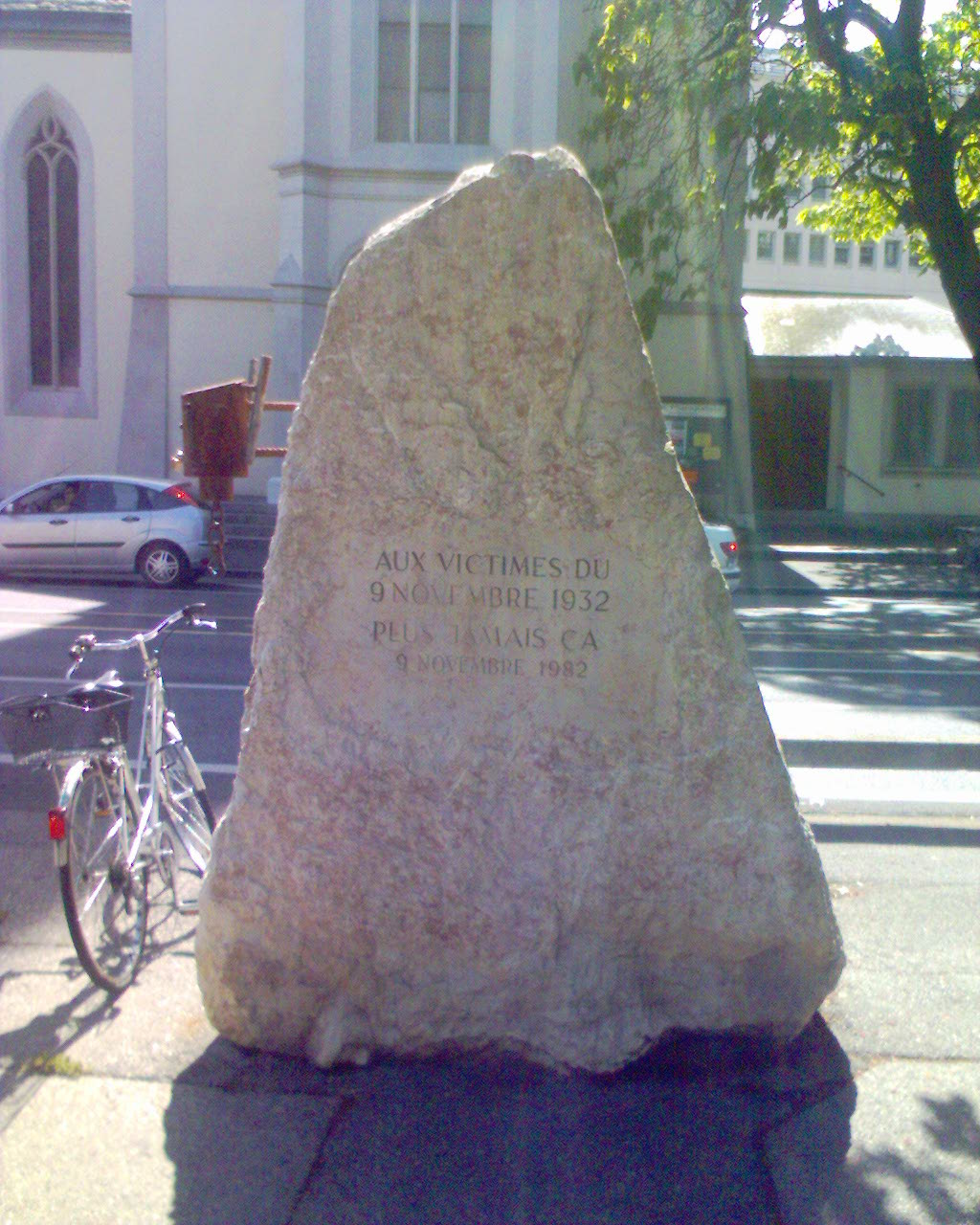
Monument dedicated to the victims of the shooting at Plainpalais, with the expression "Never Again" in French (2007)

A commemorative monument was unveiled on 9 November 1982 for the 50th anniversary of the shooting on the Southern end of Plainpalais, near the place of the events. On 10 September 2008, the State Council of Geneva authorised the monument to be moved in front of the University of Geneva, on the exact spot of the shooting.

== Background ==
The 1930 cantonal elections had given 37 legislative seats of the Grand Conseil to the Socialist Party of Geneva, but none in the executive at the Conseil d'État as the party did not want to be a minority in a right wing government. The political climate significantly deteriorated after a series of scandals such as that of the Bank of Geneva, which bankrupted owners of small portfolios, compromised traditional right-wing parties, and led a Radical council member to resign.

The international context was threatening with the rise of fascism in Europe. In 1922, Benito Mussolini seized power in Italy, followed by Engelbert Dollfuss in Austria in 1932. Meanwhile, the elections of July 31, 1932, foreshadowed Adolf Hitler's rise to power in Germany in 1933. The Union Nationale, whose sole leader from 1935 onward was Georges Oltramare, was the Swiss political movement that most closely aligned itself with the Italian fascist model. A major figure in the Italian Socialist Party, Benito Mussolini was expelled from this party in November 1914 because of his opposition to Italian neutrality. At the end of the First World War, he founded the fascist movement. Under his rule, he persecuted his former socialist comrades, some of whom chose exile in Switzerland. Mussolini personally supported the Swiss fascists Arthur Fonjallaz and Georges Oltramare (aka "Géo").

In December 1930, the writer and journalist Georges Oltramare had founded the Ordre politique national (OPN), a fascist political party, whose virulent anti-Marxist stance seduced a part of the bourgeoisie in Geneva. On 24 June 1932, the OPN merged with the Union de défense économique, a political party of industry owners and entrepreneurs, creating the Union Nationale. The new party promoted gradually a fascistic programme of a strong state, economic corporatism and persecution of Marxists and Jews. It had a paramilitary structure, with fascist-style ceremonies and discipline: its members would wear a uniform (comprising berets and grey shirts) and parade with music. The Party had one member at the Conseil d'État, seating alongside Radicals and Democrats. The Party held rallies attacking Léon Nicole's Socialist Party, Jacques Dicker, and the whole of the worker's Unions and the left-wing parties of Geneva. Street brawls occurred between militants of the Socialist Party and those of the Union nationale.

Left-wing politics were dominated by the Socialist Party, whose leader Nicole and theoretician Dicker favoured an alliance with the Communists. The shooting revealed lines of fracture within the Socialist movement, as well as within the Workers' Unions, with a reformist wing led by Charles Rosselet (president of the federation of workers' unions of the canton of Geneva) and an anarchist wing led by Lucien Tronchet.

Conventional right-wing forces were in danger both of being marginalised by the Union nationale, and of being defeated by the Socialist Party.

== Events ==
=== Fascist mock trial against Nicole and Dicker ===
In the night of 5 to 6 November, a Union nationale pamphlet appeared to advertise a mock trial against Socialist leaders Nicole and Dicker, to be held on 9 November at 8:30 PM in the communal room at Plainpalais. On 6, the Socialist Party requested the meeting to be banned, which the Democratic State councilor in charge of Justice and Police, Frédéric Martin, denied, stating: "right of reunion is a sacred freedom and we will not allow it to be compromised"

On the 7th, the Socialist newspaper Le Travail called for a demonstration: "Fascist scum attempts to roam in Geneva (...) they will find their match; without reserve we call upon the working class of Geneva to fight them. We will fight them with the weapons that they have chosen themselves."

On the same day, an anonymous pamphlet answered: "the infamous Nicoulaz, the Jew Dicker and their mob are preparing for civil war. They are the lackeys of the Soviets. Let us strike them down! Down with the revolutionary scum!"

The next day, the Administrative Council of Geneva announced that the room would be made available. The General Assembly of the Socialist Party decided to organise a counter-protest within the communal hall. Militants equipped with whistles and pepper to cover the sound of the fascist meeting and to blind policemen and the Union national security staff.

=== Army deployment ===
On 9 November at 7 AM, Frédéric Martin recalled General procuror Charles Cornu, who was traveling in Paris, to Geneva. At 11:05, the Conseil d'État, warned by the chief of the Police that there was insufficient personnel available to prevent a riot – 241 gendarmes, 48 rural guards and 62 security agents – decided to deploy the Army. At 11:30, Martin gave a phone call to colonel Kissling, appointed at Bern, who proved reluctant. He finally agreed to task the III/I boot camp of Lausanne, with 610 fresh recruits and about 30 officers under Major Ernest Léderrey with the mission. Recruits were told that "Revolution had broken out in Geneva" and issued live ammunition. Four soldiers who refused to obey were immediately arrested. At 17:30, under the authority of a Federal intervention, the recruits settled in the barracks of Boulevard Carl-Vogt.

=== Protest ===
Late in the afternoon, the first counter-protesters – 4 000 to 5 000 overall – gathered at Plainpalais, some clashing with the gendarmes who, from 5PM, had started to bar people from entering the communal hall without an invitation from the Union nationale. Even though the neighbouring streets were cordoned off from 6:45, a few Socialists, Communists and Anarchists managed to gain access, only to quickly be expelled. Nicole climbed on the shoulders of a militant to address the crowd. At 8:30, the Union nationale meeting started as planned, while outside the hall some of the police cordon started to breach and give way to counter-protestors. At 9:15PM, the 108-man strong first Company moved towards the communal hall upon request from Counselor Martin to reinforce the Gendarmerie cordon. To do so, it had to cross path with the rear of the counter-protesters, who disarmed 18 soldiers, (Note: Protesters seized 10 rifles, 15 bayonets, 1 light machine gun and 2 officer pistols, and either destroyed them or threw them in gutters (À la Recherche de la Vérité, p.39)) called upon them to fraternise with them, and harassed the officers.

At 9:34, the retreating troops found themselves cornered against the facade of the Palais des expositions facing around 150 protestors and opened fire upon orders of First Lieutenant Raymond Burnat, with approval from Major Perret. In addition to rifles, an automatic weapon was also fired into the crowd. Firing lasted for 12 seconds, killing 10 – mostly bystanders, as only three of these victims were left-wing militants – and wounding 65, of whom three later died of their injuries. The crowd then quickly dispersed, while cordons of policemen and soldiers were put in place and equipped with light machine guns. Two trucks of the Public Works Department, equipped with heavy machine guns, were positioned at the entrance of Rue de Carouge and on Boulevard du Pont-d'Arve.

On the 12th, the burial of the victims was attended by thousands of people. One of the victims was Henri Furst, president of the Communist Party of Geneva

== Aftermath ==
=== Responsibilities ===
Right-wing parties and most journalists, notably René Payot (Journal de Genève) and Eugène Fabre (La Suisse), blamed the Socialists leaders for triggering a riot in order to bring down the Government. The left denounced a trap and denied that such brutality was called for : "Conservative journalists, in their true desire to amaze the Bourgeois, their boss, have truly been exaggerating. They feigned to believe that the Revolution had started, that of the Grand Soir (...) but the people of Geneva – whatever their political stance – (...) know the true extent of the events: a scuffle that was repressed in a terrible fashion, mostly due to tactical and psychological errors of the military authorities, which will have to be held accountable"

The correspondent of the Manchester Guardian wrote: "it is not doubtful that in any English town the police would have sufficed to settle such a insignificant affair (...) nothing in these events constituted a riot (...) In my long experience, I have never have known of a case in which the crowd was fired upon with such flimsy reasons. Or more to the point, without any reason whatsoever."

In this memories, published in 1963, State Counselor Albert Picot stated: "One can wonder: facing violence at the 9th of November, could we not have used such political and humane procedure as to, even outside of the boundaries of the law, change the course of events: convoking the leaders of the opposing camps? Actions in agreement with the most reasonable of the Union workers and Udeists? Preventive arrests? I know not. Was the atmosphere created by Nicole, the tension, such that none of this was possible, nor possibly efficient? One cannot redo History with hypotheses."

The official military inquiry, whose purview was strictly the behaviour of the troops, stated on 22 November:

There are no grounds to open a military penal inquiry against Major Lederrey, commanding officer, against Major Perret, against First Lieutenant Burnat, nor against other officers, non-commissioned officers and soldiers who fired their weapons on 9 November. The troops used their weapons within the purview of their mission and only when forced to do so.

The report accuses the protesters of throwing stones on the soldiers and alleges that shots were fired at the soldiers from civilian handguns, notably hitting the helmet of a soldier, and the trigger guard of another. If there were such weapons, they had been removed from the scene.

However, Major Léderrey admitted in his report to the Federal military Department that "recruits, even well trained, are not suited for such tasks, as their officers are usually too young and inexperienced". On 30 September 1996, the Federal Military Library released a report to the press in which it is stated that "military officials, in the heat of the moment, overestimated the seriousness of the events and ordered to open fire." In 1977, Burnat stated that "The honour of the Army was in the balance" and claimed that due warning had been given by bugle, a signal that the crowd did not understand.

This was the last time troops were sent to quell public unrest in Switzerland. Following these events, debates opened as to its role in public policing. The 1934 rejection of the Federal law on public order following a Socialist referendum was strongly determined by the shooting. Furthermore, within the left, the incident split the Parti socialiste suisse, which supported National Defence, from the Geneva section, which opposed it. The incident revived the latent antimilitarism in Geneva, making it of the most critical cantons against the Army for the decades to follow.

=== General strike ===
On 10 November, the board of the federation of Workers' Unions of Geneva (Union des syndicats du canton de Genève, USCG) and the presidents of the various unions affiliated with the Swiss Workers' Union (Union syndicale suisse, USS) met to discuss how to react to the shooting. First the enlarged Central Committee of the Socialist Parti, then the presidents declined the Communist proposal for a general strike. On the same evening, the board of the USS and the next morning the Swiss Commission of Workers Unions, meeting in Lucerne, advised against a general strike for fear of losing control of the situation.

Nevertheless, on 11 November, the 225-member assembly of the USCG decided to launch a fixed-duration general strike (by 85 in favour, 58 against and 60 abstaining) to honour the dead, protest the repression, and oppose fascism as well as the cantonal authorities that they accused of having panicked. The Socialist Party declared a day of mourning.

The strike was declared to 12 November, but was only partially observed as Christian unions and corporations opposed it. At the end of the day, the strike ceased without the slightest incident having occurred.

=== Trial ===
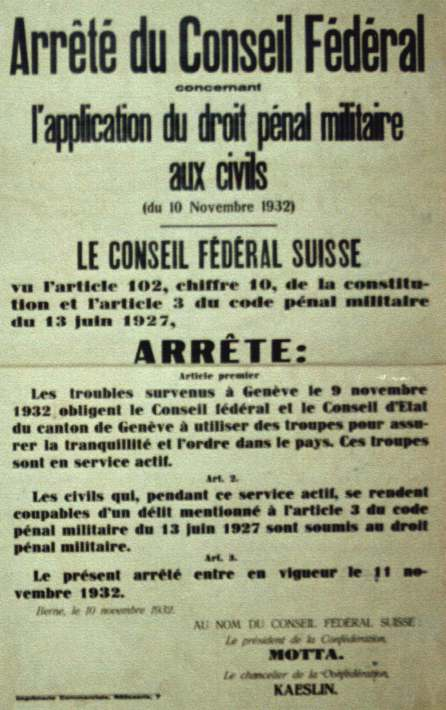
Decree of the Federal Council on applying penal military law to civilians (10 November 1932)

In the morning of 10 November, the State Council banned "any meeting or demonstration on public space" and had a number of public buildings guarded by the regiment of Geneva, under Major Léderrey, reinforced by a battalion from Vallis. Frédéric Martin, Léon Nicole and 39 other left-wing militants were arrested and put in Saint-Antoine prison. Giuseppe Motta, President of the Confederation, spoke of "self defence" in La Tribune de Genève of 11 November. The Federal Council ordered Communists to be excluded from administration: "Anyone having joined the Communist Party of collaborating to any other Communist organisation my neither be recruited nor remain in the Federal services."

Geneva soon followed suit, and furthermore banned the Swiss French-language Communist newspaper, Le Drapeau rouge. During the entire period, the Swiss Socialist Party and the right wing of the Socialist Party of Geneva attempted to avoid confrontation with the government and condemned the actions of the Communists. On 16 November Charles Rosselet stated at the Grand Conseil: "if the events of 9 November did not take more magnitude it is because we were many in the Workers' Unions to do our utmost to avoid them degenerating into further unrest"

Paul Graber, one of the officials of the Swiss Socialist Party, confirmed on 22 November:

the worst danger from the Communists was their call for violence and direct action (...) We just went through days that exposed just where these tactics lead. It starts with verbal excitation, and it ends in mass shooting (...) Calling to violence, to take the streets (...) is the antithesis of our programme.

The trial opened on 15 May 1933 at the central hall of Rue de la Rôtisserie, under Federal judge Agostino Soldati. At the end of a strictly regulated trial, influenced by fear of Nicole's persona and of a rise of left-wing popularity, the Court unanimously convicted 7 of the 18 defendants – Léon Nicole, Auguste Millasson, Francis-Auguste Lebet, Jules Daviet, Albert Wütrich, Francis Baeriswyl and Edmond Isaak – for inciting a riot and sentenced them to up to 4-month imprisonment, except for Nicole who received a 6-month sentence. The ruling triggered intense emotion on the left, which denounced a "class justice", and yielded a significant electoral backlash.

A few months later, legislative Cantonal elections were held on an international background marked by the rise of Hitler to power. Nicole, released on 17 October, returned to leading the Socialist Party of Geneva and conducted the campaign by softening his Marxist overtones as to accommodate Rosselet's moderate wing and attract a centrist electorate disappointed by the rule of the incumbent right-wing government. Faced with a divided right wing with little more to offer than denouncing the "Red menace", the Socialists won by a large margin, winning 45 out of 100 seats, with only 19 to the Radicals and 14 to the Democrats. In spite of Albert Naine's reluctance, the Party proposed four candidates at the executive elections of 26 November and won a historical victory that gained a majority at the State Council and had Léon Nicole, Albert Naine, André Ehrler and Maurice Braillard elected. With Nicole become chief of government on 1 December, Geneva had the first left-wing government in Switzerland.

== Bibliography ==
A more complete bibliography is available on the website of the Communauté genevoise d’action syndicale)

- À la recherche de la vérité, Lausanne (Imprimerie populaire), Fédération suisse des socialistes religieux, 1933, 75 p.
- Frédéric Gonseth, Genève, 9 novembre 1932 : quand l'armée tirait sur la foule, Lausanne, Cedips, 1972, 111 p.
- Claude Torracinta, Genève 1930-1939 : Le temps des passions, Genève, Tribunes éditions, 1978, 225 p.
- Jean Batou, Quand l'esprit de Genève s'embrase. Au-delà de la fusillade du 9 novembre 1932, Lausanne, Éditions d'en bas, 2012, 527 p.

=== In film and radio ===
- « Genève : le temps des passions. Les morts du 9 novembre », documentary film by Claude Torracinta and Bernard Mermod, 60 min., Temps présent, TSR, 24 November 1977.
- « Genève, 9 novembre 1932 », documentary film by Jacqueline Veuve, 1992.
- « Rencontre avec Claude Torracinta », Histoire vivante, Radio suisse romande, 2 November 2007.

== See also ==
- 1918 Swiss general strike
- André Bösiger
- 6 February 1934 crisis
- Battle of Cable Street
