= Noël Fontanet =

Swiss graphic artist and poster designer

- Born: December 24, 1898; Geneva, Switzerland
- Died: March 16, 1982; Geneva, Switzerland
- Citizenship: Italy; Thônex (1918)
- Occupations: Graphic artist, caricaturist, poster designer
- Spouse: Norma Cremona

Noël Fontanet (24 December 1898 – 16 March 1982) was a Swiss graphic artist, caricaturist, and poster designer, best known for his prolific output of advertising and political posters during the interwar period in Geneva.

== Life and career ==
Fontanet was born in Geneva on 24 December 1898, son of Gaudenzio Fontanetto and Maria Cantoia. He was of Italian origin and naturalized in Thônex in 1918. He married Norma Cremona. After an apprenticeship as a sign painter, he attended the Geneva School of Fine Arts from 1914 to 1918, then worked as a decorator at the Grand Théâtre de Genève.

In the 1920s, Fontanet worked in Paris as a graphic designer. On his return to Geneva, he drew caricatures for numerous periodicals, including Le Pilori (1923–1940). He headed the advertising studio of the Société générale d'affichage (c. 1925 – 1953), producing several hundred posters across a wide range of genres. His political work reflects his involvement with the far-right National Union, with a particular affinity for historical subjects. He also worked for several local patriotic societies.

== Bibliography ==
- La Suisse, 18 March 1982.
- Jean-Charles Giroud; Michel Schlup, eds. L'affiche en Suisse romande durant l'entre-deux-guerres. 1994, pp. 95–107.
