= Gauchebdo =

Weekly political magazine in Switzerland

- Categories: Political magazine
- Frequency: Weekly
- Founder: Léon Nicole
- Founded: 1944; 82 years ago
- First issue: August 1944
- Country: Switzerland
- Based in: Geneva
- Language: French
- Website: Gauchebdo
- OCLC: 145149176

Gauchebdo (French pronunciation: [ɡoʃɛbdo], lit. 'Left Weekly') is a Swiss weekly political magazine published in Geneva, Switzerland. Founded in 1944, it is one of the earliest political publications in the country. At the same time it is the last historic title of the Swiss socialist and communist press.

== History and profile ==
The magazine was established by Léon Nicole under the name Voix ouvrière (VO; French: Workers' Voice) in 1944. The first issue appeared in August 1944. The magazine, published on a weekly basis, changed its name several times: VO-Hebdo (1980-1986) and VO Realities (1986-1995). In 1995 it was renamed Gauchebdo. The magazine is the media outlet of Swiss Labor Party.

The headquarters of Gauchebdo is in Geneva. The magazine has a communist stance and covers articles about family allowances, disability insurance, and equality between men and women.

In 2014 the number of subscribers was 2000.
