= Le Travail and Le Droit du Peuple =

Le Travail ("The Work") and Le Droit du Peuple ("The Right of the People") were two French language socialist daily newspapers in Switzerland. Le Travail was founded in 1922 in Geneva (in 1919 as La Voix du Travail). Le Droit du Peuple began publishing in Vaud on 4 May 1917 as a successor of Le Grutléen. It became a daily newspaper on 1 April 1919. In 1925 the two newspapers signed a cooperation treaty, and whilst maintaining separate identities and local pages the two newspapers would share national and international articles. After the association of the two newspapers, Léon Nicole served as their editor. Politically Nicole had a hegemonic influence over the newspapers.

From 1925 onwards the two newspapers were published by the Socialist Press Union of the Cantons of Geneva and Vaud and they were printed by Imprimeries Populaires. From 1936 both papers were printed in Geneva. As Le Peuple Valaisan disappeared in 1936, Le Droit du Peuple became the de facto socialist organ in Bas-Valais as well.

When the Swiss Socialist Party split in 1939, Le Travail and Le Droit du Peuple became organs of the Swiss Socialist Federation. But the enemies of Nicole were in control of the Imprimeries Populaires printing press and refused to print Le Travail and Le Droit du People. Instead the newspapers had to seek cooperation with small private printing presses in order to continue publication. The 22 sections of the Socialist Party of Geneva set up a cooperative in October 1939, for the sake of purchasing printing equipment. In early 1940 a building, to be used for the printing press, was purchased.

Both Le Travail and Le Droit du Peuple were banned on 5 July 1940.
