= Swiss Socialist Federation =

The Swiss Socialist Federation (French: Fédération socialiste suisse, abbreviated FSS) was a political party in Switzerland.

== Founding ==
The FSS emerged from a split in the Swiss Socialist Party in 1939. On September 16, 1939, the Swiss Socialist Party expelled Léon Nicole and the party branches loyal to him, citing Nicole's defense of the Molotov–Ribbentrop Pact. The majority of the Socialist Party members in Geneva sided with Nicole. In Vaud the Socialist Party was also divided, as the majority led by Jeanneret-Minkine sided with Nicole. In October 1939 Nicole began building a new inter-cantonal organization, mobilizing the organizations supporting him.

The FSS was founded at a meeting at the Maison du Peuple in Renens on December 3, 1939. Léon Nicole was elected chairman of FSS. An executive committee, with eight members, was also elected. Other committee members included Eugène Masson, Ernest Gloor, Maurice Jeanneret and Albert Karlen. FSS had two press organs, Le Travail and Le Droit du Peuple.

== Profile ==
The programme of FSS was almost identical to that of the Swiss Socialist Party. The only key differences between the parties were their views on the international situation, the war and the Soviet Union. As implied by its name, FSS had a federal structure in which the affiliated organizations remained autonomous. The underground Communist Party of Switzerland began working within the FSS.

== Ban ==
On July 5, 1940, Le Travail and Le Droit du Peuple were banned by the Swiss government. The government also wished to ban the FSS as such, but found it legally complicated as the party had four members of parliament (Léon Nicole, Jacques Dicker, Ernest Gloor and Eugène Masson). However the Vitznau Commission came up with a compromise solution. At its meeting on April 28, 1941, it decided to equate the activities of the FSS with those of the banned Communist Party, thus paving the way for a ban on the FSS. The FSS was banned on May 27, 1941. Later, its parliamentarians were expelled from the National Council. The Swiss Socialist Party actively supported the banning of the FSS. The FSS continued to exist as an underground movement, though. It supported electoral candidatures of politicians wanting to repeal the ban on the party (such as Florian Delhorbe in Vaud in July 1942 and Professor William Rappard in Geneva in September 1941), and sought an alliance with the German-speaking Landesring of Gottlieb Duttweiler. In the 1943 parliamentary election, the FSS called for a boycott.

== New party ==
After the dissolution of the Communist International in 1943, a unification process between the FSS and the Communist Party was initiated (within a 'Browderist' framework). There was a hope that the Socialist Party would join the merger, but this proposal was rejected at by the Socialist Party. The FSS and the Communist Party dissolved themselves. In 1944, the Swiss Party of Labour was founded, substituting the FSS and the Communist Party.
