= Le Grutléen =

- Type: Weekly newspaper
- Editor: Paul Golay
- Founded: 15 October 1909; 116 years ago
- Ceased publication: 1917
- Political alignment: Socialist
- Language: French
- Headquarters: Lausanne
- Country: Switzerland

Le Grutléen was a Swiss socialist weekly newspaper published in the French language in Lausanne, and linked to the Socialist Party of Vaud.

It was founded on 15 October 1909 under the influence of Paul Golay and Chaux-de-Fonnier Charles Naine, with Golay serving as editor.

On 1 May 1917, the Grütli Society broke away from the Swiss Socialist Party. As a result, the newspaper was replaced by Le Droit du Peuple (transl. The Right of the People).
