= Robert Courtine =

French food writer (1910–1998)

Robert Julien Courtine (16 May 1910 – 14 April 1998) was a French food writer who also wrote under the pen names "La Reynière" and "Savarin".

== Background ==
Courtine was a member of the far-right Action française during the 1930s, and was close to the anti-semitic journalist Henry Coston. During the German Occupation, he was an active participant in the collaborationist newspapers La France au travail and L'Appel. He left Paris in August 1944 for the Sigmaringen enclave. He was arrested in 1946 and sentenced to ten years at hard labor. The sentence was commuted in 1948, on condition that he not speak on the radio.

In 1952, Courtine joined Le Monde where, using the pen name "La Reynière" (inspired by Grimod de La Reynière), he wrote the gastronomy column until 1993. As "La Reynière" he was a notable opponent of nouvelle cuisine and supporter of traditional French cookery, including French regional cuisine.

Courtine has written many books on gastronomy. The Hundred Glories of French Cooking, translated by Derek Coltman and published in North America by Doubleday in 1973, has been described as a "culinary art gallery" with recipes from throughout France, and "simplicity is their common thread—choice ingredients carefully prepared in the simplest manner, not over-garnished or over-rich."

== Publications ==
- Drôle de macchabée, préface de Paul Reboux, A. Fleury, 1952
- L'assassin est à votre table, Éditions de la Pensée moderne, 1956; réédition, avec une préface d'Albert Simonin, la Table ronde, 1969
- Un gourmand à Paris, B. Grasset, 1959
- Un nouveau savoir manger, B. Grasset, 1960
- Tous les cocktails (signé Savarin), Gérard et Cie,1960
- Les Dimanches de la cuisine, la Table ronde, 1962
- La Cuisine du monde entier (signé Savarin), Gérard et Cie, 1963
- 450 recettes originales à base de fruits, Éditions de la Pensée moderne, 1963
- La Vraie cuisine française (signé Savarin), Gérard et Cie, 1963
- Célébration de l'asperge, R. Morel, 1965
- Toutes les boissons et les recettes au vin, Larousse, 1968
- La Gastronomie, Presses universitaires de France, 1970
- Cent Merveilles de la cuisine française, 1971
- Le Guide de la cuisine française et internationale, Elvesier-Séquoia, 1972
- Dictionnaire des fromages, Larousse, 1972
- Le Cahier de recettes de madame Maigret (présenté par La Reynière), préface de Georges Simenon, Robert Laffont, 1974
- Balzac à table, Robert Laffont, 1976
- La Cuisine française : classique et nouvelle (signé La Reynière), dessins de Claudine Volckerick, Marabout, 1977
- Mon bouquet de recettes, Marabout, 1977
- Zola à table, Robert Laffont, 1978
- Guide de la France gourmande, P. Bordas, 1980
- Toute la cuisine française et étrangère, Publimonde, 1982
- Dictionnaire de cuisine et de gastronomie (sous la dir. de R. J. Courtine), Larousse, 1986
- Les Fromages, Larousse, 1987
- Le Guide de la cuisine des terroirs (cinq volumes), La Manufacture, 1992

== Bibliography ==
- Pierre-André Taguieff, L'antisémitisme de plume 1940-1944, Berg éditeurs, 1999
- Henry Coston, Dictionnaire de la politique française, Publications Henry Coston, 2000
