= Lucien Tronchet =

Swiss anarcho-syndicalist (1902–1982)

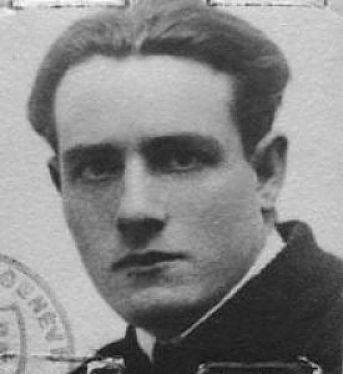
- Tronchet c. 1925
- Born: 4 October 1902; Lyon, France
- Died: 24 February 1982 (aged 79); Geneva, Switzerland
- Years active: 1920–1940
- Organization: International Federation of Trade Unions
- Known for: Anarcho-syndicalism, anti-militarism, anti-fascism

Lucien Tronchet (1902–1982) was a Swiss anarcho-syndicalist activist. An emblematic figure of trade unionism in Geneva, he took action alongside Italian anti-fascist refugees and Spanish libertarians during the Spanish Civil War. A convinced antimilitarist, he spent two times, in 1920 and 1940, in prison for "refusing to serve" in the Swiss Army.

== Biography ==
He began to work at a very young age as an apprentice baker in Grenchen (Solothurn), before working in the building industry in Geneva.

=== Revolutionary syndicalist ===
In 1922, a conscientious objector, he was sentenced to 20 days in detention. It was at this time that he became friends with Luigi Bertoni, one of the major figures of the libertarian movement in Switzerland, who published Le Réveil anarchiste, in Geneva, from 1900 to 1946.

The same year, he founded, with five members of the group of the newspaper Le Réveil anarchiste, the "Autonomous Syndicate of Masons and Maneuvers" before joining the Federation of Wood and Building Workers (FOBB, member of the Union Syndicale Suisse), while remaining a member of the autonomous union.

On May 19, 1928 a wildcat strike broke out in the building sector. Led by Tronchet and Clovis-Abel Pignat, it lasted 15 days, and the bosses gave in to the demands of the reduction of working time, the minimum wage, etc.

In the 1930s, he was one of the leaders of the Building Action League, practicing direct action against the bosses.

=== Antifascist and antimilitarist ===
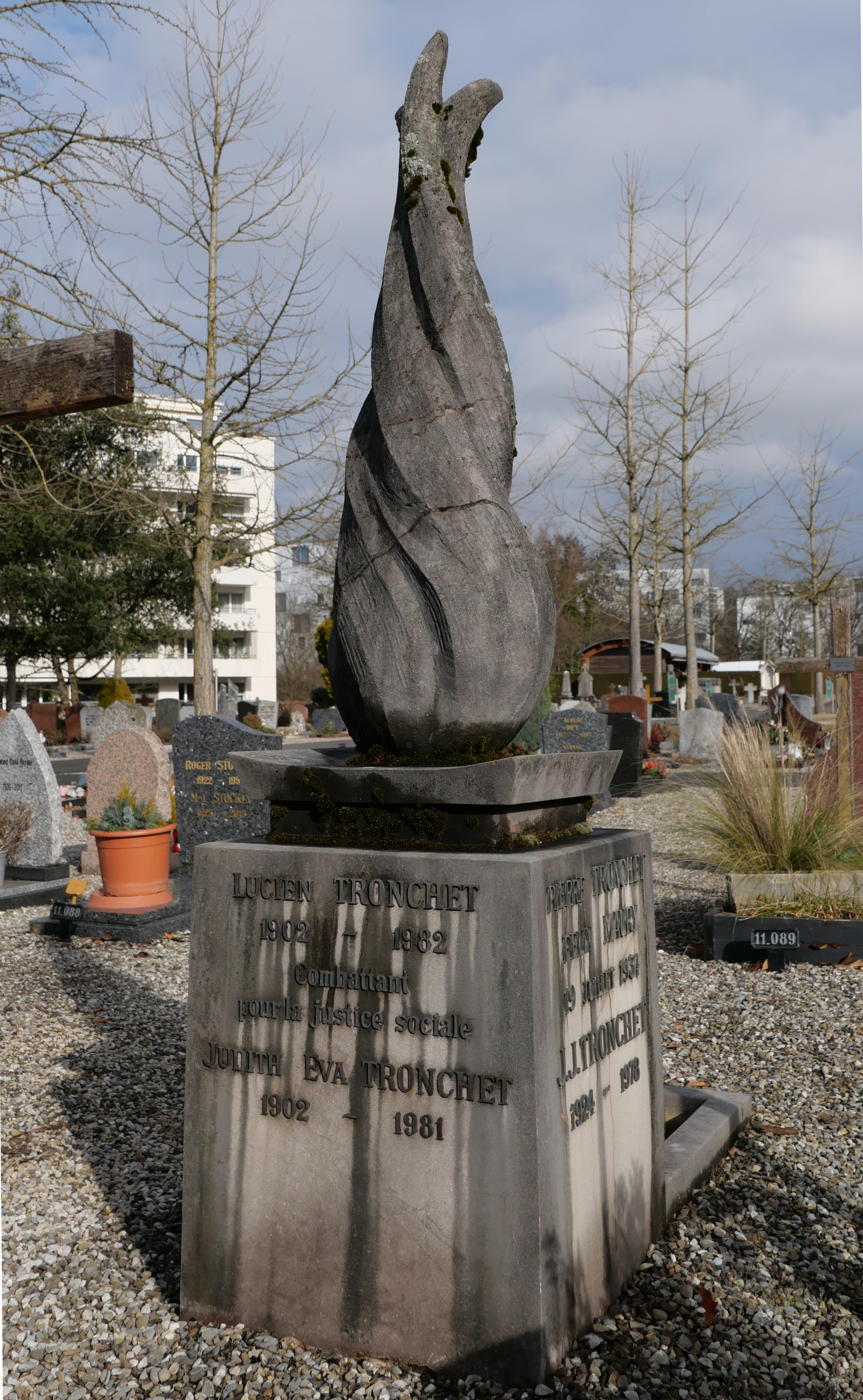
The family grave of Tronchet at the cemetery of Carouge. The epitaph reads: Combattant pour la justice sociale

During the 1920s, he supported the Italian anti-fascist resistance with the help of his comrade Clovis-Abel Pignat, whose biography he wrote a few years later.

During the Geneva fusillade of 9 November 1932, the army fired on an anti-fascist demonstration, leaving 13 dead and 65 wounded. Pierre Tronchet, the brother of Lucien, was injured. Wanted for organizing this unauthorized demonstration, he fled to Paris with his brother, whom he released from the hospital with a comrade. Their trial took place on May 15, 1933: the two brothers, returned to Switzerland, presented themselves freely at the hearing. The trial ended with a dismissal.

On March 6, 1940, during the mobilization, he was again condemned as a "conscientious objector" to 8 months in prison and 5 years of deprivation of civil rights, and to three months more for a leaflet accusing the judges of bias and of common interests with employers. Released from prison on February 19, 1941, he gradually moved away from the anarchist movement, taking over the reins of the Geneva FOBB, organizing strikes and construction sites to avoid the militarization of the unemployed.

=== Spanish revolution ===
In August 1936, during the Spanish Revolution of 1936, he supported the libertarians of the National Confederation of Labor (CNT) by disseminating information but also by action by founding the “Adelante” group which sent arms, money and supplies to Spanish anarcho-syndicalists.

In October 1936, he went to Spain himself with Luigi Bertoni.

In 1937, he contributed to the creation of the Iberian Office for Economic Expansion (OIDEE), which linked agricultural collectives in Spain with consumer cooperatives in Switzerland. He was also commissioned by the International Federation of Trade Unions to supply machine tools to Republican Spain.

After the war, he continued his work as a trade union activist, also fought for the right to abortion, anti-militarism, the creation of cooperatives, etc. In 1978, he supported the Geneva squatters movement.

In 1978, he founded in Geneva, the College of Work, “Foundation for the memory and the history of the world of work”.

== Publications ==
- With Luigi Bertoni, Face à la guerre... devant le tribunal militaire de la Première Division, à Lausanne, le 16 mars 1940, Éditions Germinal, Geneva, 1940.
- Un homme dans la Mêlée sociale. Louis Bertoni, pour son 70e anniversaire, Geneva 1942.
- 1922–1942, 20e anniversaire de l’union FOBB, les batailles syndicalistes des bâtisseurs à Genève, Geneva 1943.
- Cent ans de lutte des gars du bâtiment à Genève suivi de La semaine de cinq jours, Geneva 1948.
- Les actions héroïques des gars du bâtiment, FOBB, Geneva 1954.
- Clovis Pignat, une vocation syndicale internationale, Lausanne, Éditions du Grand-Pont, 1971, BnF 34811297h.
- Combats pour la dignité ouvrière, Geneva, Grounauer, 1979.

== Bibliography and sources ==
=== Articles ===
- Elsig Riederalp, Alexandre (2009). La Ligue d'action du bâtiment (1929-vers 1935), L'éphémère emprise de l'anarcho-syndicalisme sur les chantiers genevois (PDF) (Master's) (in French). University of Fribourg., Genève, Éditions d’en bas, Collège du travail, 2015.
  - Barenboim, Axel (April 2017). "La Ligue d'action du bâtiment (1929-vers 1935), L'éphémère emprise de l'anarcho-syndicalisme sur les chantiers genevois". Le Mouvement social (in French). No. 261.
  - Jeanneret, Pierre (8 July 2015). "Quand les "gars du bâtiment" prenaient la rue" (in French). Gauchebdo.
- Berenstein-Wavre, Jacqueline; De Giorgi, Alda (1998). "Lucien Tronchet, syndicaliste de choc" (PDF) (in French). Geneva: Collège du travail.
- Elsig, Alexandre (2010). "L'action directe en correctionnelle : la Ligue d'action du bâtiment et l'affaire de Versoix (1931)". Cahiers d'histoire du mouvement ouvrier. 26: 49–62.
- Enckell, Marianne (July 1982). "Lucien Tronchet est mort". Le Monde libertaire (in French).

=== Archives ===
- Centre International de Recherches sur l'Anarchisme (Lausanne) : notice bibliographique.
- Collège du travail, Fondation pour la mémoire et l'histoire du monde du travail, Genève : Lucien Tronchet.

=== Radio ===
- Jacques Bofford, Lucien Tronchet, En questions, Radio télévision suisse, 28 janvier 1980, écouter en ligne.
- Lison Méric, 9 novembre 1932, Je me souviens, Radio télévision suisse, 9 août 2006, écouter en ligne.
