= Fritz Brupbacher =

Swiss physician and writer (1874–1945)

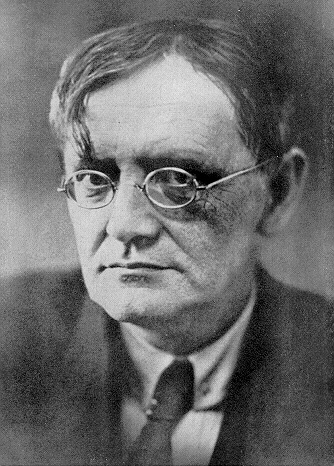
- Born: 30 June 1874; Zürich, Switzerland
- Died: 1 January 1945 (aged 70); Zürich, Switzerland
- Resting place: Hönggerberg cemetery
- Education: University of Zurich
- Occupation: Physician
- Years active: 1900–1943
- Political party: SDP (1900–1921); KP (1921–1933)

Fritz Brupbacher (30 June 1874 – 1 January 1945) was a Swiss medical doctor, libertarian socialist and writer.

== Biography ==
In addition to his medical work, he devoted himself to the propaganda of a libertarian socialism in the working class. He founded reading circles like Schwänli, gave lectures and published the agitation magazine Junge Schweiz from 1899 to 1900. From 1900 to 1904 Brupbacher was a member of the Social Democratic Party of Switzerland in the Zürich City Council. In 1905, he and his wife visited the Russian anarchist Peter Kropotkin on the island of Jersey, from whose book Mutual Aid he was very impressed. There he met James Guillaume and became enthusiastic about French revolutionary syndicalism. In the same year he founded the Zürich Antimilitarist League. In 1907 he took up Vera Figner when she came to the West after 22 years in the Tsar's prison. In 1911 he traveled to Russia twice to visit his wife, who suffered from famine and was arrested by the Okhrana and exiled in Mesen. Their partnership failed in 1916 because of differing views on the decisive force for the revolutionary process in Europe. While Petrovna saw it in the Russian peasantry, Brupbacher held fast to internationalism.

With his friend Max Tobler, Brupbacher was editor of the monthly Polis from 1906 to 1908. He has also contributed to Volksrecht, the Outpost, Free Youth, The Revolutionary, The Fighter, La Vie Ouvrière and other French syndicalist newspapers. From 1908 to 1911 he trained workers in lecturer courses. After the Zürich general strike of 1912, Robert Grimm declared to the party: "But now out with Brupbacher". The attempt to expel him from the Social Democratic Party in 1914 because of his anarchist sympathies was suspended because of the strong resistance of his friends. In 1921 he left the party himself to join the newly founded Swiss Communist Party. In the same year he and Willi Munzenberg accompanied a food transport of the International Workers Aid (IAH) to the hungry areas of the RSFSR. In 1933 Brupbacher, who criticized Stalin for his fight against Trotsky, was expelled from the Communist Party for "completely anti-Marxist anarchist attitudes".

In 1922 Fritz Brupbacher met the Russian doctor Paulette Gutzeit-Raygrodski, who became his second wife. Together they ran the practice in Zürich-Aussersihl for twenty years. Like her husband, Paulette Brupbacher did pioneering work in the field of sex education. She appeared at events organized by Fritz Brupbacher, who was responsible for the Communist Party's educational work. She took a stand in favor of abortion for medical, economic and social reasons, demanded child benefits, crèches, maternity leave and the funding of contraceptives by the health insurance company. After a lecture in 1936, the government council of the canton of Solothurn imposed a ban on public speaking, which was finally upheld by the federal court after an objection. The doctor summarized her experiences in 1953 in the book My Patients.

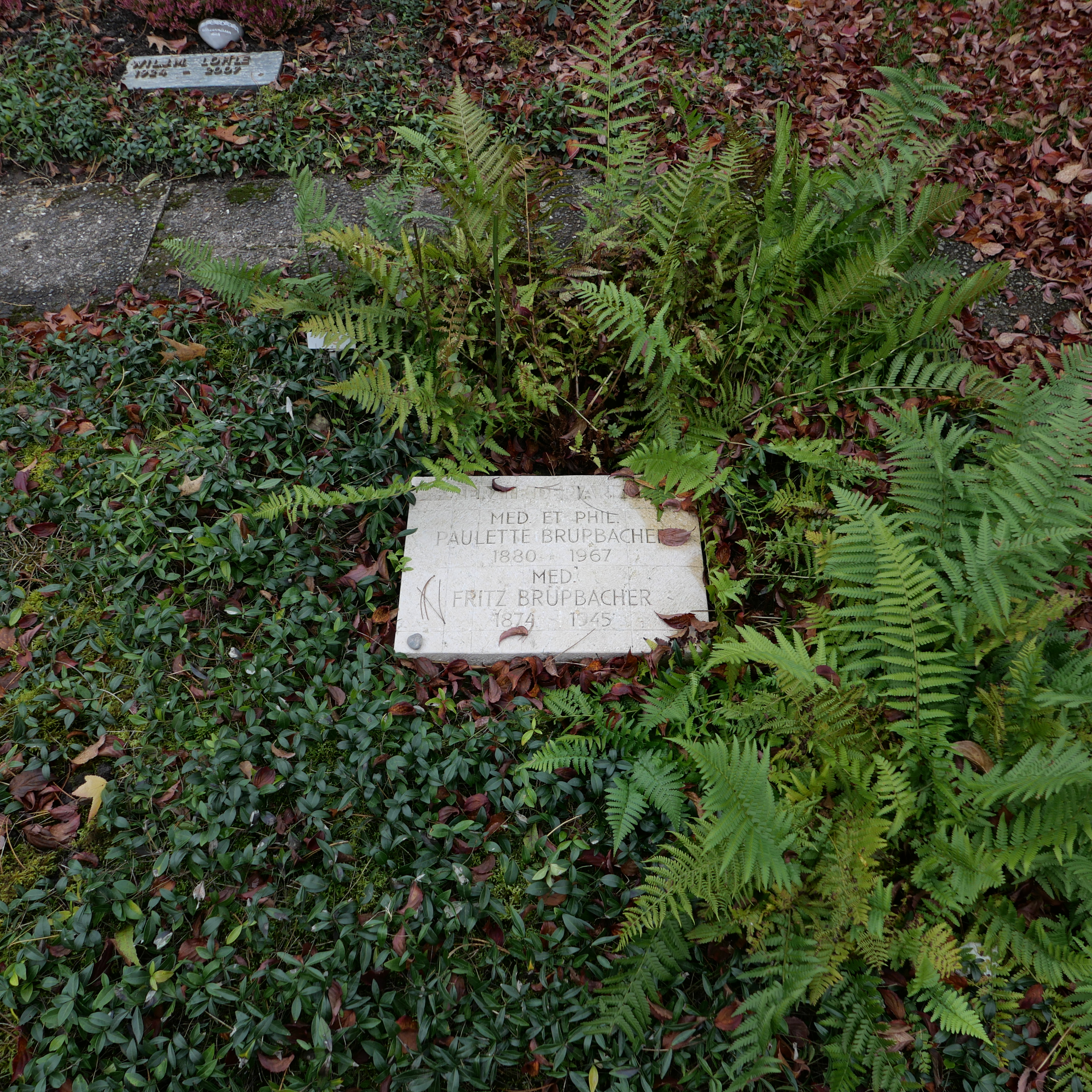
The grave of Fritz and Paulette Brupbacher at the cemetery of Hönggerberg in Zürich. The tombstone bears the inscription: "AERZTE DER ARMEN" ("Doctors of the poor")

== Honors ==
There is a memorial for Fritz and Paulette Brupbacher at the Hönggerberg cemetery. In today's Zürich city district 3, to which the former workers' quarter Aussersihl belongs, a square was named "Brupbacherplatz" in 2009, with one half of the square being dedicated to Fritz Brupbacher and the other to Paulette Brupbacher-Raygrodski.
