= RHINO (squat) =

Former self-managed Swiss cultural project

Coordinates: 46°11′46.35″N 6°8′57.91″E

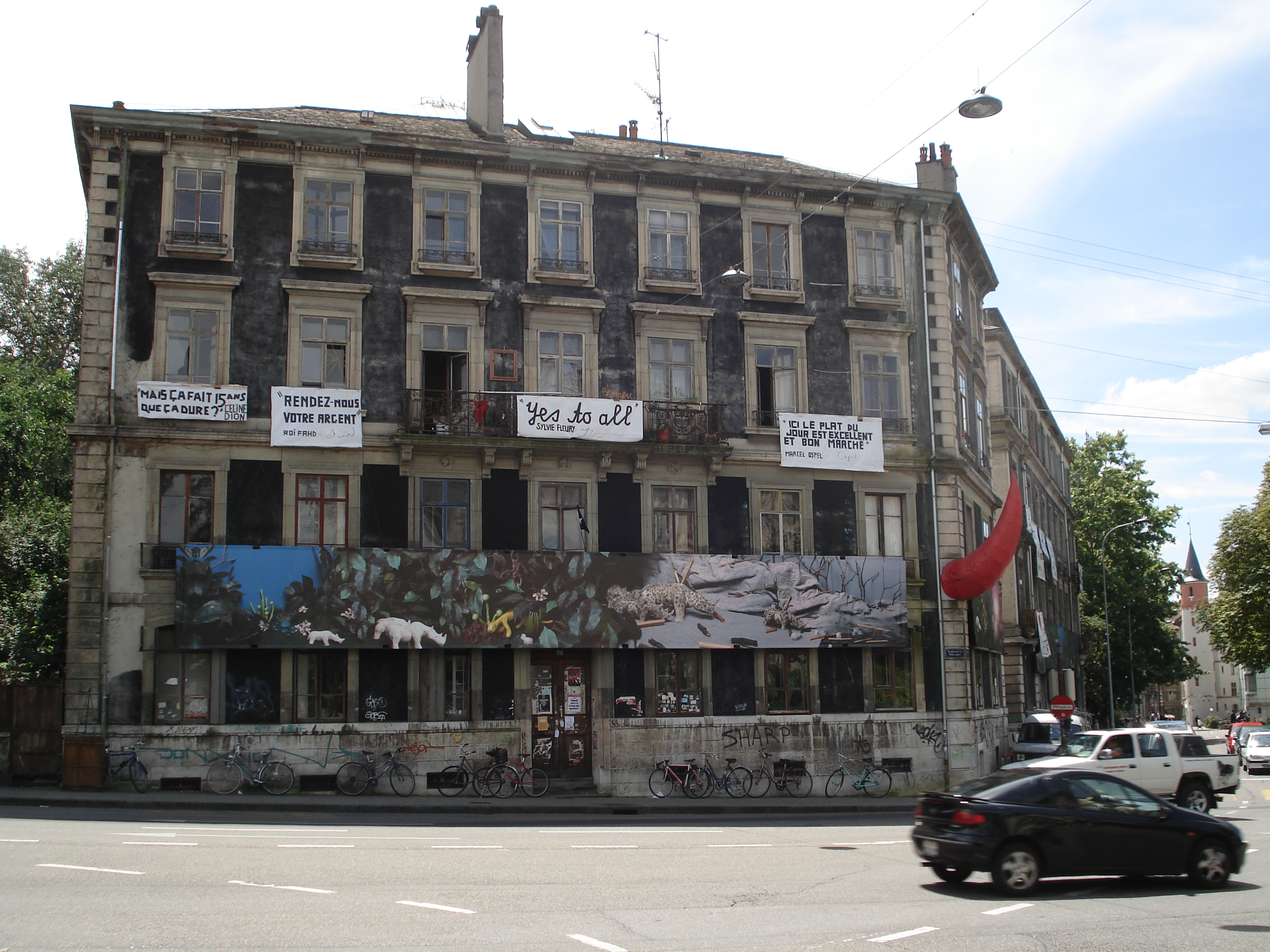
RHINO building with the red horn

RHINO was a squat in Geneva, Switzerland. It occupied two buildings on the Boulevard des Philosophes in downtown Geneva, a few blocks away from the main campus of the University of Geneva. RHINO housed seventy people until its eviction in July 2007. It had been occupied by the squatters since 1988.

== Activities ==
The RHINO project (which stands for "Retour des Habitants dans les Immeubles Non-Occupés", or 'Return of inhabitants to non-occupied buildings') also operated an independent cinema in its basement, the Cave 12, as well as a bar, restaurant and concert space on the ground floor called Bistro'K.

The two buildings' facades were often decorated with protest art, usually promulgating leftist political messages or generally the right to occupy the buildings. The buildings were instantly recognizable by the large papier-maché red horn installed on the wall.

In 2001, the Mayor of Geneva visited the squat with Bertrand Delanoë (Mayor of Paris) to show him Geneva's alternative culture.

== Association ==
The squatters set up an association to represent themselves. Each individual paid 100 CHF every month to the communal fund, which among other things paid for lawyers.

== Eviction ==
The RHINO organisation often faced legal troubles, and in 2007 it was dissolved by the Swiss Federal Tribunal because of its "illegal aims."

Geneva police then evicted the inhabitants on July 23, 2007. There were 19 arrests and water cannon was used to quell the riots.

The RHINO eviction was a large chunk of the city's plan to evict all the squats. Chief prosecutor Daniel Zappelli, who at that time was dealing with at least 27 criminal procedures concerning squatting in Geneva, commented "There comes a time when state authority should be affirmed and restored."

== European Court of Human Rights ==
RHINO appealed the decision to dissolve its organisation and in 2011 won its case at the European Court of Human Rights. The judgement asserted that the eviction violated the article 11 (Freedom of association) rights of the squatters and ordered compensation of 65,651 Euros in respect of pecuniary damage and 21,949 Euros for costs and expenses.
