= Marco Camenisch =

Swiss anarchist and environmental activist

Marco Camenisch (born 21 January 1952) is a Swiss anarchist and environmental activist.

== Biography ==
=== Early life ===
Camenisch was born on 21 January 1952, in Campocologno, Switzerland and raised in a middle-class home in canton Graubünden.

=== Activism ===
In the late 1970s, Camenisch was involved in local opposition to the nuclear power industry. In Switzerland, as in other countries, the movement against nuclear power plants utilized tactics of direct action: cutting down electrical pylons, sabotage against power stations, and actions against leaders of the nuclear industry.

On Christmas eve of 1979, Camenisch with René Moser sabotaged a power station belonging to NOK (Nordostschweizer Kraftwerke) at Bad Ragaz, St. Gallen with explosives, destroying two transformers and a power pole. The pair were arrested for the sabotage in January 1980 and after spending a year free on bail, the court of Canton in Chur and Graubünden sentenced Camenisch to 10 years in prison.

=== Escape ===
In December 1981, he escaped from Regensdorf prison near Zürich, along with 5 other prisoners. During the melée a prison guard was shot and killed, and another was seriously injured. Camenisch claimed he hadn't been part of the group which committed the shootings. After the escape he spent 10 years in hiding.

In 1989, Swiss federal police and media claimed he was responsible for the killing of Swiss border police officer Kurt Moser at Brusio.

=== Arrest in Italy ===
On 5 November 1991, Camenisch was stopped by Carabinieri on Cinquale di Montignoso road, along with fellow anarchist Giancarlo Sergianpietri. Camenisch produced a handgun and opened fire, wounding one of the soldiers. In the ensuing shootout, he was wounded in one leg and arrested. Two guns and six rudimentary bombs were found at his place. He was taken to Pisa hospital, where he remained for six months, and later at San Vittore prison infirmary in Milan. The Italian Court of Massa Carrara sentenced him to 12 years for assault and sabotage of electrical pylons. He served 9 of those years while in solitary confinement in a maximum-security prison.

=== Extradition to Switzerland ===
In April 2002, Camenisch was extradited to Switzerland and transferred to a prison in Pfäffikon near Zürich. In January 2003, after a hunger strike against the conditions of imprisonment he was suffering, he was transferred to a prison in Chur with better conditions. In 2002 the Swiss government transferred him back to Pfäffikon. In July 2004 he was sentenced to seventeen years in prison for the murder of Kurt Moser.

In November 2006 the Federal Supreme Court nullified this sentence on the basis that the sum of the two prison terms would exceed the maximum of twenty years set by Swiss law. On 13 March the sentence was therefore reduced to eight years.

Camenisch has maintained his political beliefs during his time in prison, and he has remained a political activist.

He was freed from prison on 10 March 2017, after 26 years.

== See also ==
- Ecoterrorism
