= La France au travail =

French propaganda newspaper in WW II

La France au Travail (France at Work) was a pro-German French newspaper which appeared from 30 June 1940 onwards funded by the German embassy in France. It was started as a propaganda initiative in the aftermath of the German occupation to influence left-leaning segments of French public opinion. The director, Jean Drault, was a French antisemite while its editor, Georges Oltramare, was a pro-Nazi Swiss journalist who broadcast on French radio. The extent of German control is evident in that editorial meetings were held directly in the German embassy on the rue de Lille. In style and content, the newspaper mirrored the Communist newspaper L'Humanité except for virulent antisemitic and anti-Masonic positions. The newspaper was fairly successful with sales of 92,000 in the first weeks rising to 180,000 by August 1940. Exposure by the clandestine Communist press as well as mainstream French newspapers, however, ensured a steady, and then permanent, decline.
