= Jean Wintsch =

French doctor, anarchist, and neo-Malthusian

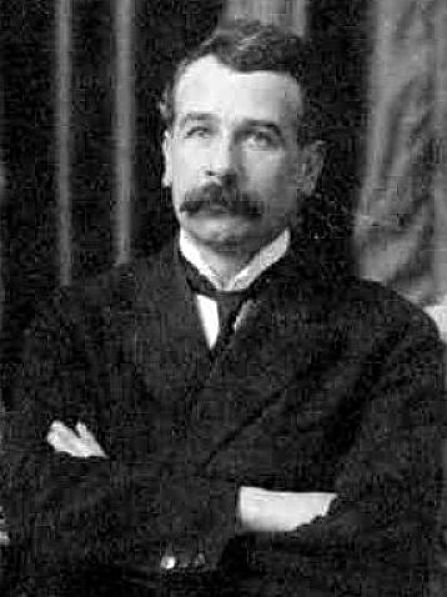
- Born: January 19, 1880; Odessa, Russia
- Died: April 27, 1943 (aged 63); Lausanne, Switzerland
- Occupation: Doctor
- Known for: Lausanne Ferrer School

Jean Wintsch (1880–1943) was a medical doctor, anarchist, and neo-Malthusian who founded the Lausanne Ferrer School.

== Bibliography ==
- Bottinelli, Gianpiero; Enckell, Marianne (October 25, 2016). "WINTSCH Jean". Dictionnaire des anarchistes (in French). Paris: Maitron/Editions de l'Atelier.
- Grunder, Hans-Ulrich (November 17, 2015). "Wintsch, Jean". Historisches Lexikon der Schweiz HLS (in German).
- Jean Batou, Mauro Cerutti, Charles Heimberg, Pour une histoire des gens sans histoire : ouvriers, exclus et rebelles en Suisse, 19e-20e siècles, Éditions d'en bas, 1995.
- Claude Cantini, Charles Heimberg, Pour une histoire sociale et antifasciste : contributions d'un autodidacte, Éditions d'en bas, 1999.
