= Confession (Bakunin) =

1851 autobiographical work by Mikhail Bakunin for Russian Tsar Nicholas I

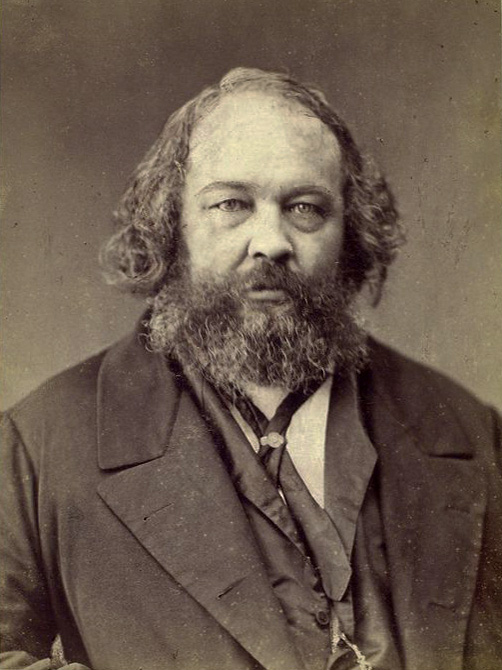
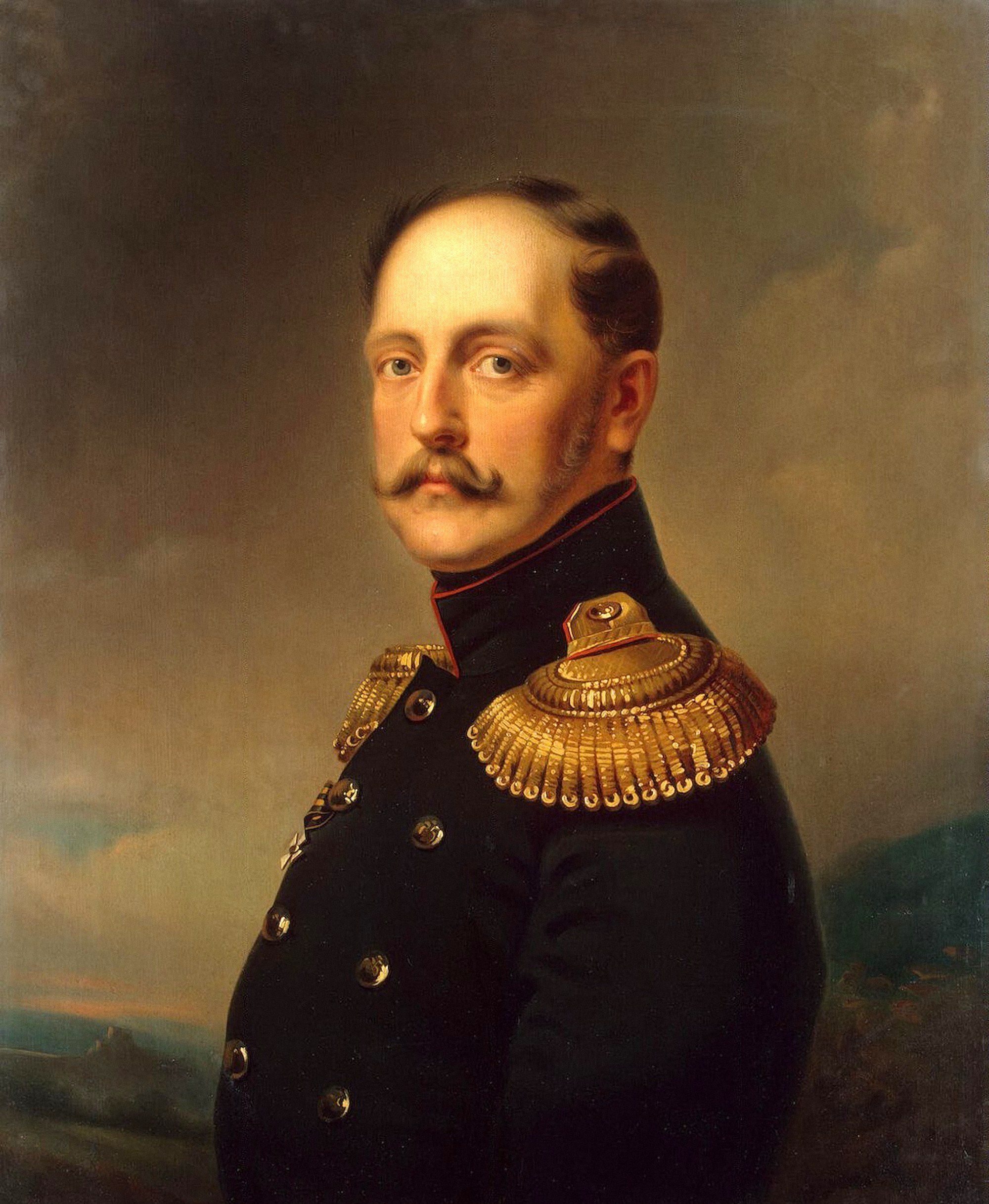
Bakunin and Nicholas I

Mikhail Bakunin's Confession is an 1851 autobiographical work written by the imprisoned anarchist for clemency from Russian Emperor Nicholas I.

== Background and contents ==
Mikhail Bakunin (1814–1876) was the leading anarchist revolutionary of the 19th century, active from the 1840s through the 1870s. In the 1840s, he moved from philosophical studies to revolutionary agitation. After participating in the 1848 Prague and 1849 Dresden uprisings, he was imprisoned, tried, sentenced to death, and extradited multiple times. Placed in solitary confinement in the Peter and Paul Fortress of St. Petersberg, Russia, in 1851, Bakunin wrote his Confession at the direction of Russian Emperor Nicholas I.

The Confession accounts for Bakunin's political activities throughout the 1840s, from his original departure from Russia to Berlin in 1840 through his arrest in 1849. The work is neither a capitulation nor an act of defiance, but a combination. Bakunin told Alexander Herzen it was a combination of fancy and truth.

== Publication ==
Nicholas I read the Confession carefully, marking the text with marginalia and sharing it with his son, the tsarevitch, Alexander II as "very interesting and instructive". The work was held but not forgotten in the political police's archives for seventy years. The government later circulated extracts from the Confession to embarrass and discredit Bakunin.

Its full publication in 1921 was controversial, as some read Bakunin as genuflecting for clemency while others defended his criticism of Russian bureaucracy and silence about co-conspirators. Originally written in Russian, the Confession has since been published in Czech, French, German, Italian, and Polish, and only received its first English-language publication in its 1977 translation by Robert C. Howes, published by Cornell University Press along with the emperor's annotations.

== Legacy ==
Historian of anarchism Paul Avrich wrote of the importance of Bakunin's Confession as both a psychological and historial document, showing the roots of Bakunin's pan-Slavicism, antipathy for parliamentary government, plans for a revolutionary society, and mental state as a prisoner. Avrich said the Confession is among Bakunin's most interesting writings highlighting both his personality and an insider's account of the revolutionary 1840s. Avrich added that the author's tone of contrition was a "necessary expedient if he was ever to regain his freedom".

Max Nettlau and Vera Figner both wrote responses to the Confession.

== Bibliography ==
- Avrich, Paul (1978). "Review of The 'Confession' of Mikhail Bakunin". Slavic Review. 37 (1): 125–126. doi:10.2307/2494915. ISSN 0037-6779. JSTOR 2494915.
- Banerjee, Maria (1978). "Review of The 'Confession' of Mikhail Bakunin". Russian History. 5 (2): 227–229. ISSN 0094-288X. JSTOR 24649602.
- Giffin, Frederick C. (1978). "Review of The Confession of Mikhail Bakunin". The Western Political Quarterly. 31 (2): 307–308. doi:10.2307/447834. ISSN 0043-4078. JSTOR 447834.
- Kelly, Aileen (1979). "Review of The Confession of Mikhail Bakunin". The Slavonic and East European Review. 57 (1): 130–131. ISSN 0037-6795. JSTOR 4207780.
- Miller, Martin A. (1978). "Review of The Confession of Mikhail Bakunin". The American Historical Review. 83 (1): 232. doi:10.2307/1866047. ISSN 0002-8762. JSTOR 1866047.
- Sée, Henri (1932). "Review of Method in social science; a case book; Études socialistes. I: 1888-1897; Socialismes français : du socialisme utopique à la démocratie industrielle; Institutes de science économique. Tome II : Les bases du système économique; Confession, 1857; Das Kapital. Kritik der politischen Œconomie. Ungekürste Ausgabe nach der zweiten Auflage von 1872". Revue Historique (in French). 170 (1): 135–139. ISSN 0035-3264. JSTOR 40944901.
- Shatz, Marshall S. (2003). "Mikhail Aleksandrovich Bakunin". In Gillespie, Alyssa Dinega (ed.). Russian Literature in the Age of Realism. Dictionary of Literary Biography. Vol. 277. Detroit, MI: Gale. pp. 34–41. ISBN 9780787660215. Gale OOJNKW999627593.
- "The Confession Of Mikhail Bakunin". CHOICE: Current Reviews for Academic Libraries. October 1977. p. 1113. ISSN 0009-4978. Gale A31333411.
- "The Confession Of Mikhail Bakunin". America. August 20, 1977. p. 85. ISSN 0002-7049. Gale A31333410.
- "The Confession Of Mikhail Bakunin". Library Journal. Vol. 102. May 1, 1977. p. 1013. ISSN 0363-0277. Gale A31333413.
