= Georges Oltramare =

Swiss writer and fascist

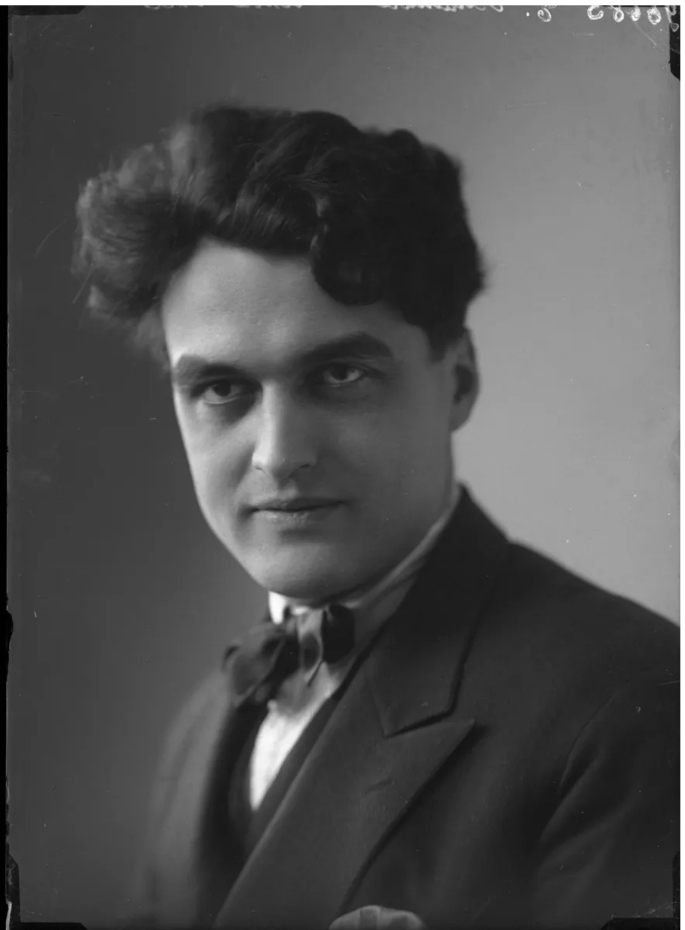
- (1923)
- Born: Georges Oltramare; 17 April 1896; Geneva, Switzerland
- Died: 16 August 1960 (aged 64); Geneva, Switzerland
- Other name: Charles Dieudonné
- Education: University of Geneva
- Occupations: Writer, journalist, actor
- Known for: Fascist politician
- Political party: Union Nationale
- Children: 1

Georges Oltramare (17 April 1896 – 16 August 1960) was a Swiss writer, journalist, actor, nationalist politician and fascist militant, who became involved in collaboration in Nazi-occupied France during World War II.

Born into a leading Geneva family, he obtained a demi-licence in law at the University of Geneva in 1919. He became a noted author, winning the Foundation Schiller prize for his 1927 play Don Juan ou la Solitude and also wrote for a number of newspapers. More specifically, he also founded Le Pilori, which specialized among other things in anti-Semitism. He began direct involvement in politics in 1930 when he was candidate for one of the siege of the gouvernment of Geneva (the Conseil d'Etat). After that he set up the Ordre politique national, merging this with the Union de Défense économique to form the Union nationale the following year. This nationalist movement, which represented the country's French population, gained around 10% of votes in Geneva and Oltramare was invited to participate in the anti-communist Entente nationale genevoise with center-right parties in 1936. He remained leader of the Union Nationale until 1939, but was then excluded from it. In 1940, he left the country and went to work in Italy, before settling in German-occupied France.

Adopting the pseudonym Charles Dieudonné, Oltramare took up his pen in support of the Nazis, eventually becoming director of La France au travail, a German-funded newspaper aimed at converting the country's trade unionists and former communists to the Nazi cause. Also writing for L'Appel and Revivre, as well as broadcasting on Radio Paris, Oltramare even survived an assassination attempt on the Champs-Élysées.

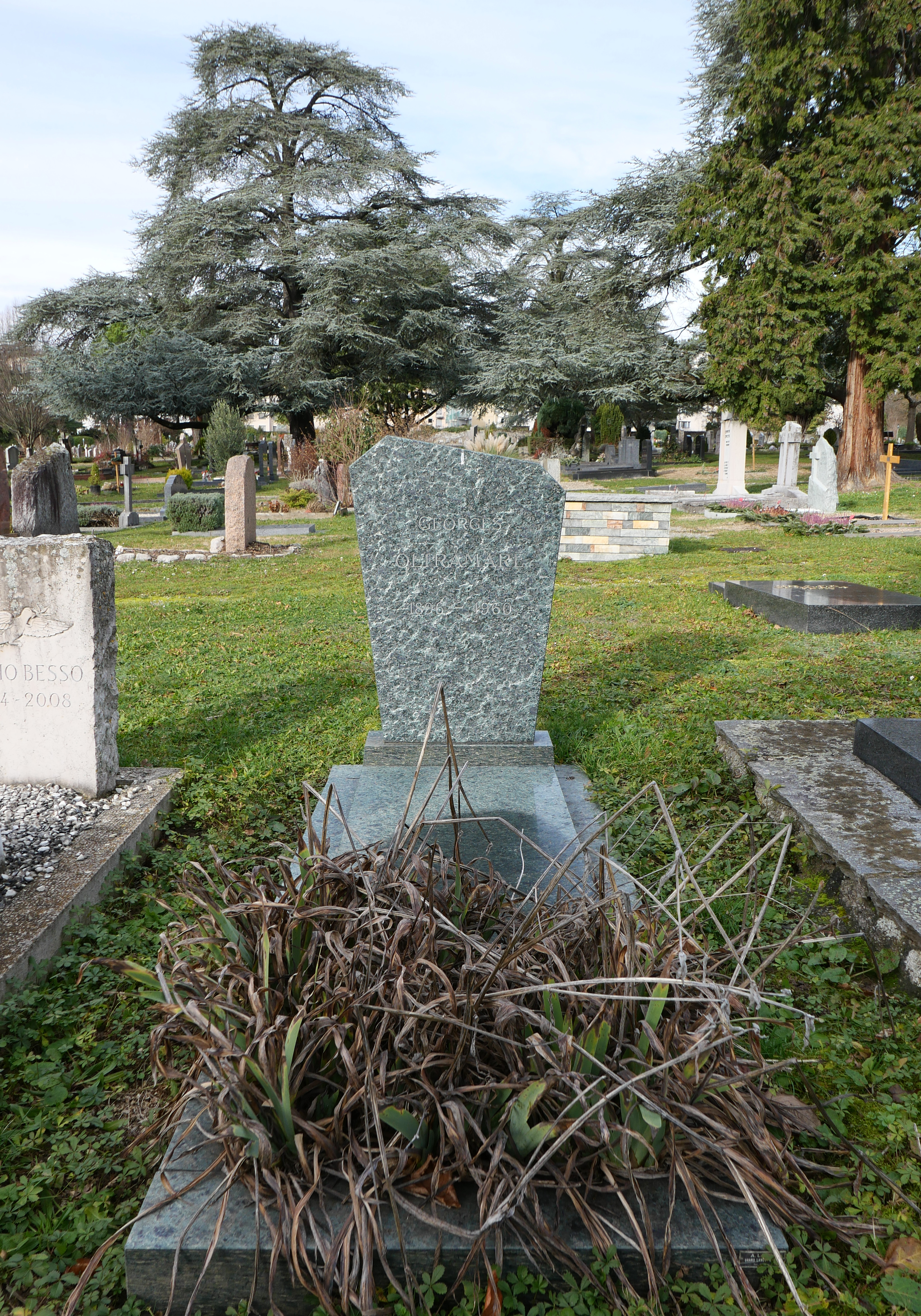
His tomb in Petit-Saconnex in the canton of Geneva in 2023.

Oltramare left France in August 1944 for Sigmaringen, eventually returning to Switzerland in April 1945. Arrested for compromising Switzerland's neutrality, he was sentenced to three years in prison by the Federal Supreme Court of Switzerland for collaboration. He was released from prison in 1949. He then lives between Geneva, Spain and Egypt, where he briefly worked as a propagandist for the nationalist regime of Gamal Abdel Nasser, before returning to Switzerland where in 1958 he revived Le Pilori, which combined again a form of Poujadism with anti-Semitism.

Notwithstanding a sentence of death that had been passed on him by a French court in 1950, Oltramare died of natural causes in Geneva in 1960. He was buried at the cemetery of Petit-Saconnex in Geneva next to his parents and his brother André Oltramare (1884-1947), a classical philologist and socialist politician.
