= Luigi Bertoni =

Italian-born anarchist (1872–1947)

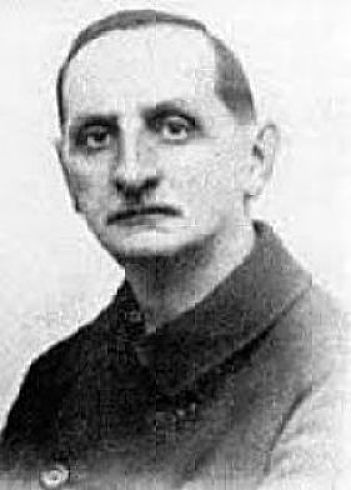
- Born: Ambrogio Luigi Giacinto Bertoni; 6 February 1872; Milan, Kingdom of Italy
- Died: 19 January 1947 (aged 74); Geneva, Switzerland
- Occupations: Writer; Typographer
- Movement: Anarchism

Ambrogio Luigi Giacinto Bertoni (6 February 1872 – 19 January 1947) was an Italian-born anarchist writer and typographer.

Bertoni fought on the Huesca front with Italian comrades during the Spanish Revolution and was, with Emma Goldman, one of the outspoken critics of anarchist participation in the Republican government after the Spanish Civil War.
