= National Union (Switzerland) =

National Union Union Nationale
- Leader: William Droin (1932–1933), Roger Steinmetz (1933–1935), Georges Oltramare (1935–1939)
- Governing body: Direction Counsel
- Founded: 1932
- Dissolved: 1945
- Merger of: Ordre politique nationale Union de défense économique
- Headquarters: Geneva
- Newspaper: Le Citoyen, L'Action nationale, Bulletin de l'Union nationale
- Membership (1937): c. 2,000
- Ideology: Fascism; Corporatism; Nationalism; Anti-communism
- Political position: Far-right
- Slogan: Une doctrine, une foi, un chef
- Anthem: Debout l'U.N.

Election symbol
- A sword and a cross

The National Union (French: Union nationale) was a nationalist political party in Switzerland between 1932 and 1945, that became fascist at some point. It was mainly active in the canton of Geneva.

== History ==
The National Union was founded in Geneva in 1932 by the merging of two parties, the Ordre politique national, founded in 1930 by the writer and journalist Georges Oltramare, and the Union de défense économique, founded in 1923 by a split from the right wing of the Democratic Party (which became later the Liberal Party). Oltramare spent four years as a member of the Federal Assembly of Switzerland representing the National Union. It became notorious for a demonstration in Geneva on November 9, 1932, when their march to the city's Salle Communale was counterdemonstrated by the Swiss Socialist Party, the Communist Party and anarchists. In the ensuing trouble, recruits of the Swiss army opened fire on the left demonstrators resulting in 13 deaths.

The National Union was the Swiss political movement most closely associated with Italian fascism. It supported extending suffrage to single women, collective bargaining, and antitrust action. It demanded the reduction of public spending and taxes, and opposed any new naturalization and social welfare for non-Genevans (welfare chauvinism). It gained nine seats in the Grand Council of Geneva in the 1933 cantonal election, ten seats in the 1936 one and twelve seats in the 1942 one. It also gained eight seats in 1935 in the Municipal Council of the City of Geneva and kepts two of them during the municipal elections of 1939.

The group began to decline by the late 1930s. In 1939, Oltramare left the party's leadership and was then excluded in 1940 by the new collective direction. After that he moved to Italy and then to German-occupied Paris in order to co-operate more closely with the Nazis. The party dissolved at the end of the war in 1945.
