= Léon Nicole =

Swiss politician, journalist, and trade unionist

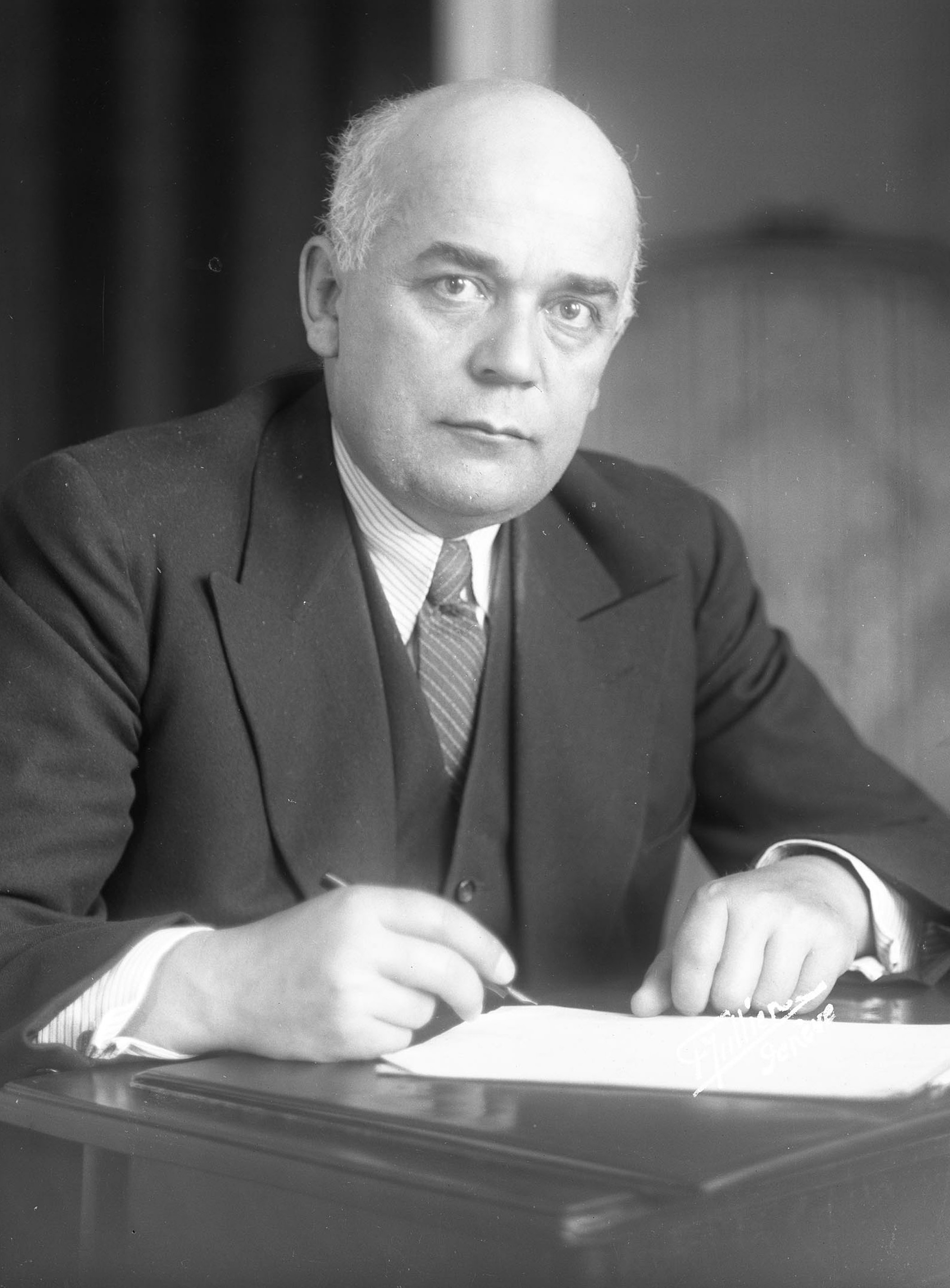
- April 1933

Member of the National Council
- In office 1 December 1919 – 12 June 1941

President of the Geneva Conseil d'État
- In office 4 December 1933 – 2 December 1934
- In office 1 December 1935 – 7 December 1936

Member of the Geneva Conseil d'État
- In office 26 November 1933 – 7 December 1936

Member of the National Council
- In office 1 December 1947 – 4 December 1955

Personal details
- Born: April 10, 1887 Montcherand, Vaud, Switzerland
- Died: June 28, 1965 (aged 78) Geneva, Switzerland
- Party: SP; FSS; PdA; PP
- Occupation: Trade unionist, journalist, newspaper editor

Léon Nicole (10 April 1887 – 28 June 1965) was a prominent trade unionist, journalist, politician and member of the Grand Council of Geneva and the Swiss National Council. In 1933, he was a member of the first Cantonal government in Switzerland with a Socialist majority and the first socialist ever elected to lead a Canton. He was elected the first President of the Swiss Party of Labour in 1944. In 1952 he was expelled from the Party of Labour because of his opposition to the party's support for Swiss neutrality on the grounds of the Zhdanov doctrine. He accused his former party of nationalism and Titoism, and in 1954 set up a rival communist party called the Progressive Party.

== Early life ==
Nicole attended school in his home village and Orbe before leaving for further education in St. Gallen. He worked in the postal service from 1905 to 1919, stationed in Geneva from 1911 and was a union leader between 1919 and 1921. He was editor of several socialist newspapers including Labour and Workers' Voice.

== Political career ==
Nicole joined the Swiss Socialist Party in 1909 and was active as a trade unionist. He was one of the leaders of the 1918 general strike in Geneva, was imprisoned and subsequently acquitted by a military court in 1919.

In 1919 he was elected to the National Council as a representative of the Socialist Party. He was also elected to the Grand Council of Geneva in 1919.

His role in the denunciation of the banking scandals of 1931 and in the November 9, 1932 shooting during which the Swiss army, called by the right-wing Geneva government, killed 13 people ensured him great popularity. Following his conviction at the trial in 1933, he was the first Socialist to be elected leader of a canton of Switzerland, when on 3 December he was voted into the Présidence (Presidency) of the Geneva Council of State, the executive body of the Republic and Canton of Geneva.

In 1939, Nicole took a supportive stance towards the Molotov-Ribbentrop Pact and was therefore expelled from the SP, along with the majority of the Geneva and Vaud cantonal parties, which sided with him. The Swiss Socialist Federation (FSS), founded by Nicole's supporters and led by him, was banned by the Federal Council in 1941. During the Second World War, Nicole was a correspondent for the Soviet news agency TASS in Switzerland and worked clandestinely, which led to him and his son Pierre being sentenced to three-weeks prison in 1943. In particular, he recruited informants for Sándor Radó 's agent network. In 1944 he was elected president of the newly founded Labour Party (PdA) and entrusted with the management of the newspaper La Voix ouvrière. In 1947 he was re-elected to the National Council. In 1952, Nicole, who was loyal to Stalin, was expelled from the PdA due to differences of opinion. In 1954 he founded the Progressive Party, which entered the Grand Council of Geneva for a single time in 1955.

Nicole who had mostly withdrawn from politics for almost a decade due to illness died in 1965 and was buried at Cimetière des Rois in Geneva.

== See also ==
- Plainpalais
