= Swiss Media Database =

Newspaper database

Swiss Media Database (SMD) is a Swiss newspaper-article and television-program database accessible at no charge to media professionals. The public can access its contents for a fee via the portal swissdox.ch.

== Organization and contents ==
The Swiss Media Database, founded in Zürich in May 1996 is a joint venture of publishing houses Ringier of Zofingen, Tamedia of Zürich, and Swiss Radio and Television. Each holds one-third of the shares.

The offerings of the participating publishers are in full text, and reproductions of the original newspaper pages are available. Full texts of most Swiss daily and weekly newspapers, print and online, are archived.

Since June 2019, broadcasts of the German-speaking Swiss television (SRF) and the Swiss television in French (RTS) have been indexed. Swiss Media Database (SMD) contains more than 33 million documents (as of 2019). About two million are added each year.

Since 2002, SMD has been providing paid access to its archives through the website swissdox.ch. The SMD, in cooperation with the Association of Swiss Professional Journalists, has also offered access for free lance journalists.

== Deletion of articles ==
The deletion of articles in the database is sometimes ordered by courts or by publishers on their own. These deletions have led to controversial discussions — for example on the coverage of Jolanda Spiess-Hegglin, a politician in the canton of Zug who quit the Alternative Green Party a year after a scandal in which she claimed to have been sexually abused by a fellow member of the cantonal parliament.
