= Baslerstab =

- Type: Free daily newspaper
- Owner: TX Group
- Publisher: Baslerstab
- Editor: Marco Lehtinen
- Founded: 1977; 49 years ago
- Language: German
- Headquarters: Basel
- Country: Switzerland
- Sister newspapers: Basler Zeitung
- OCLC number: 173954309
- Website: www.baslerstab.ch

The Baslerstab is a Swiss German-language free daily newspaper.

== History and profile ==
The paper was launched in 1977 as a result of the merger of the Basler Nachrichten and the National-Zeitung. The paper was published by Basler Zeitung Medien. The paper is headquartered in Based and is owned by TX Group.

It is published in three forms – a city edition and online newspaper, both from Monday through Friday; and a regional edition on Wednesdays and Fridays.

As of 2005, the newspaper had a circulation of 194,358 copies per day.

Basler Zeitung Medien also published the Basler Zeitung.
