= Ilse Stöbe =

German journalist and resistance fighter (1911–1942)

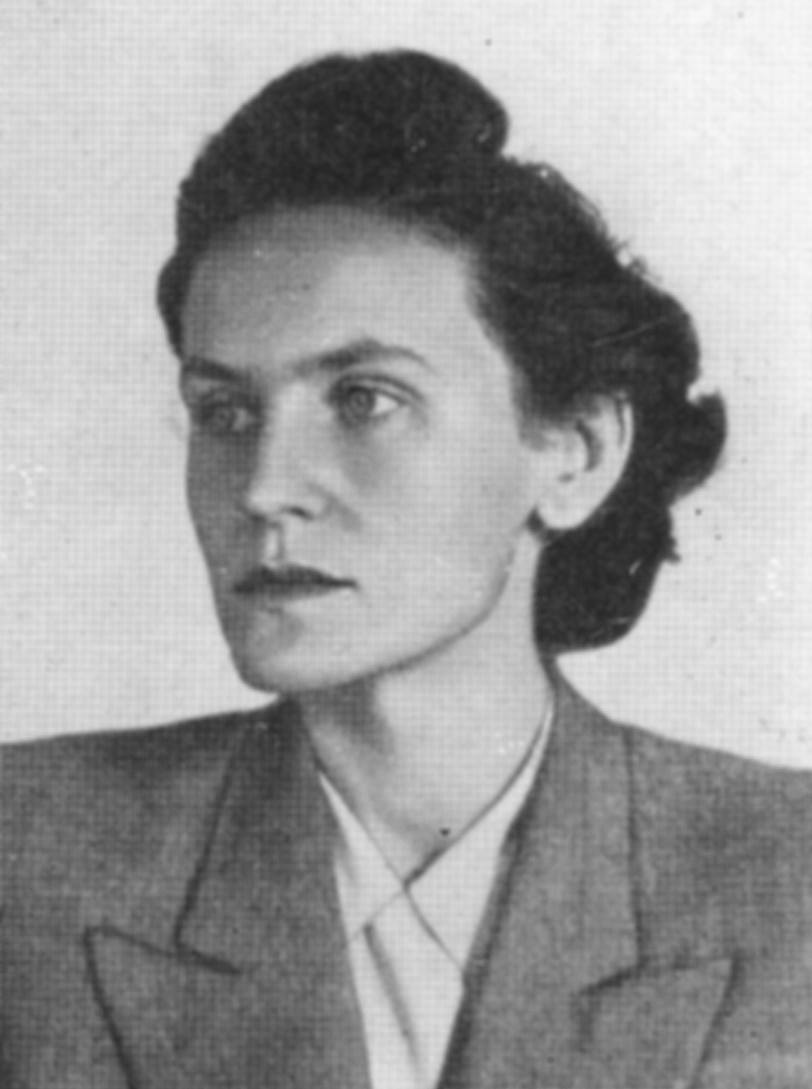
- Stöbe
- Born: Ilse Frieda Gertrud Stöbe; 17 May 1911; Berlin, German Empire
- Died: 22 December 1942 (aged 31); Plötzensee Prison; Berlin, Nazi Germany
- Cause of death: Decapitation
- Monuments: A Stolperstein near her place of death, a coin minted in her honour
- Occupations: Resistance member, journalist
- Known for: Informant for the GRU in Nazi Germany
- Movement: Communist Party of Germany
- Parents: Max Stöbe (father); Frieda (née Schumann) Stöbe (mother)

Ilse Frieda Gertrud Stöbe (17 May 1911 – 22 December 1942) was a German left-wing journalist, Soviet GRU agent and anti-Nazi resistance fighter. As a young woman, Stöbe was exposed to communist ideology through her parents. After her parents split up, she had to leave the Rathaus grammar school she was attending and trained as a typist.

In 1929, wanting to become a journalist, she was employed as a secretary at the Berliner Tageblatt newspaper. There she made deep impression on the editor Theodor Wolff, who wrote a novel about her, "Die Schwimmerin". While there she met the journalist Rudolf Herrnstadt who shared the same communist ideology. In 1931, Herrnstadt recruited Stöbe into the Soviet GRU as a spy. As her career progressed at the newspaper during the early 1930s she visited several countries in Europe to write articles, all the while conducting spying operations for the GRU. Forced to leave Germany in 1933 after losing her job due to the worsening political situation and the rise of Nazism, she first moved to Czechoslovakia. However her face became known after being seen with a Gestapo officer. The GRU then moved her to Warsaw in late 1935. There she worked as the foreign correspondent for the Swiss Neue Zürcher Zeitung newspaper and through them, met a group of left-leaning, liberal anti-nazis who worked at the German embassy. Amongst them was legation councillor Rudolf von Scheliha who supplied intelligence to Stöbe.

In 1939, when the German embassy closed in Warsaw due to the impending German invasion, she moved back to Berlin. There she commanded a Soviet espionage network, while working in the Foreign Office, receiving material from von Scheliha that was delivered to Soviet embassy. When Germany invaded the Soviet Union, she lost contact with Soviet intelligence. Several attempts were made by the GRU to contact her but these failed. Her network was discovered after a Soviet blunder led them to expose her details in a radio message. She was arrested and executed in 1942.

== Life ==
Ilse Stöbe grew up in a working-class home in Berlin. She was the only daughter of carpenter Max Stöbe and his wife Frieda née Schumann. Stöbe had an eight-year-older half-brother from her mother's first marriage, Kurt Müller. The family spent their first year at Mainzer Straße 1 in Lichtenberg, Berlin, before the couple moved to Jungstrasse 14 in Berlin. Both her parents were communist sympathisers but didn't join the Communist Party of Germany (KPD). Her half-brother was radicalised in the area they lived in, which was blighted by poverty and unemployment. It led him to become an active KPD member, taking part in bloody battles between the KPD and the SPD.

There is little information about their youth. However, it is likely she attended the local secondary school located about 3 minutes from her house, before receiving a recommendation to move to grammar school, attending School at the Rathaus in Lichtenberg. At Rathaus, she met her lifelong friend, later publisher and author Helmut Kindler. In 1927, her parents had separated and as a single parent her mother couldn't afford the fees, forcing her to leave in 1927. Her father was no longer mentioned in her letters to her mother, whom she was close to. Stöbe then attended a trade school (Volks- und Handelsschule) to learn a profession as a shorthand typist.

== Career ==
In April 1929, Stöbe began working in the marketing department of the publishing house of the democrat and liberal Rudolf Mosse and then worked as secretary to the journalist, writer Theodor Wolff who was editor-in-chief of the Mosse owned Berliner Tageblatt. Wolff strongly admired Stöbe and promoted her to an editor with her own office close to his. He would eventually write a novel "Die Schwimmerin. Ein Roman aus der Gegenwart" (The Swimmer. A novel from the present) that explores the relationship between bank director Ulrich Faber and his secretary Gerda Rohr. The literary figure of Rohr is based on Stöbe. The novel can best be described as a mood inspired by admiration rather than a description of any concrete events. Wolff's homage to Stöbe and his own reputation guarantees Stöbe's anti-Nazi, proletarian and humanist stance.

At the "Berliner Tageblatt" she met the Jewish editor and communist Rudolf Herrnstadt, eight years her senior and became good friends with him. The couple eventually became engaged. Herrnstadt believed that the political ideology of capitalism with its inherent structural problems in the 1920s, brought on by military defeat, reparations and debt would be replaced by socialism, or indeed communism. From the beginning, Stöbe shared the same political ideology as Herrnstadt. There was an expectation that both of them would join the KPD and several sources state that Stöbe joined the KPD in 1929. However, a study by the German historian Elke Scherstjanoi found that they were told by a KPD official in the Karl Liebknecht house, that they were more useful to the communist party, working outside the KPD. (Note: Herrnstadt joined the KPD on 1 July 1931 with membership number 521173 under the code name Friedrich Brockmann.) In 1930, when Herrnstadt was a correspondent for the Berliner Tageblatt in Prague, he repeatedly tried to join the communist party. His persistence brought him to the notice of Soviet military intelligence, who recruited him as a Red Army GRU agent and gave him the codename "Arbin".

== Resistance ==
When Herrnstadt returned to Berlin in 1931, he introduced Stöbe to "Dr. Bosch", who in reality was the Soviet rezident in Berlin, the Latvian Jewish communist and historian Yakov Bronin (1904–1984). Bronin recruited Stöbe as an agent for the GRU and gradually introduced her to intelligence work. Her codename was "Arnim". (Note: Stöbe was registered with Soviet intelligence in December 1932 with a codename of "F".) From 1931, she worked with Herrnstadt and collected reports that consisted of discussions with Wolff and editorial reports, that were delivered weekly. Being part of an espionage organisation meant clerking duties for Stöbe, e.g. photographing documents, but also involved working in operational tasks like maintaining contact with agents and communist groups in Berlin.

== Journalism ==
In early 1933, Stöbe lost her job when Wolff, who was told his name was on the SA death list, fled Germany. Her search for work became a major problem for Stöbe after 1933, as the German economy suffered from the effects of the Great Depression. Stöbe with encouragement from Wolff, decided to become a freelance journalist. In early 1933, Stöbe visited Poprad in the High Tatras in northern Slovakia to interview the Protestant Carpathian German community living there. Stöbe was particularly interested in how German minorities were affected by national policy in Poland and Czechoslovakia. While there, she fell seriously ill with abdominal pain and she was treated by a nephrologist, in an illness, which was the result of rape (Note: The evidence for this is based in a brief statement she made in a letter she sent to Carl Helfrich, while she was in prison.) and that was to affect her for the rest of her life.

During this period she would only return to Germany infrequently. In March 1933, her brother was severely beaten by the SA. On the 14 June 1933, she published her first article "Germanness abroad" on the Zipser Germans in the Berliner Tageblatt. In the same month, Bronin left Germany and he was replaced by Oskar Ansovich Stigga. Over the next two years, Stöbe undertook missions for Stiga that involved extensive travel to Austria, France, Switzerland, Czechoslovakia, Poland and Romania.

First impressions of Ilse Stöbe by her controller Oskar Ansovich Stigga

- Everything indicates that Ilse could become a good, steadfast spy due to her strength of character and emotional temperament if she did the right political work. In the future, she should be a time-honored intelligence officer".

In October 1933, she returned home to Berlin and lived with her mother, due to her illness.

On the 24 February 1934, her article on the peoples of the High Tatras was published in the Swiss newspaper, Neue Zürcher Zeitung (NZZ), appearing in the Sunday edition. The NZZ continued to publish her work, e.g. an article on FIS Nordic World Ski Championships in Vysoké Tatry was published between the 22 and 25 February 1935. In April 1934, Stöbe was again ill and was admitted to a Berlin hospital. However, the treatment was unsuccessful and in June 1934 she travelled to a sanatorium in the spa town of Franzensbad for further treatment. Several sources indicate that by mid-1934 that Stöbe was then a member of the National Socialist German Workers Party (Nazi Party), principally done to disguise her espionage activities. However a search of the archives of Berlin Document Center found no evidence of this. (Note: The reason for this confusion may be due to person with the same name but different date and/or place of birth.)

At the end of 1934, Stöbe moved to Breslau where she temporarily worked as a journalist for the Breslauer Neueste Nachrichten newspaper. In January 1934, the Nazi Schriftleitergesetz law (Editor's Law) came into effect, that delivered Nazi control of the German press. The organisation kept registries of “racially pure” Aryan editors and journalists and excluded Jews.

Stöbe had to be registered member, known as an "editor" of the (Reichspressekammer (Reich Press Chamber), a Nazi led department of the Reich Chamber of Culture. However, Stöbe failed in her application to the association on 7 June 1935, as she was considered insufficiently experienced to be a journalist.

== Bohemia ==
During this period, Stöbe worked as a courier for Stigga and made a number of trips to Bohemia, Czechoslovakia. However, in September 1934, her face became known as she was seen with a Gestapo officer. It resulted in a story being published in the Lidové Listy newspaper, that voiced the suspicion that she was a Gestapo agent. Stöbe was arrested and accused of collaboration by the Czech police. However, she convinced the police she wasn't a collaborator and a retraction had to be printed in the Lidové Listy. The GRU withdrew Stöbe from Prague and sent her to work in Vienna. Although it is not possible to determine how many trips Stöbe made to Bohemia, it is known that some of these trips were for spa treatment for her illness. (Note: Certainly the GRU were cognizant of Stöbe's illness and made attempts to accommodate her.)

== Warsaw ==
In November 1935, Stöbe moved to Warsaw and although they were a couple they lived apart in different parts of the city to reduce unwanted attention. As Herrnstadt was Jewish, it meant that marriage was impossible. There she worked as a foreign correspondent for the Swiss newspaper Neue Zürcher Zeitung, likely arranged through Wolff. Her first article in three parts for the newspaper was "Die deutsche Minderheit" (The German minority"), "Die Ukrainische Minderheit" ('The Ukrainian minority') and the third part was "Die Juden" ('The Jews'). The three-part article examined German, Ukrainian and Jewish minorities in Poland from a political, social, ethnic and religious aspect. (Note: Stöbe's journalistic work was largely unknown for decades as it was not considered important enough to research. Stöbe certainly wrote three articles for the Berliner Tageblatt, the Neue Zürcher Zeitung and the Thurgauer Zeitung with another 10 likely written by her in collaboration with Herrnstadt. There is no evidence she worked for the Lidové noviny.)

=== Alta ===
For the new mission she was assigned the new codename "Alta", and helped Herrnstadt establish the new residency in Warsaw, undertook the mundane tasks of intelligence work and worked to establish contact with potential recruits. From 1931 to 1939, Stöbe submitted 26 reports on foreign policy that were considered by Soviet intelligence as being "valuable". A report from Alta on 7 May 1939, states

"Alta reports: The DNB representative in Warsaw, Jaensch, who is primarily concerned with the Ukrainian question in Poland, is being informed by Kleist about German intentions regarding the front. Kleist reported that Berlin is currently considering how the Ukrainian problem could be most effectively exploited in the event of war. [...] The German concern is only that Russia could use the revelation of the Ukrainian problems as an opportunity to abandon its neutrality. In order to eliminate this danger, Berlin intends to give Russia credible and sufficient assurances that the raising of the German question in Poland will not be directed against Russia. It is intended to ensure that Germany has no intention of founding an independent Ukrainian state, but that it only intends to provide the Ukrainian population with extensive autonomy rights within the framework of a greatly reduced Polish state. Ilse Stöbe evidently maintains trusting contacts with the Posen journalist Erich Jaensch, who has been working for the German News Bureau (DNB) in Warsaw since 1936"

In Warsaw, Herrnstadt was in contact with a group of left-leaning, liberal anti-nazis. These included folk from the Germany embassy included the ambassador Hans-Adolf von Moltke, the legation councillor Rudolf von Scheliha and the press-secretary Hans Graf Huyn. as well as connections to the Polish writer Jarosław Iwaszkiewicz, poet Julian Tuwim, the actress Ida Kaminska and the Polish foreign minister Josef Beck. Herrnstadt's espionage group in Warsaw was made up him and Stöbe and included Gerhard Kegel and his wife Charlotte Vogt, the couple Marta (Margarita) and lawyer Kurt Welkisch, at times also the publisher Helmut Kindler and his childhood friend, the lawyer Lothar Bolz. Kindler in his book "Zum Abschied ein Fest : die Autobiographie eines deutschen Verlegers" (A farewell party: the autobiography of a German publisher) describes how he was recruited for a short time.

=== Unemployment ===
By 1936, using the Editor's Law, the Reich Ministry of Public Enlightenment and Propaganda had removed many foreign Jewish correspondents and by that point only a few remained. Herrnstadt was one of them. Although Moltke was politically sympathetic to Herrnstadt, he couldn't defend him as he was Jewish and from that point forward he avoided all contact with him. Rudolf von Scheliha was of a different mettle and continued to maintain contact with Herrnstadt and the Stöbe, although their meetings were kept secret. Both Herrnstadt and von Scheliha had similar political views on the Nazis. On 12 March 1936, Herrnstadt left the Berliner Tageblatt. His lack of employment would have presented real financial problems for the couple as Stöbe's odd article for the Swiss newspaper couldn't support them. He was quoted as saying "After my dismissal, which was forced upon me by German anti-Jewish legislation [...], my journalistic work [...] from 1936 onwards became more and more a fiction, and the maintenance of this fiction became more and more difficult." Stöbe found help through Wilm Stein, the embassy press attaché, who petitioned the Propaganda Ministry but they refused to reconsider her application, the reason given was that she worked for a Swiss newspaper that was banned in Germany.

=== Journalism ===
In June 1936, Stöbe covered the 1936 Summer Olympics in Berlin where she met and became involved with the Swiss publisher Rudolf Huber, and considered marrying him. Huber was the owner of the Swiss newspaper Thurgauer Zeitung, which provided new opportunities for work for Stöbe but also for extensive travel that was useful to the GRU. It is unknown how Stöbe and Herrnstadt supported themselves financially during this period. It was likely Huber who supported the couple between 1936 and 1939. When Huber died on 7 January 1940 of kidney disease, his death distressed her deeply. In a letter to Herrnstadt in August 1940, she stated that "His last thoughts and words belonged to me". Huber's closeness to Stöbe resulted in him leaving a major part of his fortune to her in his will, that included his publishing firm, Huber and Co that she sold back to Huber's family.

By 1937, Stöbe journalistic work was largely accepted by the German embassy in Warsaw. In mid-September, Von Scheliha agreed to supply Herrnstadt with secret reports from the embassy, that he firmly believed were going to British intelligence – an effective sleight of hand from Herrnstadt. From November 1937 to August 1939, Herrnstadt received 211 reports from Von Scheliha on information as varied as talks between Hitler and Ribbentrop with Romania, Hungarian, Yugoslavia and Bulgaria to the economic situation in Germany.

In August 1938, Stöbe's three part article on minorities was published in the Swiss newspaper Thurgauer Zeitung. In late 1938, the Frankfurt-based daily newspaper Frankfurter General-Anzeiger proposed to hire Stöbe. On the 6 December 1938, the propaganda ministry asked the embassy press advisory board for an opinion. Press councillor Wilhelm Baum reported that it had received a positive opinion on Stöbe. At the end of 1938, Stöbe was appointed as cultural advisor in the Women's League of the Nazi Party foreign organisation in Warsaw, a position that was approved by the GRU. The work involved a monthly meeting where three or four women give short lectures on specific subjects close to the heart of the Nazi party, i.e. "educate the German women in Warsaw in the National Socialist spirit".

On 5 January 1939, Baum was again asked for an opinion and replied he had "no objections to the political reliability of the applicant" and supported her application to be a journalist.

=== Polish invasion ===
On the 16 August 1939, Herrnstadt and Stöbe learned from Von Scheliha that the invasion of Poland by Germany was planned for 1 September 1939 and that the German embassy was closing in three days. At the time, the GRU were keen to maintain contact with Von Scheliha and as Herrnstadt was Jewish he couldn't return to Germany, leaving Stöbe to be the primary contact for Von Scheliha. It had been agreed by Soviet intelligence that from that point forward, Stöbe was to be main rezident in Berlin. When Von Scheliha was informed of the new arrangement, he was initially against it as he believed a woman couldn't meet the demands of the arrangement but he was finally convinced on 22 August 1939, when Herrnstadt informed him that he had complete confidence in Stöbe.

== Group Alta ==
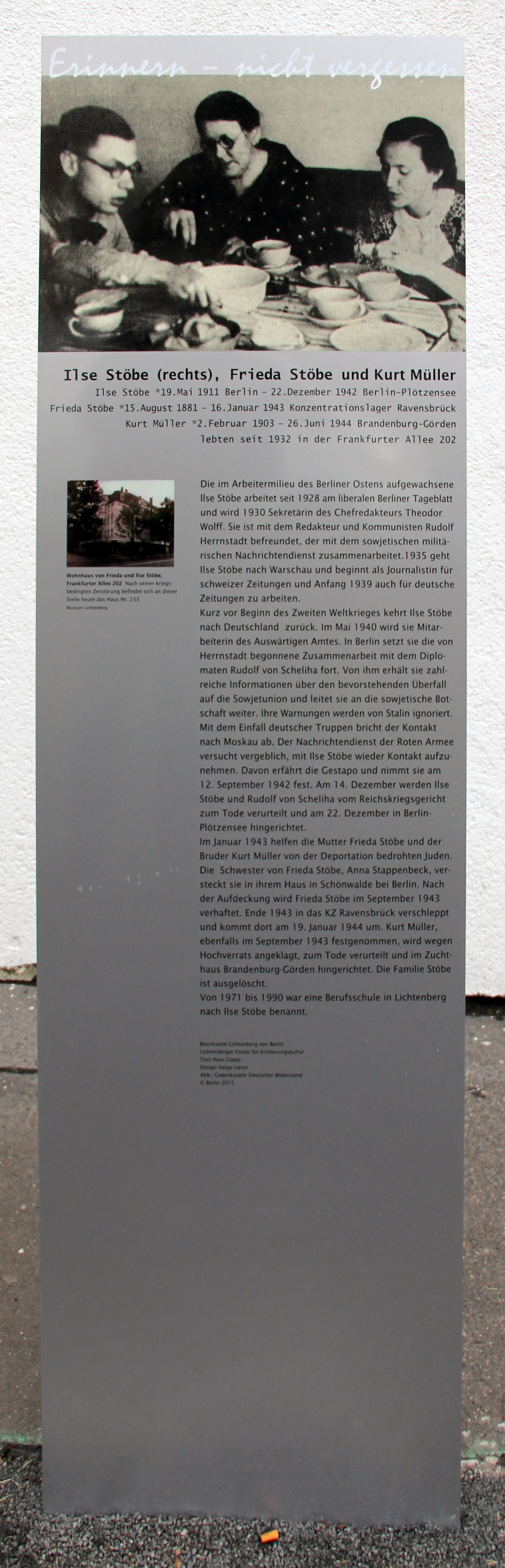
Memorial plaque, Frankfurter Allee 233, in Lichtenberg, Berlin

Stöbe's activities as a GRU agent from 1939 onwards were reconstructed by Russian historian Vladimir Lota. In August 1939, just before the Invasion of Poland Stöbe left Warsaw along with Margarita and Kurt Welkisch. She initially visited Huber in Switzerland before travelling to Berlin arriving in October or early November 1939. At the time, Stöbe was unemployed and had to seek work near Von Scheliha. Her initial group was composed of Kurt Welkisch, Margarita Welkisch and Gerhard Kegel. Stöbe's first administrative action was meeting GRU spy Nikolaj Saitzew to provide a status report and receive initial funding for the rezidency. On 8 December 1939, Von Scheliha reported on the German planned invasion of France and Low Countries. The news was welcomed by the GRU as it proved the rezidency was viable. By mid-December the rezidency was still being established. The Welkisch couple were moved to Bucharest where Kurt Welkisch worked as a correspondent and the Kegel couple were in Moscow.

On 1 January 1940, Von Scheliha found a position in Subdivision XI "Combating Enemy Atrocity Propaganda" in the information department of the Foreign Office (Auswärtiges Amt). In January 1940, the diplomat and commercial specialist Gerhard Kegel had accepted a position as the deputy trade envoy in the German embassy in Moscow. He worked with German diplomat Karl Schnurre, who was director of the East Group of the Trade Policy Department, to prepare a German-Soviet trade agreement. On the 9 January 1940, Schnurre informed Kegel that Hitler had decided that the Molotov–Ribbentrop Pact would be broken. In April 1940, she received intelligence from journalist Richard Daub, who had been conscripted into the Kriegsmarine that one of the Scandinavian countries were to be attacked. On 9 April 1940, Nazi Germany conducted Operation Weserübung, the invasion of Norway. On the 10 May 1940, the Battle of France began. Stöbe made a report that was quoted in Pravda, "The future peace treaty will raise the question of the complete division of France. Hitler sent a letter to Mussolini on May 19. In German circles, it is expected that Italy will participate in the war on Germany's side. The military successes were a surprise even to military experts. They expected more stubborn resistance from the allies".

=== Foreign Office ===
At some point in late 1939 or early 1940, Stöbe met the journalist Carl Helfrich either in Berlin or possibly Frankfurt. (Note: The date and place they met is not known. Certainly it is known that Helfrich moved to Berlin in the summer of 1939.) By April 1940, Helfrich had been recruited as an informant by Stöbe and with the help of Von Scheliha, had found a position working as a research assistant with the rank of legation secretary in the Foreign Office.

In May 1940, with the help of Von Scheliha, Stöbe found a job in subdivision III of the information department of the Foreign Office. Her position involved writing pro-German articles that were published in the foreign press, essentially to counter foreign propaganda. In a letter to Herrnstadt, she told him that she found the work stressful and frightening. This was perhaps less to do with the chance of discovery and more to do with the horrific nature of the reports she was receiving from the occupied countries in the east. In August 1940, she was invited to interview Mihail Manoilescu, the Romanian Foreign Minister. On her return, Stöbe visited Herrnstadt parents in Prague, as Herrnstadt hadn't seen them since 1937. Stöbe sent glad news of the visit to Herrnstadt but it was the last word he heard, as his family was deported to a concentration camp in 1942 and no trace was found of them after the war.

=== Bad health ===
When she returned to Germany, Stöbe made another visit to sanatorium in the Franzensbad due to her health. At the end of August and still seriously ill, Stöbe visited Carlsbad but the treatment was unsuccessful as she could no longer walk. When she returned to Berlin, she sought treatment with the German gynecologist Georg August Wagner at Charité. At the end of September 1940, a report sent to Soviet intelligence containing details of German reinforcements in the east, also contained a report on Stöbe health, stating she had a nervous breakdown as she was suffering from both Kidney and Liver disease and needed both money to live and treatment. From 13 October, using GRU funds, she had further treatment in Franzensbad that continued through November.

At the end of December 1940, Stöbe was laid off work at the Foreign Office. At the time she was still extremely ill and asked Soviet intelligence if she could move from Berlin to Eger for several months for treatment but still be able work in the residency in Berlin 8 days every 3 weeks but they refused Stöbe's doctor advised her not to work during the winter months.

=== Operation Barbarossa ===
On 18 December 1940, Adolf Hitler made plans for the invasion of the Soviet Union when he signed Directive 21, which was to be executed as Operation Barbarossa. On 28 December, Stöbe learned about the plans from Von Scheliha and passed the reports to Soviet intelligence. The Soviet government were initially wary of the reports as they contradicted the German–Soviet Boundary and Friendship Treaty. On the 4 January 1941, Von Schiela confirmed that the invasion of the Soviet Union was to begin in the spring of 1941. As the date approached, Soviet intelligence told its cutout Nikolaj Saitzew, they he should only contact Stöbe once a month. In late 1940, the question of training Stöbe as a wireless telegraphy operator had been raised, but no radio specialists were available in Berlin. In February 1941, Stöbe confirmed that Germany would likely attack the Soviet Union on 15 May 1941. In a meeting with Saitzew on 5 April, he was informed by Stöbe that Yugoslavia would be invaded that night. The following month, Stöbe reconfirmed the Soviet invasion date as 15 June.

Although her intelligence work was progressing well, her interminable search for paid work continued. In a letter to Herrnstadt on 25 April 1941, she told him she was unable to find any journalism work, but had found paid work the previous month through a friend, in the advertising department of the Dresden-based pharmaceutical preparations manufacturer Lingnerwerke AG, advertising Odol toothpaste abroad. She was relieved that didn't have write any more articles. She also informed Herrnstadt of her relationship with Helfrich. She received scant information from Herrnstadt in his letters, but didn't know that he couldn't speak of their relationship, as it would endanger his position in the GRU, nor the fact that her recruiter, Oskar Stigga had disappeared. (Note: Stigga was placed on an execution list by Stalin on 26 July 1938, in a series of killings that became known as the Great Purge. Stigga was arrested, sentenced and executed on 29 July 1938 at Komunarka landfill, after being found guilty in a military trial by the Military Collegium of the Supreme Court of the Soviet Union of a being spy for a Latvian espionage organisation.) Instead they spoke about the minutia of intelligence work and how Von Schiela's career was progressing. At the time she was worried that the invasion warnings wouldn't be taken seriously and tried to warn Hernstadt "It is difficult for me to follow the entire preparation for the conflict. Keep your eyes open and don't fool yourself. Ilse". In May, Stöbe reported that military forces were continuing to build up on the Soviet border. In May 1941, she received a letter in return from Hernstadt, congratulating her on her birthday during that week and the ten years of intelligence work, but failed to allay her fears from the previous letter. On 7 June 1941, she met Saitzew for the last time, informing him that the invasion would happen after the 20 June 1941 date. On the 12 June, she meets her new contact "Tal", an embassy employee whose task was to teach her how to use a wireless transmitter, but the training never took place. Stöbe informs him there is no doubt that the attack will happen between 15 June and 20 June which is confirmed by new intelligence from Von Schiela. In a further meeting the dates were reconfirmed to 22–25 June.

=== No contact ===
Shortly after the German invasion of the Soviet Union on 22 June 1941, the Soviet embassy in Berlin ceased operation and its legation expelled. At that point Soviet intelligence lost the connection with Stöbe. At the end of August 1941, Soviet GRU agent Anatoly Gurevich who was a member of group of Soviet agents in Belgium, was ordered to reestablish contact with Stöbe. As he was an employee of the commercial organisation Simexco that supplied materials to Organisation Todt, the German military engineering organisation, he was able to travel freely. Such was Soviet intelligence's need to contact Stöbe they forwarded an expansive and dangerous radio message that gave the addresses of Stöbe mother. As part of a second mission for Gurevich, the message also contained addresses of the couple Harro Schulze-Boysen and Libertas Schulze-Boysen, resistance fighters working in Berlin, along with Kurt Schulze However, Gurevich failed to find Stöbe (who was working in Dresden) nor her mother who had moved apartment but did manage to contact the Schulze-Boysens and Kurt Schulze.

=== Soviet parachutists ===
As Soviet intelligence were unable to make contact with Stöbe, amongst others, they decided to parachute in a group of agents into Germany to make contact with their lost agents. These were ideologically sound communists who were specially trained to clandestinely work within the enemy territory. Each brought along a wireless telegraphy radio set, food stamps, money and identity documents. They were tasked with contacting different resistance fighters within Germany. On the night of 16–17 May 1942, Erna Eifler parachuted into a location close to the city of Allenstein in East Prussia with her husband, Wilhelm Fellendorf. (Note: The activities of this group is known, only due to the work of Gertrud Bobek and Leni Berner who worked in the group. Bobbek produced a book "Erinnerungen an mein Leben : aufgeschrieben in Taucha in den Jahren 1965 bis 1985" (Memories of my life: written down in Taucha in the years 1965 to 1985) where she described how she and her husband Felix Bobek worked with Gerda Sommer (the alias Eifler was using). "Gerda delivered the material we had to photograph for a long time. She loved to dress a bit conspicuously, which drew attention to her unnecessarily and was therefore criticised by us ... She spoke(d) of Martin (Bahnick) in an arrogant tone, which outraged us, and had(d) extravagant trains of thought".) who together formed an operational group whose task was to contact Stöbe. The couple travelled to Berlin and stay at Emil Hübner's apartment for two nights but are unable to contact Stöbe who is working in Dresden or her mother, so are unable to complete their mission. Unable to find permanent accommodation, the couple travel to Hamburg where Fellendorf's mother lived. The couple were eventually arrested by the Gestapo on 15 October 1942.

Soviet intelligence made a second attempt to contact Stöbe when they arranged for Soviet GRU agents Else Noffke and Georg Tietze to be trained by British security service in August 1942 before being sent into Germany. (Note: On 30 September 1941, an agreement was reached between the Special Operations Executive and the NKVD to cooperate on subversive warfare missions that included training of Soviet agents in United Kingdom. Once trained they were flown by the RAF from RAF Tempsford and parachuted into Germany. These operations were known as Operation Pickaxe in the UK.) Noffke lost her radio transmitter while travelling from Murmansk to England when her ship was torpedoed but the mission still took place. In February 1943, the couple was parachuted into Southern Germany by the Royal Air Force. The couple's mission was a failure and they were arrested by the Gestapo at the end of 1943.

In February or March 1942, Stöbe left her employment at Lingnerwerke and returned to Berlin. During this period Stöbe never made contact with any resistance organisation in Berlin, although she knew such organisations existed through Erika von Brockdorff. In April 1942, Von Schiela found her a position in the information department of Foreign Office for three months.

== Arrest ==
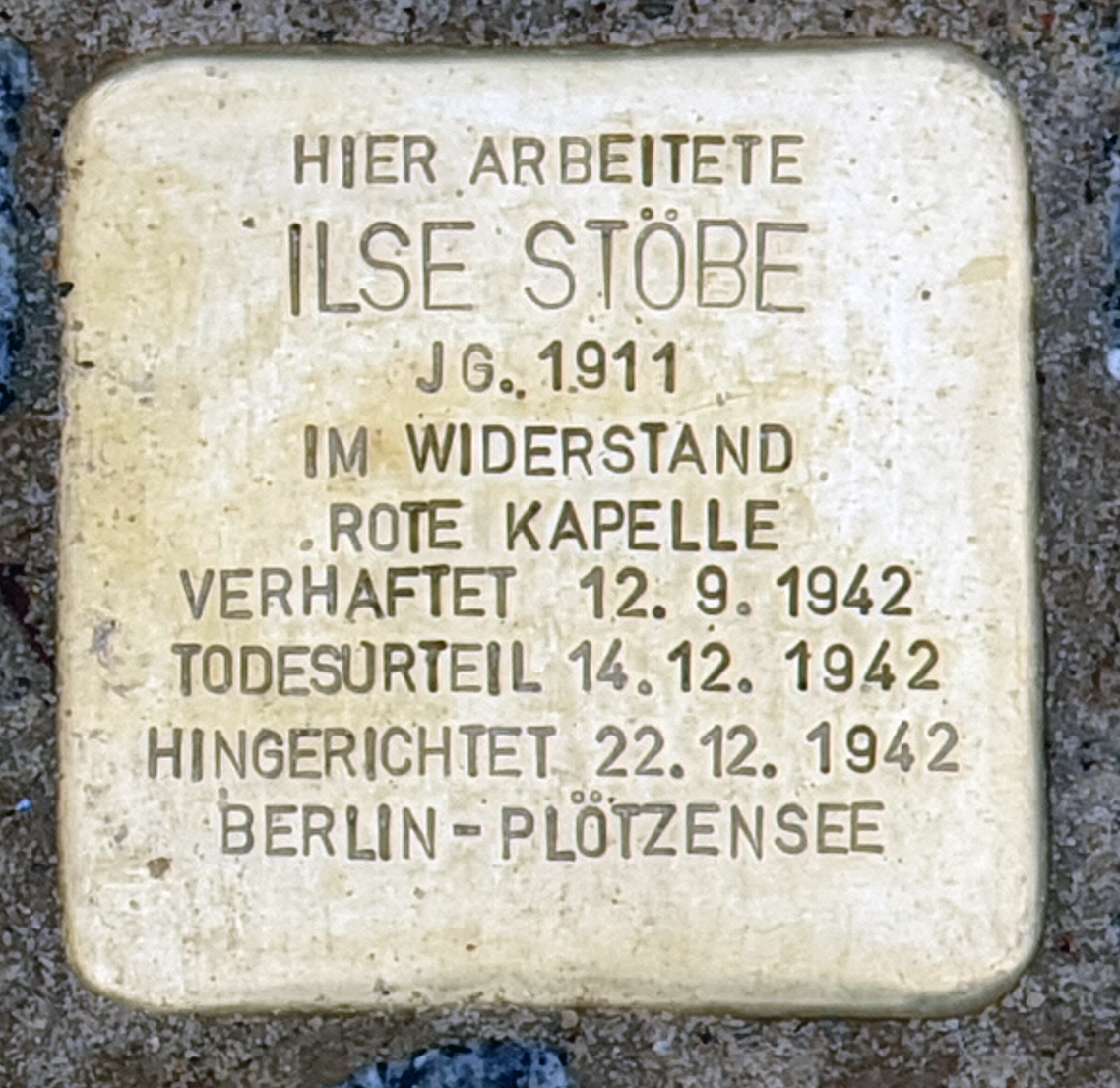
Stolperstein

On 12 September 1942, Stöbe along with Carl Helfrich were arrested by the Gestapo in their apartment at Ahornallee 48 in the Westend of Berlin. Stöbe was charged for spying for the Soviet Union and for membership of the Red Orchestra (Die Rote Kapelle). Soviet blundering had led to their arrest when they forwarded a message to Gurevich on 28 August 1941 that was decoded by Wilhelm Vauck of the Funkabwehr in July 1942 that contained sufficient detail to identify Stöbe. After seven weeks of torture she was compelled to confess to conspiratorial connections to the Soviet secret service and to Rudolf von Scheliha. He was arrested on 12 October 1942. Both were sentenced to death for treason on 14 December 1942 by the Reichskriegsgericht, and executed on 22 December 1942 in the Plötzensee Prison in Berlin, she by guillotine and he by hanging from a meathook. The Soviet agent, Heinrich Koenen, who had landed in Germany by parachute, was arrested at her house by a waiting Gestapo official. The Nazi German tradition of Sippenhaft led to the arrest of her mother, Frieda Stöbe. She was sent to Ravensbrück concentration camp, where she died in 1943. Stöbe's brother Kurt Müller was able to escape arrest and continue his resistance activities with the resistance group, the European Union Resistance. He was executed in June 1944. Carl Helfrich survived his imprisonment first in Sachsenhausen concentration camp then in Mauthausen concentration camp. After the war, he referred to Stöbe as his "bride".

== Awards and honours ==
Stöbe was the only woman to be featured on a special coin issued by the East German Ministry of State (Stasi) to commemorate important spies in Communist service during the war. The Ilse Stöbe Vocational School in Market Street, Berlin is named in her honour.

In October 2013, the Federal Foreign Office began considering whether Stöbe should be on the honorary staff list of those who resisted Nazism. On the 10th July 2014, Germany's Foreign Ministry honoured Stöbe for her actions against the Nazis.

== Citations ==
=== Bibliography ===
- Adams, Jefferson (2009). Historical Dictionary of German Intelligence. Scarecrow Press. ISBN 978-0-8108-6320-0.
- Bobek, Gertrud (1998). Erinnerungen an mein Leben : aufgeschrieben in Taucha in den Jahren 1965 bis 1985 [Memories of my life : written down in Taucha in the years 1965 to 1985] (1st ed.). Taucha: Tauchaer Verlag. ISBN 9783910074934. OCLC 53334199.
- Barck, Simone (2017). "Widerstands-Geschichten und Helden-Berichte" [Resistance stories and heroic reports] (PDF). Geschichte Als Herrschaftsdiskurs. Der Umgang mit der Vergangenheit in der DDR. Zeithistorische Studien, 14.4 (in German). Potsdam: Zentrum für Zeithistorische Forschung Potsdam e.V.: 119–173. doi:10.14765/zzf.dok.1.1059. OCLC 1189915903.
- "Caro, Walter". Karl Dietz Verlag Berlin (in German). Bundesstiftung zur Aufarbeitung der SED-Diktatur. May 2008.
- Coppi, Hans Coppi; Danyel, Jürgen; Tuchel, Johannes (1994). Die Rote Kapelle im Widerstand gegen den Nationalsozialismus [The Red Orchestra in Resistance to National Socialism]. Schriften der Gedenkstätte Deutscher Widerstand. Vol. 1. Gedenkstätte Deutscher Widerstand. ISBN 978-3-89468-110-4. OCLC 31510338.
- Coppi, Hans; Kebir, Sabine (2013). Ilse Stöbe : wieder im Amt : eine Widerstandskämpferin in der Wilhelmstrasse : eine Veröffentlichung der Rosa-Luxemburg-Stiftung [Ilse Stöbe: back in office: a resistance fighter in the Wilhelmstrasse: a publication of the Rosa Luxemburg Foundation] (in German). Hamburg: VSA. ISBN 978-3-89965-569-8. OCLC 856798644.
- "Ilse Stöbe". Gedenkstätte Deutscher Widerstand (in German). German Resistance Memorial Center. Archived from the original on 6 July 2020.
- Kindler, Helmut (1992). Zum Abschied ein Fest : die Autobiographie eines deutschen Verlegers [To leave one party: the autobiography of a German publisher] (in German). Munich: Droemer Knaur. ISBN 3426750422. OCLC 468300078.
- Kesaris, Paul. L, ed. (1979). The Rote Kapelle: the CIA's history of Soviet intelligence and espionage networks in Western Europe, 1936–1945. Washington DC: University Publications of America. ISBN 0-89093-203-4.
- Kühn, Alexander (30 September 2014). "Mut zur Wahrheit". Spiegel Geschichte. 5. Spiegel-Verlag: 108–109. Archived from the original on 22 June 2024.
- Müller-Enbergs, Helmut (1991a). Der Fall Rudolf Herrnstadt: Tauwetterpolitik vor dem 17. Juni [The case of Rudolf Herrnstadt: Thaw policy before 17 June] (in German). Berlin: Ch. Links Verlag. ISBN 978-3-86153-003-9. OCLC 24679707.
- Müller-Enbergs, Helmut (1991b). "Welchen Charakter hatte die Volkskammer nach den Wahlen am 18. März 1990?". In Klingemann, HD; Stöss, R; Weßels, B (eds.). Politische Klasse und politische Institutionen [Political class and political institutions]. Schriften des Zentralinstituts für sozialwissenschaftliche Forschung der Freien Universität Berlin, ehemals Schriften des Instituts für politische Wissenschaft. Vol. 66. Wiesbaden: VS Verlag für Sozialwissenschaften. pp. 235–255. doi:10.1007/978-3-322-94153-4_10. ISBN 978-3-531-12306-6. OCLC 913711198.
- Murphy, David E. (2005). What Stalin Knew: The Enigma of Barbarossa. New Haven: Yale University Press. p. 64. ISBN 978-0-300-13026-3. OCLC 191934962.
- Perrault, Gilles (1969). The Red Orchestra. New York: Schocken Books. ISBN 0-8052-0952-2. OCLC 797147560.
- Pine, Lisa (1 June 2013). "Family Punishment in Nazi Germany: Sippenhaft, Terror and Myth". German History. 31 (2): 272–273. doi:10.1093/gerhis/ghs131. ISSN 0266-3554.
- Ross, Corey (14 August 2008). "Political Control and Commercial Concentration Under the Nazis". Media and the Making of Modern Germany: 266–301. doi:10.1093/acprof:oso/9780199278213.003.0009. ISBN 978-0-19-927821-3.
- Rothenbühler, Verena (2006). "Rudolf Huber". Historisches Lexikon der Schweiz (in German). Bern: Schweizerische Akademie der Geistes- und Sozialwissenschaften.
- Sassning, Ronald. "Erwin Panndorf (1904–1942) Gera – Moskau – Spanien – Berlin. Der Weg zu antifaschistischen Fronten" (PDF). The Rosa Luxemburg Foundation (in German). Berlin.
- Scherstjanoi, Elke (2014). "Verräterin oder Patriotin? Ein Gutachten des Instituts für Zeitgeschichte" [Traitor or patriot? An opinion of the Institute of Contemporary History]. Vierteljahrshefte für Zeitgeschichte (in German). 62 (1). Munich: De Gruyter Oldenbourg (Deutschland): 139–156. doi:10.1515/vfzg-2014-0006. S2CID 199575964.
- Scherstjanoi, Elke (27 August 2013). "Ilse Stöbe (1911–1942) im Widerstand gegen das "Dritte Reich"" (PDF). Institut für Zeitgeschichte. Munich: Leibniz Institute of Contemporary History.
- Steinmeier, Frank-Walter (10 July 2014). "Rede von Außenminister Steinmeier bei der Gedenkstunde zur Ehrung von Ilse Stöbe am 10. Juli 2014 im Auswärtigen Amt". Auswärtigen Amt (in German). Berlin.
- O'Sullivan, Donal (December 2004). "Dealing With the Devil: The Anglo-Soviet Parachute Agents (Operation 'Pickaxe')". Journal of Intelligence History. 4 (2): 33–65. doi:10.1080/16161262.2004.10555099.
- Tuchel, Johannes (1988). "Weltanschauliche Motivationen in Der Harnack/Schulze-Boysen-Organisation: (Rote Kapelle)". Kirchliche Zeitgeschichte (in German). 1 (2): 267–292. JSTOR 43750615.
- Tyas, Stephen (2017). SS-Major Horst Kopkow: From the Gestapo to British Intelligence. Fonthill Media. ISBN 9781781555989. OCLC 990804265.
- Wiegrefe, Klaus (1 October 2013). "German Ministry Ponders Honoring Soviet Spy". Hamburg: Spiegel-Verlag. Spiegel International.
- Woermann, Heinrich-Wilhelm (1991). Widerstand in Charlottenburg (PDF). Schriftenreihe über den Widerstand in Berlin von 1933 bis 1945 (in German). Vol. 5 (2nd updated ed.). Berlin.
- Wolff, Theodor (1937). Die Schwimmerin. Ein Roman aus der Gegenwart [The swimmer. A novel from the present]. Zürich. OCLC 7371377.
- "Ilse Stöbe". Gedenkstätte Deutscher Widerstand (in German). German Resistance Memorial Center.
