= Der Bund =

Swiss daily newspaper

Der Bund (English: The Union)

- Der Bund front page of 15 October 2009
- Type: Daily newspaper
- Format: Berliner
- Owner(s): Tamedia (TX Group)
- Founder: Franz Louis Jent
- Publisher: Charles von Graffenried
- Editor-in-chief: Patrick Feuz
- Founded: 1 October 1850; 175 years ago
- Political alignment: Liberalism
- Language: German
- Headquarters: Bern
- Country: Switzerland
- Circulation: 52,705 (as of 2009)
- Sister newspapers: Newsnetz papers, including Berner Zeitung, Tages-Anzeiger and Basler Zeitung
- ISSN: 1421-1769 (print); 2673-7809 (web)
- OCLC number: 12417442
- Website: derbund.ch

Der Bund (English: The Union) is a Swiss German-language daily newspaper published in Bern.

Established in 1850 and associated with the cause of liberalism, it was among the leading quality newspapers in Switzerland for much of the 19th and 20th centuries. In economic distress since the 1980s, its circulation has dropped and it has changed ownership several times since then. It is now owned by the Tamedia publishing group.

== History ==
=== 19th century ===
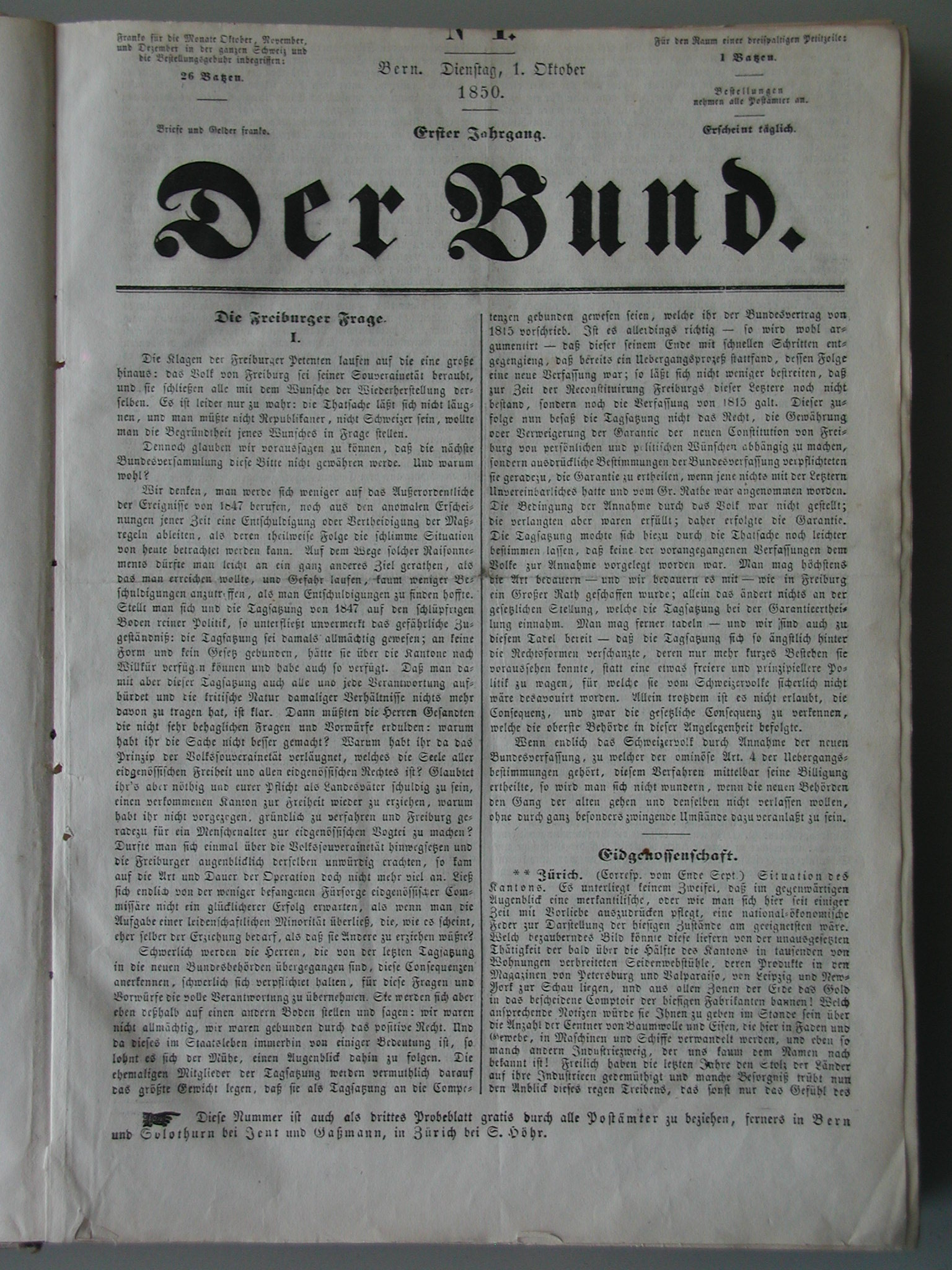
Der Bund's first edition

The newspaper was founded by Franz Louis Jent, a bookseller from Solothurn and veteran of the Freischarenzüge – the Liberal insurrections of 1844–45 that led to the 1847 Sonderbund War, a Swiss civil war. The newspaper's name, Der Bund, translates as "The Union", but is also shorthand for the Swiss Confederation, the democratic federal state established in 1848 by the Liberal victors of the civil war.

The newspaper was first published on 1 October 1850 with a daily circulation (including Sundays) of 1,000, and was sold by subscription for 26 batzen for three months. Its circulation soon grew nationwide, briefly rising to more than 10,000 during the Franco-Prussian War of 1870–71. By 1875, according to the conservative Intelligenzblatt, Der Bund was Switzerland's leading news medium.

It was initially intended to be a neutral, national newspaper modeled after the British newspaper The Times. But in the intensely polarized political and cultural environment of the period, the editors – Abraham Roth and Johann Karl Tscharner – soon took the side of the Liberals, then governing the federal state but in opposition to the majority Conservatives in the Canton of Bern. The newspaper notably focused on publishing the deliberations of the national parliament and government, to which it had unique connections: three Federal Councillors (Constant Fornerod, Stefano Franscini and Friedrich Frey-Herosé) regularly forwarded notes from cabinet meetings to the newspaper, and Fornerod even drew a 1,000-franc salary from the newspaper for this service.

In 1893, the newspaper introduced one of the first typesetting machines on the European continent, and in 1894 the newspaper helped in establishing the Schweizerische Depeschenagentur (SDA), still the country's leading press agency.

In 1897, a second daily edition was introduced, not to be abandoned until 1967.

== List of publishers and co-publishers ==
Until 1993, the newspaper was published by members of the Jent family:

- Louis Jent (1810–1867), publisher 1850–1867
- Sophie Jent-Reinert (1822–1907), publisher 1867–1881
- Adolf Jent (1846–1894), publisher 1874–1894
- Hermann Jent (1850–1915), publisher 1874–1915
- Fritz Pochon-Jent (1875–1950), publisher 1909–1950
- Alice Pochon-Jent (1881–1970), publisher 1950–1970
- Werner Hans Stuber (1930–2015), publisher 1961–1993
- Ringier (1993–1994)
- Neue Zürcher Zeitung (1995–2004)
- Espace Media (2004–2007)
- Tamedia (since 2007)
