= Alexander Ludwig von Muralt =

- Born: Alexander Ludwig von Muralt; 19 August 1903; Zurich, Switzerland
- Died: 28 May 1990 (aged 86); Arni, Switzerland
- Citizenship: Swiss
- Occupations: Physiologist, researcher
- Children: 3, including Charlotte
- Relatives: Michael von Graffenried (grandson)
- Awards: Marcel Benoist Prize

Academic background
- Education: University of Zurich

Alexander Ludwig von Muralt (19 August 1903 – 28 May 1990) was a Swiss physiologist and researcher who was primarily known for his studies of muscles and nerve signals working at Harvard University and the University of Bern. He received several honorary doctorates and was also a Marcel Benoist Prize recipient.

== Early life and education ==
Von Muralt was born 19 August 1903 in Zurich, Switzerland, the only son of Ludwig von Muralt (1869–1917) and American-born Florence von Muralt (née Watson; 1867–1933), both physicians who met working in psychiatry at Burghölzli, during their studies at the University of Zurich. His mother originally hailed from Philadelphia, Pennsylvania and moved to Switzerland to work under Eugen Bleuler. Despite his mother being born in the United States, Muralt did not hold U.S. citizenship.

Von Muralt's father was from a Patrician family that belonged to Swiss nobility. At the time of his death he was the director of a lung sanatorium in Davos, and died suddenly after being diagnosed from tuberculosis himself. After the death of his father, they left Davos and he was primarily raised in Zurich. He initially was interested in medicine but he also found physics and mathematics appealing, particularly being interested in lectures by Erwin Schrödinger. He completed his doctoral thesis at the University of Zurich in physics on a study of the limits of Hehl's law of glow discharge.

== Career ==
In 1928, von Muralt, was able to move to the United States, where he had received a Rockefeller grant, to research at Harvard Medical School. He worked on protein structure with Edwin J. Cohn. Using refraction experiments they tried to study actin and myosin structure.

He was offered a position at Harvard but he moved to the Kaiser Wilhelm Institute under Otto Meyerhof in Heidelberg. Here he completed an MD degree. Meyerhof and A.V. Hill had studied the formation of lactic acid from glycogen and in 1930 Einar Lundsgaard had shown muscle contractions without the production of lactic acid when treated with iodoacetate. Ludwig worked on using light scattering in muscles to study anaerobic contractions and received an MD summa cum laude, in 1932. In 1935 he moved to the University of Bern. He wrote a textbook Practical Physiology (1943). During World War II he joined the Swiss army and at the end of the war he had the rank of Colonel. He continued work in Bern with studies on nerve fibres. Along with Robert Stampfli and Andrew Huxley they recognized saltatory excitation. He wrote two books Signalibermittlung in Nerven (1946) and Neue Ergebnisse der Nervenphysiologie (1958). He received the Marcel Benoist prize in 1946 for his work on nerve signal transmission. He then became involved in the Swiss National Science Foundation founded in 1952 as well as directed the High Altitude Research Station at Jungfraujoch (3475 meters above sea level). He retired in 1968 but continued to be interested in research and was particularly interested in the studies on the neurons of squid done by Richard Keynes and Larry Cohen at Plymouth.

== Personal life ==
In 1927, von Muralt married Alice Victoire Baumann (born 1904), a daughter of Jacob Conrad Baumann (born 1866) and Alice Baumann (née Stockar; born 1877), both of Zurich. They had three daughters;

- Charlotte Aline "Lottie" von Muralt (1930–2013), ethnologist, author and philanthropist, married Charles von Graffenried, had three children.
- Regula von Muralt (1934–2007), married Foley, one daughter.
- Elisabeth von Muralt, married Indermühle, three children.

Von Muralt died 28 May 1990 in Zurich, Switzerland aged 96.
