= Cloud of Ash =

2015 Icelandic webseries

- Genre: Webseries
- Created by: Steindor Jonsson
- Starring: Atli Bollason & Brogan Davison
- Opening theme: "In Sight" by Berndsen
- Country of origin: Iceland
- Original language: English
- No. of seasons: 2
- No. of episodes: 12

Production
- Producers: Adalsteinn Stefansson, Gardar Stefansson, Steindor Jonsson
- Production location: Reykjavík, Iceland

Original release
- Network: YouTube
- Release: March 30 – September 21, 2015

Cloud of Ash is an English-language comedy webseries, produced and set in Reykjavík, Iceland. It stars Atli Bollason and Brogan Davison as disinterested employees in Iceland's booming tourism sector. Noted as the first-ever scripted Icelandic comedy webseries, Cloud of Ash debuted on 30 March 2015 and has run 12 episodes. Upon release, the series garnered interest in domestic and international media for its subject matter, particularly its portrayal of a German hipster tourist.

== Plot and production ==
The series was created and written by Steindor Jonsson and produced by Jonsson, Adalsteinn Stefansson and Gardar Stefansson. Individual episodes were directed by Gardar Stefansson, Petur Armannsson and Runar Ingi Einarsson. The intro was animated by Eric Linn. The theme song is "In Sight" by Berndsen.

Cloud of Ash follows Atli, a "hipster extrovert" and Brogan, a "grumpy introvert", who work in a Reykjavík tourist shop. The episodes have self-contained plot lines and mostly revolve around the main characters' interaction with tourists at work and in their free time.

The series, including its title, is inspired by Iceland's tourism boom, following the 2010 eruptions of Eyjafjallajökull. Actor Atli Bollason discussed the premise in an interview:

But these are interesting times in Reykjavík because the outsider’s gaze has never been as prominent as it is right now. I think this has a profound effect on not only how we perceive ourselves but how we behave as well. We are living, breathing stereotypes; super-conscious of the role we’re expected to play on the ‘famous’ Reykjavík scene and I think the series is partly playing with this new reality.

— Atli Bollason, Iceland Monitor

Each episode runs between 2 and 5 minutes. The first batch of episodes was released on 30 March 2015, containing 8 episodes. Another batch was released on 21 September 2015, containing 3 episodes. A bonus episode, breaking the regular format by featuring a video diary by a supporting character, "the German tourist", was released on 18 May 2015. The character, played by Asgeir Petur Thorvaldsson, sparked coverage in European media, most notably the German Süddeutsche Zeitung, the Swiss Der Bund and the French Courrier International, among others.

A year from its initial release, the episodes had over 200,000 views on YouTube.
