= Sei achtsam und teile =

Sei achtsam und teile (= Be aware and share, BAAS) is a non-profit and independent charity organization founded in Basel in 2015. In Switzerland, it is responsible for raising awareness and information on the situation in the Souda Refugee Camp, and has donated the Youth and Education Center Refugee Education Chios, thanks to donations donated in Switzerland. The work of the relief organization is supported by volunteers. President of the organization is the social worker Bastian Seelhofer, vice president is the health care specialist Anna Suter. The organization has 17 permanent employees and is based in Frenkendorf.

== History ==
The reactions to a donation call by the social worker Bastian Seelhofer led to the founding of an association and an aid mission on the Croatian-Hungarian border in September 2015. In autumn and winter 2015 the organization supported refugees in camps and on the borders of Hungary, Croatia, Slovenia and Serbia. The organization decided to be involved on the ground in order to meet the needs of the fugitives in the long term. In February 2016, for example, she established a presence on the Greek island of Chios, which is on the escape route to Europe. There, she provided refugees with food, medical first aid and emergency aid for arrivals on the coast.

The EU-Turkey Agreement of 18 March 2016 amended the needs of the refugees and the priorities of the relief organization: emergency aid for the transit journey gave way to the longer-term support of people who had to remain on the island. Because offers were missing the aid organization in May 2016 in the areas youth work and education for minors active. She founded the Refugee Education Chios Youth and Education Center, which consists of three facilities for young people and children supported by volunteers in June 2017.

BAAS was awarded the Reinacher Prize in March 2017.

In June 2017 the Refugee Education Chios educational project threatens to end, despite the fact that the humanitarian situation continues to worsen according to Seelhofer.

== Documentation ==
The TagesWoche reported at regular intervals on the activities of BAAS. A documentary film about the charity organization was published in February 2016 in Swiss program cinemas. The Schweizer Radio DRS and Al Jazeera reported on the school in Chios in July 2016.
