= YRU =

Swiss rock music band

- Origin: Bern, Switzerland
- Genres: Alternative, indie, psychedelic, rock
- Years active: 2006-present
- Labels: Unsigned
- Members: Sabrija Makolli (Vocals); Lars Uebersax (Hammond); Peter Ruzek (Guitar); Alper Akçöltekin (Bass/Vocals); Philipp Beyeler (Drums)
- Past members: Stefan Caduff (Vocals); Daniel Dummermuth (Guitar); Michael Trittibach (Guitar); Manuel Meier (Guitar); David Diston (Guitar); Davide Vincifora (Guitar); Christian Wenger (Bass); Rafael Costa (Bass)
- Website: http://www.yru.li

YRU (pronounced "why are you") is a Swiss rock band formed in 2006 by Philipp Beyeler (drums), Michael Trittibach (guitar), and Christian Wenger (bass), who had all grown up and already played together, decided to continue and start up a proper band. Soon Lars Uebersax (Hammond organ) joined the guys but they still needed a singer and another guitarist. Before the year was over they found their voice in Stefan Caduff and Daniel Dummermuth a friend of Lars joined them to be the lead guitarist. That is when they really started to make an impact in the Bern Switzerland area.

== History ==
In 2008 they released their first album Follow the Lights with seven tracks featuring "Song for Everyone" which was aired for over two years on the show Roboclip on SF zwei from the Swiss national channel Schweizer Fernsehen and also got showed on Swizz Mix on Viva. In 2009 they got voted to play at the famous Bierhübeli for the Waldbühne Contest of Gurtenfestival '09. Later that year YRU Daniel Dummermuth left the band but finished the recordings on the upcoming album and they found a new guitarist in Manuel Meier. In 2010 they released their first album Punkrock & Butterflies making its debut on iTunes. After the release, Christian Wenger left the band and Rafael Costa, a long-time friend of the band, replaced him. In 2016 the second album still a capitalist was released with David Diston on Guitar. Rafael Costa and David Diston left the band and were replaced with Alper Akçöltekin and Davide Vincifora who are playing on the third album New Beginning which was released in Spring 2019. The CD-Release-Party was held at de:Gaskessel_(Jugendzentrum) Bern together with the Band "Modern Day Heroes". During the tour, Covid19 broke out and the band lost momentum. Davide Vincifora left the band early 2021, founding member and lead singer Stefan Caduff early 2022. Peter Ruzek a long time friend of the drummer was asked to join the band as Guitarist in Summer 2022. Alper Akçöltekin began to sing the lead vocals. After a shared gig at the Süri Air 2023 Sabrija Makolli was asked to join YRU as additional lead singer. Currently they are working on new songs with addition of Swiss German songs.

=== Music style and influences ===
The band's sound is diverse and is a mix of 1970s sound elements such as the Hammond organ and modern approach of music. YRU cites its influences as The Doors, Pink Floyd, Deep Purple, Jimi Hendrix, Madrugada (band), Red Hot Chili Peppers, Ben Harper, Pearl Jam, Manic Street Preachers, Cake, Incubus (band), NOFX, Zero7 and Why?.

=== Press ===
Their video to "Song for Everyone" inspired by the Free Hugs Campaign was aired on SF zwei on the show Roboclip from November 2008 until March 2011 on the Swiss national channel SF zwei. It was introduced in October 2008 at the show Swizz Mix on Viva (TV station) YRU's debut radio broadcast was on Musiktipp on the national radio DRS 3 on 20 July 2009. And on other regional stations such as Neo1 which they also got interviewed.

The debut on-air radio interview was made by Berner Zeitung on 5 October 2009. First video interview was also at Berner Zeitung on 18 August 2010 which they interviewed the singer and the drummer.

== Discography ==
=== Albums ===
- Follow the Lights (2008)
- Punkrock & Butterflies (2010)
- still a capitalist (2016)
- New Beginning (2019)
