= Michael von Graffenried =

Swiss photographer

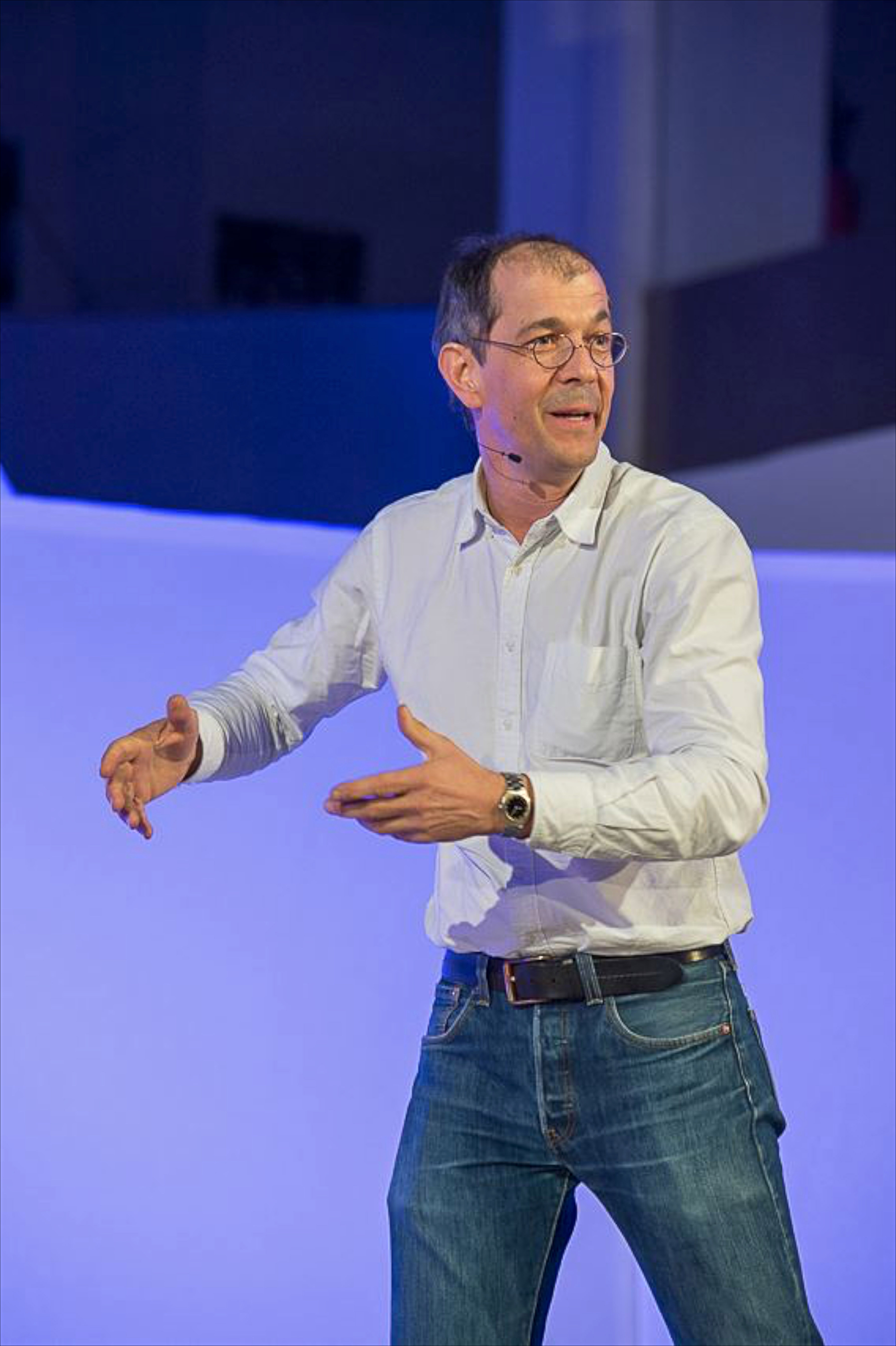
- Michael von Graffenried giving a TED Talk at the Museum of Modern Art MAMA in Algiers, 2014.
- Born: 7 May 1957 (age 68); Bern, Switzerland
- Known for: Photography
- Notable work: Inside Algeria
- Children: 2

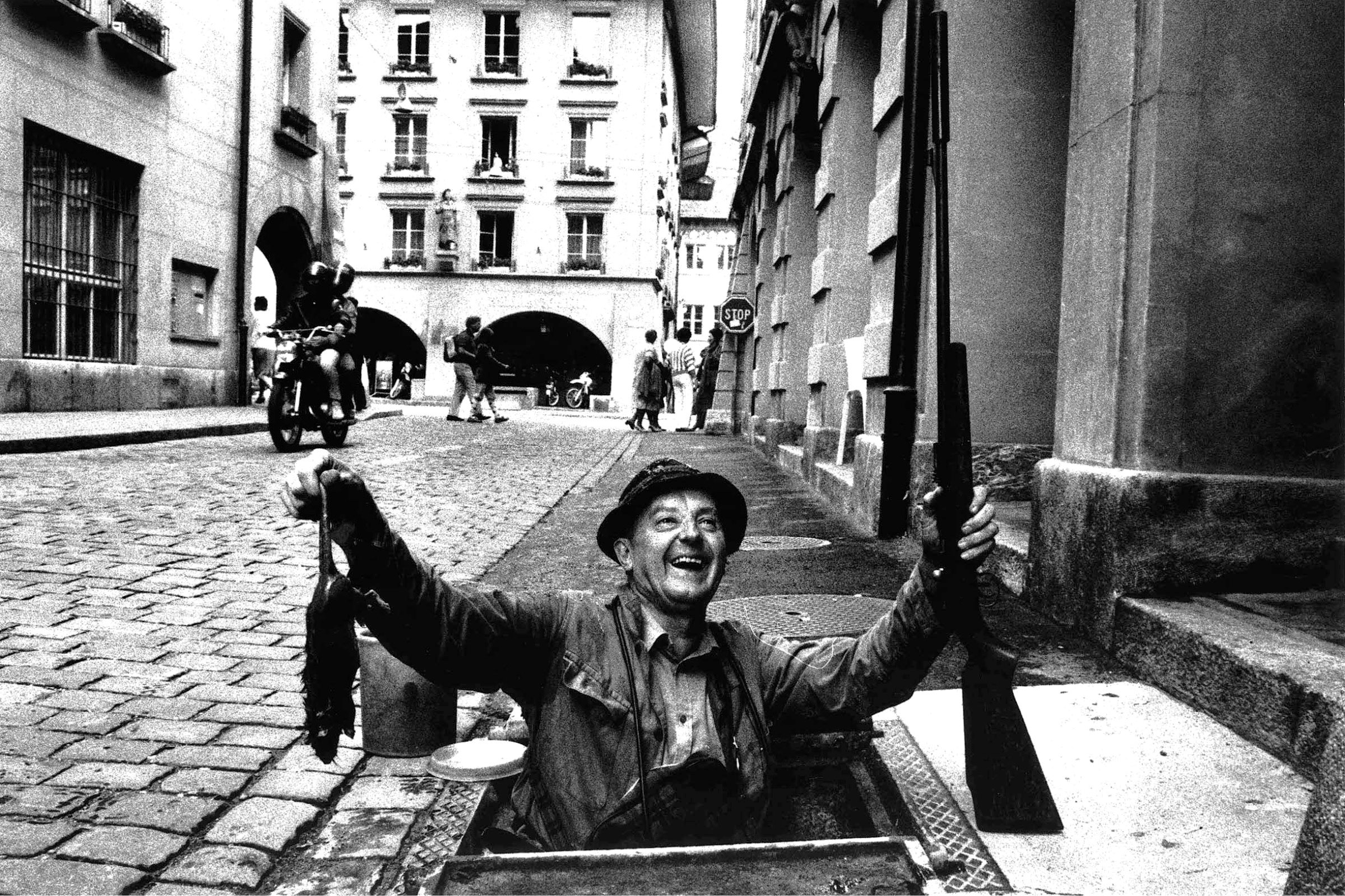
Rat Catcher, 1984, 12 × 16" / 30 × 40 cm

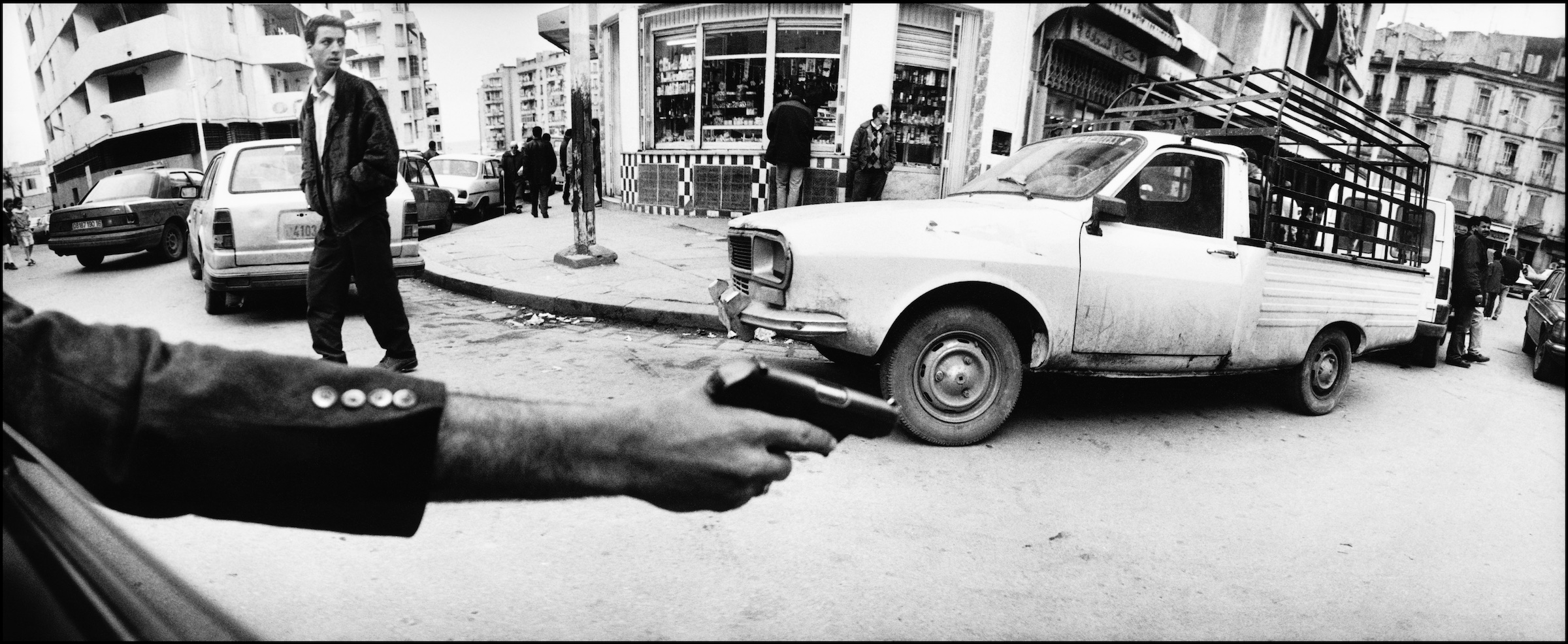
Inside Algeria, 1994, 43 × 20" / 110 × 50 cm

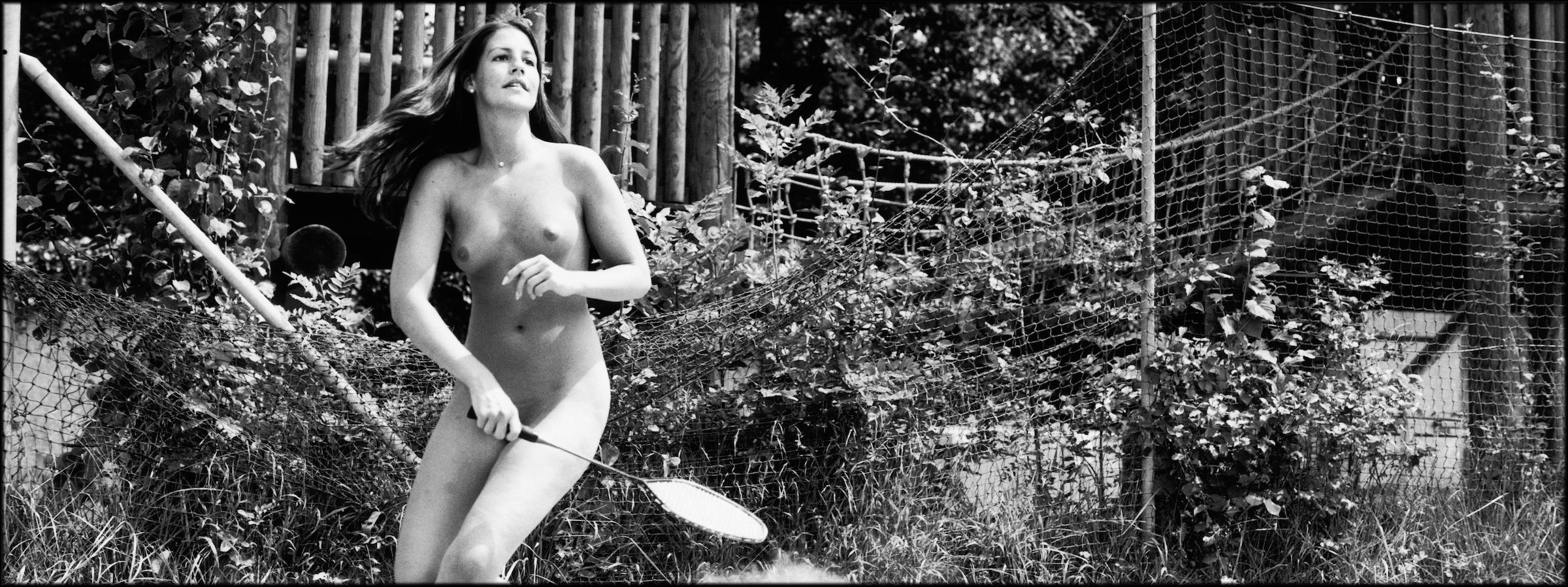
Naked in Paradise, 2001, 117 × 50" / 298 × 125 cm

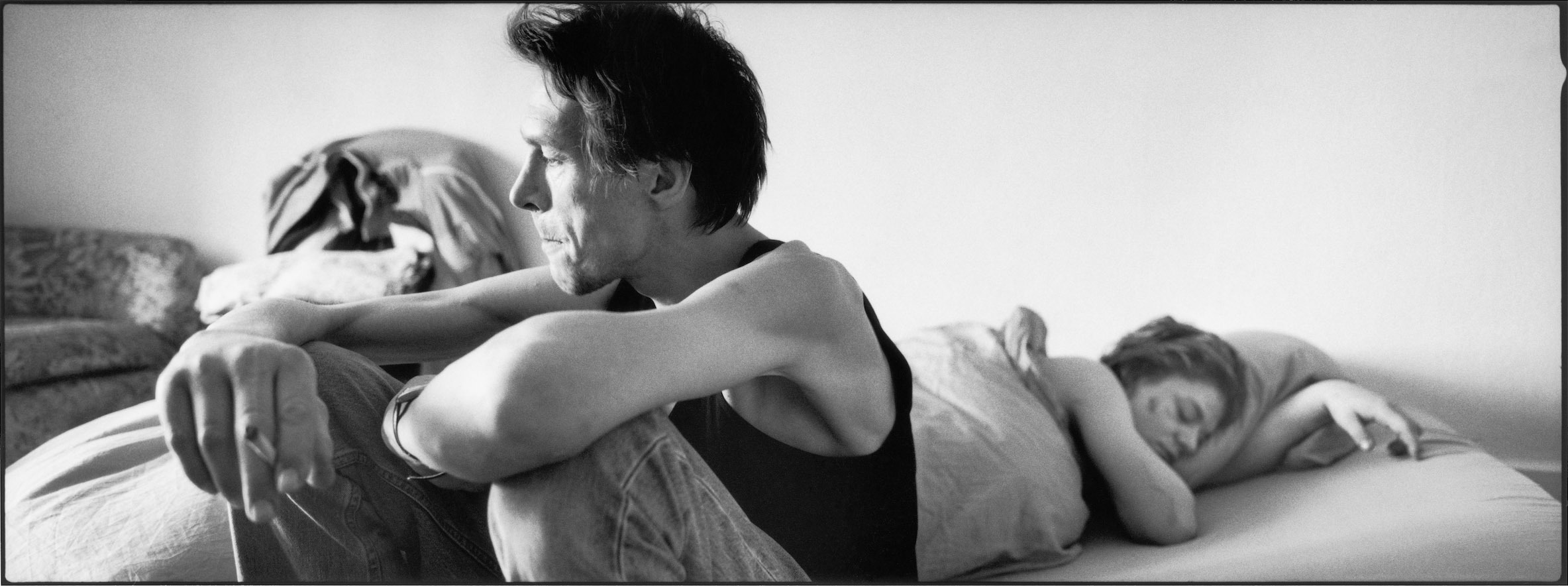
Cocainelove – Astrid et Pierre, 2004, 117 × 50" / 298 × 125 cm

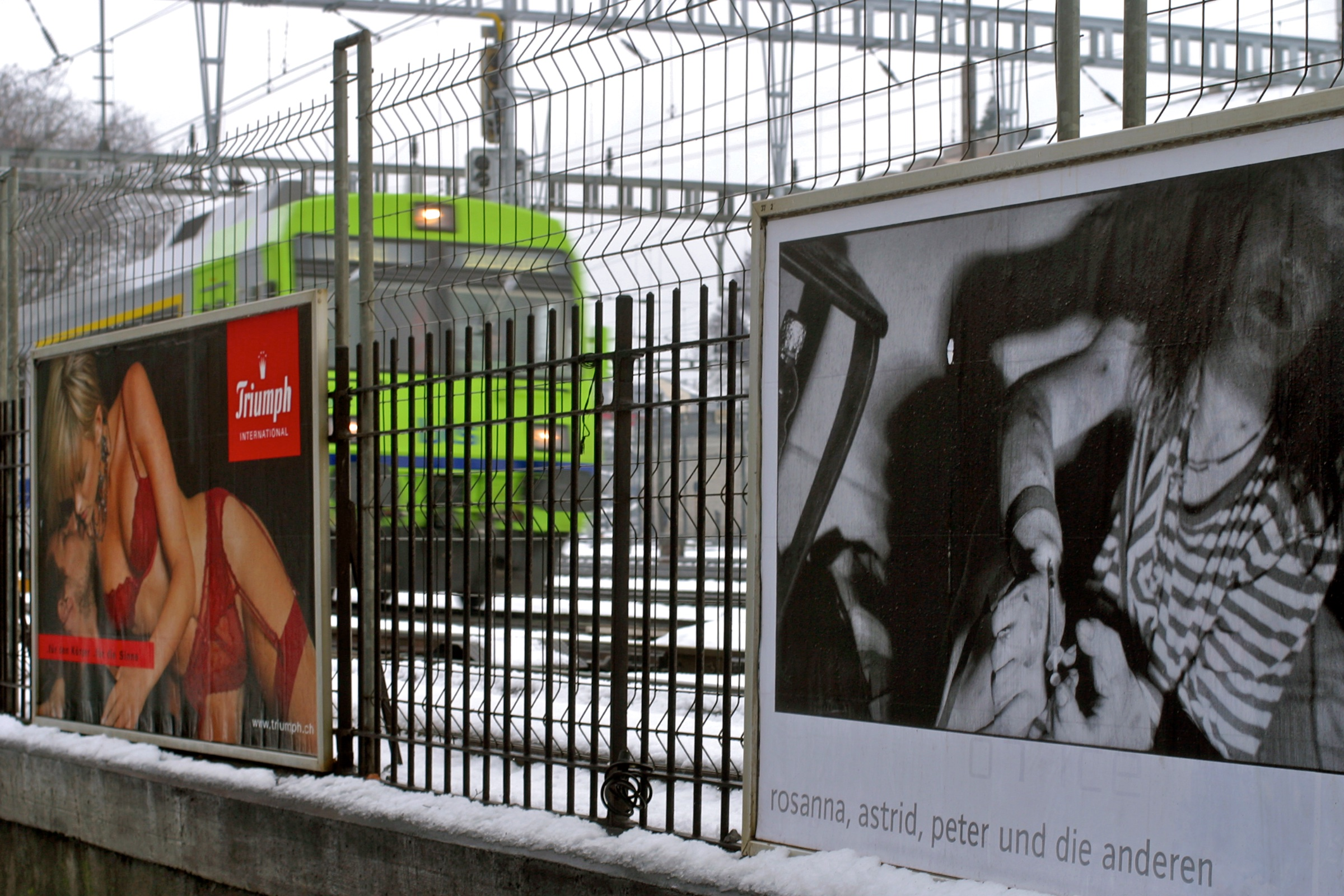
Public Billboard with Cocainelove, 2005 in Bern Switzerland

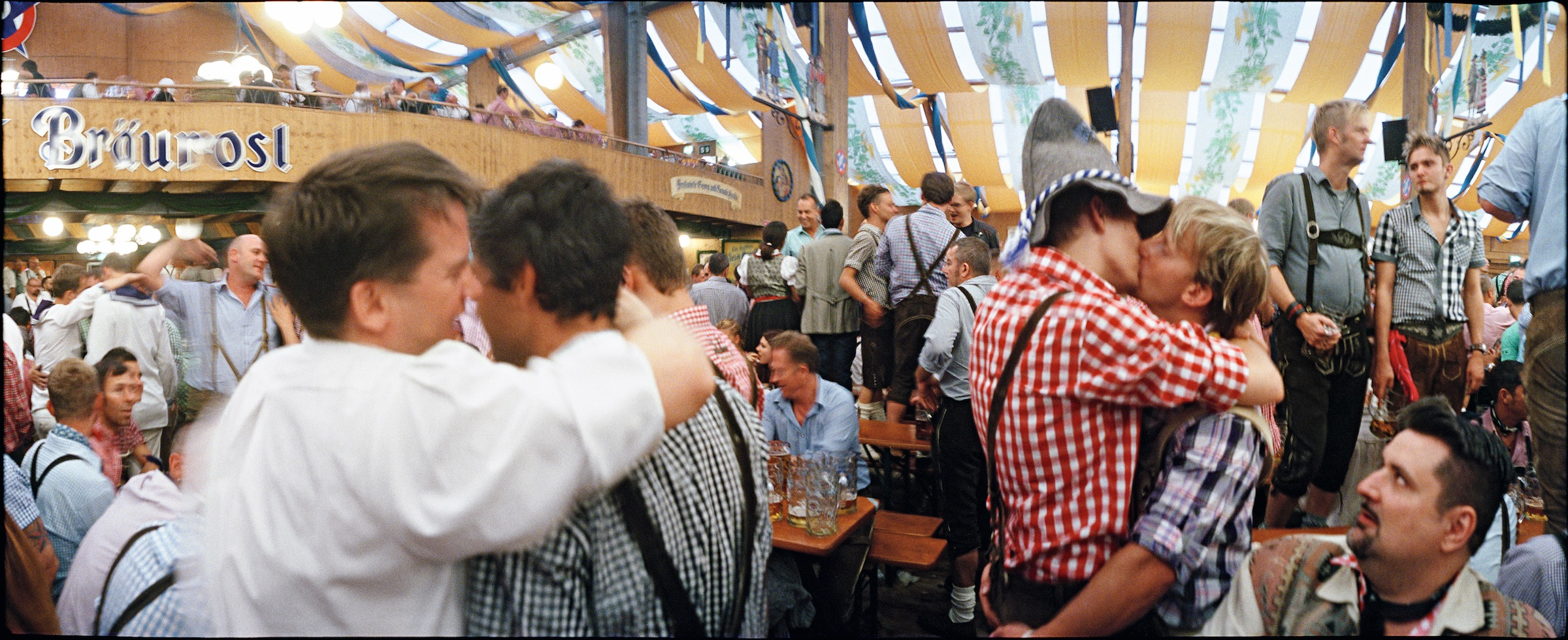
Bierfest, 2011, Lambda print, 113 × 50" / 288 × 125 cm

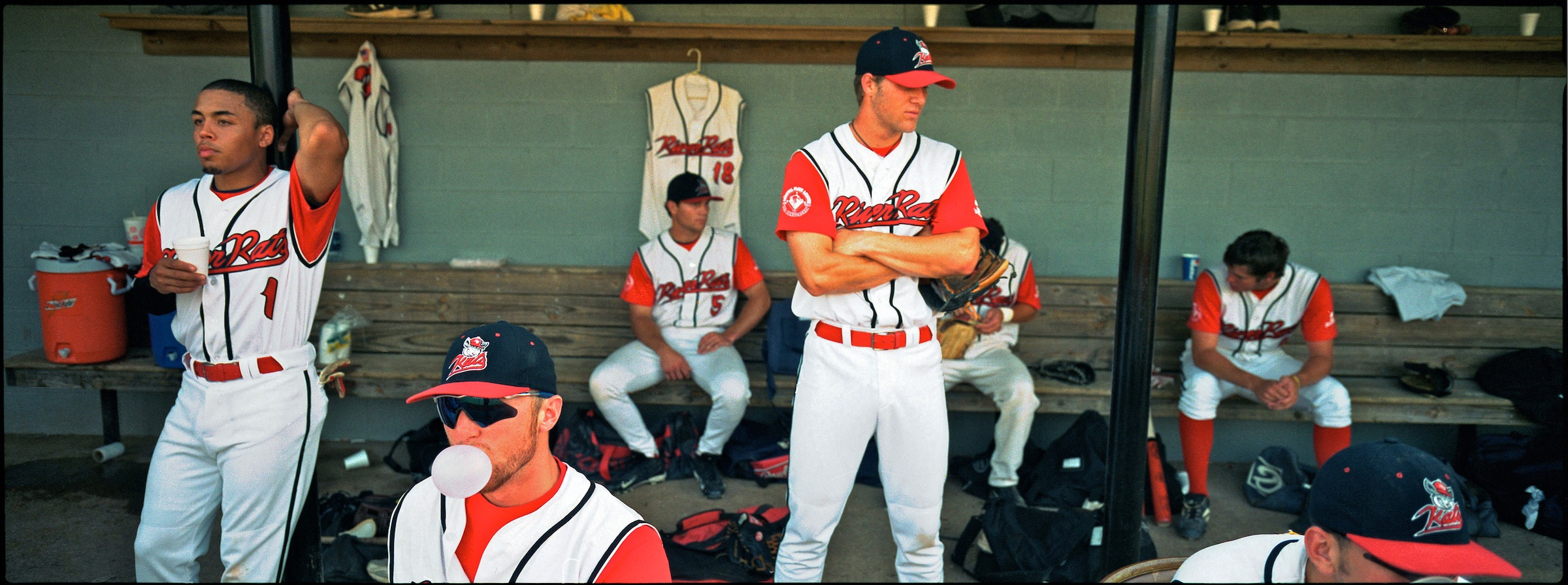
Our Town, 2006, Lambda print, 117 × 50" / 288 × 125 cm

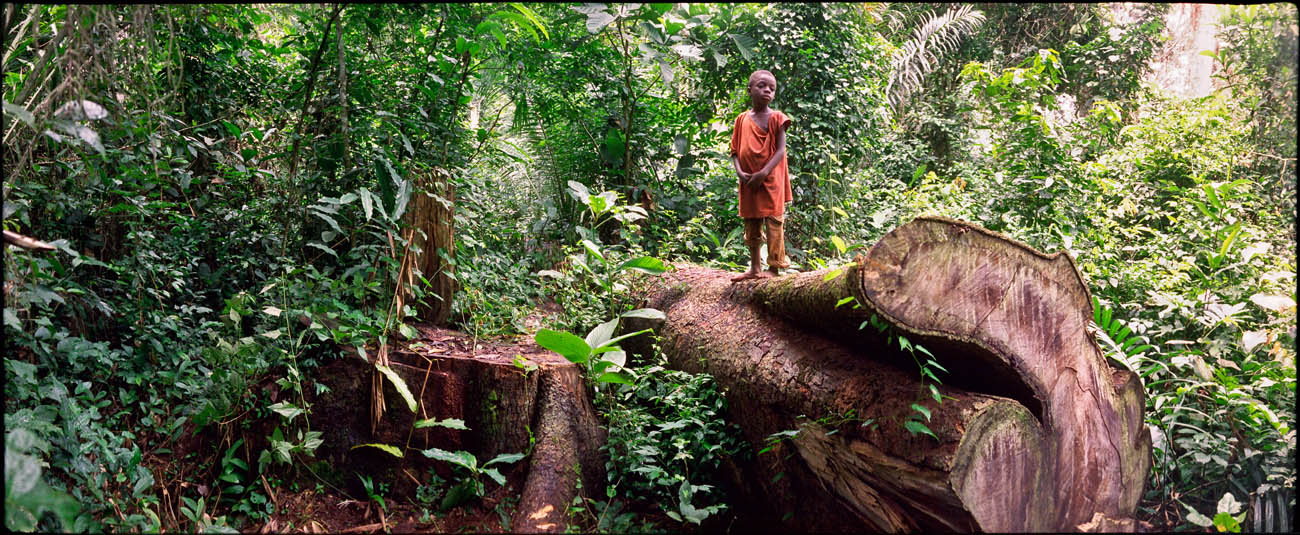
Baka Boy, 2009, Lambda print, 113 × 50" / 288 × 125 cm

Michael von Graffenried (born 1957) is a Swiss photographer primarily active in France, Switzerland and the United States.

In 1978, von Graffenried started working as a photojournalist, travelling the world for numerous publications. Today he works on long-term projects using different kinds of media to showcase his artwork, such as open-air campaigns on public billboards and films.

His work has appeared in numerous international magazines and newspapers, including The New York Times, Time, Newsweek, Life, Paris Match, Le Monde, GEO, Stern and El País. With his films, videos, photos, and also as a guest, he has contributed to many television programs in Europe. He has exhibited widely in Switzerland and France, as well as in New York City, Algiers, Hong Kong and Beirut.

== Early life and education ==
Von Graffenried was born 7 May 1957 in Bern, Switzerland, the third and youngest child, of Charles von Graffenried, and his first wife American-born Charlotte von Graffenried (née von Muralt. He has an older sister, Ursula Bindschedler (née von Graffenried; born 1953), and a younger brother Robert von Graffenried (born 1954). He also has three younger half-siblings from his fathers second marriage.

== Work ==
He first became known in Switzerland for work focused on his hometown, including the Swiss Parliament, where his pictures of members of parliament looking sleepy, or caught in unflattering poses, assured him a reputation for insolence. The American photography critic Vicki Goldberg wrote about his use of humor in The New York Times and drew comparisons with Robert Frank and René Burri.

It was his work on Algeria, which made his reputation internationally. For ten years, he regularly traveled the country, which was plagued by civil war, and took pictures with an old panoramic camera held at waist height, operating it without using the viewfinder. His panoramic work, which has become his signature, has been the subject of several books and an exhibition at La Villette in Paris in 1998, before being presented in Algiers in 2000. He also produced the movie War Without Images – Algeria, I Know That You Know, with the director Mohammed Soudani. The documentary film sees him go in search of Algerians he had photographed during the civil war. In 2002, the film was presented at the Locarno International Film Festival.

Von Graffenried originally worked for the printed press, where he was able to have strong control over the use of his pictures. To justify the trust placed in him by his photographic subjects and to maintain his independence and integrity, he has always refused to join a news agency or publishing company.

He then shifted to a more conceptual approach to his photography, erecting large format, panoramic versions of his work on billboards in major Swiss cities: CocaineLove on (illegal) drugs, and Eye on Africa (Cameroon). The curator and interviewer Hans-Ulrich Obrist commented on Graffenried's method of working with the old panoramic Widelux, saying that his body becomes the camera and that his photographs do not have an Inside or Outside anymore. The viewer is Immersed.

Graffenried does not hesitate to use his fame to express his political views. He was an outspoken supporter of the "NO" vote during the Swiss minaret referendum, the popular initiative approved by a majority of voters on 29 November 2009. The minaret ban is now part of the Constitution.

Between 2006 and 2021 he made a portrait of New Bern, a little town in North Carolina, USA which was founded by his ancestor Christoph von Graffenried. His series, Our Town, named after the American play by Thornton Wilder is a both a document of a community and a call for increased integration and understanding at a decisive moment in American history.

In 2014, he joined the team who created sept.info, a Swiss online news site. Here, he instigated the publication of a weekly printed magazine, cut in the exact shape of an iPad. This allowed readers to place the magazine inside their iPad, where they could then choose to either read their printed copy or the sept.info online content on screen. He was the art director of sept.info until 2015. Many of his photographer friends participated in this publishing experience.

== Personal life ==
Von Graffenried married Esther Woerdehoff (born 1957, a gallery director, with whom he has two daughters;

- Manon von Graffenried (born 1993)
- Meret von Graffenried (born 1998)

He resides in Bern, Switzerland.

== Awards ==
- 1989 World Press Photo award, Arts and Entertainment, Stories, 3rd prize, for his series Sowjet Artists in Moscow during the Perestroika.
- 2006 Legion of Honour Medal awarded by the Minister of Culture (France).
- 2010 Dr. Erich Salomon Award awarded by the German Society for Photography.

== Documentary films ==
- 2000 Algeria – War without images by Mohammed Soudani
- 2004 Michael von Graffenried – Photo Suisse (EN) by Andreas Hössli
- 2005 Cocainelove by mvg and Roland Lanz
- 2009 Shoreditch Stories by Peter Balzli
- 2009 Minaret in Bricklane London
- 2012 On the Edge by Mohammed Soudani
- 2014 mvgphoto Channel

== Publications ==
- 1989 Swiss image, Bern : Benteli, OCLC 23925554
- 1991 Swiss people, Le Mont-sur-Lausanne : J. Genoud, OCLC 80809652
- 1995 Sudan, a forgotten war, Bern : Benteli, OCLC 75557675
- 1997 Naked in Paradise, Stockport : Dewi Levis, ISBN 1-899235-85-X
- 1998 Inside Algeria, New York: Aperture, (Library of Congress Catalog Card Number: 98-85810)
- 1998 Algérie, photographies d'une guerre sans images, Paris : Hazan, OCLC 40760017
- 2005 The Eye of Switzerland : 15 years of Swiss Press Photo, Wabern-Bern : Benteli, OCLC 71255254
- 2005 Cocaine Love, Benteli, Wabern, OCLC 58602649
- 2009 Eye on Africa, Basel, Schwabe Verlag, ISBN 9783796525827
- 2010 Outing, Maison Européenne de la Photographie, Conversation avec Hans Ulrich Obrist à Londres
- 2014 Bierfest, Göttingen, Steidl, ISBN 9783869306803
- 2016 Changing Rio, Zurich, Offizin, OCLC 934152966
- 2021 Our Town, Göttingen, Steidl, ISBN 9783958298835

== Solo exhibitions ==
- 1998 Algérie, photographies d'une guerre sans images, Paris – Month of Photography, Pavillon Delouvrier, Parc de la Villette, Paris
- 1999 World Panorama, Fotomuseum Winterthur, Switzerland
- 2000 Algérie, photographies d'une guerre sans images, National Library El Hamma, Algiers
- 2002 Helveticum 02, Musée d'Art et d'Histoire (Neuchâtel), Switzerland
- 2003 Museum of Fine Arts Bern, Switzerland (Curated by Harald Szeemann)
- 2003 Michael von Graffenried – World Panorama, Library of the city of Bordeaux, France
- 2005 Rosanna, Astrid, Peter and the others, Swiss National Museum, Zurich
- 2007 Inside Cairo, On the rooftop in Downtown Cairo, photography installation, Egypt
- 2007 Our Town, Kornhausforum Museum Bern, Switzerland
- 2009 Eye on Africa, Zentrum Paul Klee, Bern, Switzerland
- 2010 Outing, Retrospective, Maison Européenne de la Photographie, Paris
- 2012 Inside Cairo, Parker's Box Gallery, Brooklyn NY
- 2012 On the Edge (on public billboards), Varanasi, India
- 2014 Bierfest, Esther Wordehoff Gallery, Paris

== Collections ==
Von Graffenried's photographs are held in the following permanent collections:

- Swiss Foundation for Photography, Winterthur, Switzerland
- Musée de l'Élysée, Lausanne, Switzerland
- Bibliothèque nationale de France, Paris
- Pilara Foundation, Pier 24 Photography, San Francisco, USA: 1 print (as of 22 October 2021)
