= Zürcher Unterländer =

Swiss daily newspaper

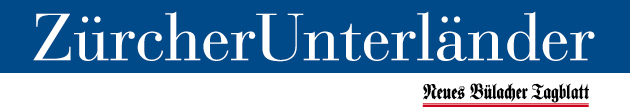
- Type: Daily newspaper
- Owner(s): Tamedia (TX Group)
- Founded: • 1850 (as Bülach-Dielsdorfer Wochen-Zeitung") • 1949 (name changed to Zürcher Unterländer)
- Language: German
- Headquarters: Bülach
- Country: Switzerland
- Circulation: 15,116 (as of March 2015)
- Website: zuonline.ch

Zürcher Unterländer, commonly shortened to ZUL, is a Swiss German-language daily newspaper, published in Bülach.

== History and profile ==
Founded in 1852, the newspaper has a leading position in the districts of Bülach and Dielsdorf. The Tamedia AG acquired in 2010 a minority stake, and ZUL was integrated in their Zürcher Regionalzeitungen division, claimed to be of compound of the Zürich regional newspapers that was established in 2011.

In 1966, the edition occurred 4,206, 18,657 in 1998 and in 2012 19,878 copies.

Zürcher Unterländer is the official publication media for the municipalities in the districts of Bülach and Dielsdorf.
