= Basler Zeitung =

Swiss German-language regional daily newspaper

- Type: Daily newspaper
- Owner(s): Tamedia (TX Group)
- Founded: 1977; 49 years ago
- Language: German
- Headquarters: Basel
- Country: Switzerland
- Sister newspapers: Baslerstab
- OCLC number: 183307820
- Website: baz.ch (in German)

Basler Zeitung (literally: "Basler Newspaper"), or BaZ, is a Swiss German-language regional daily newspaper, published in Basel.

== History and profile ==
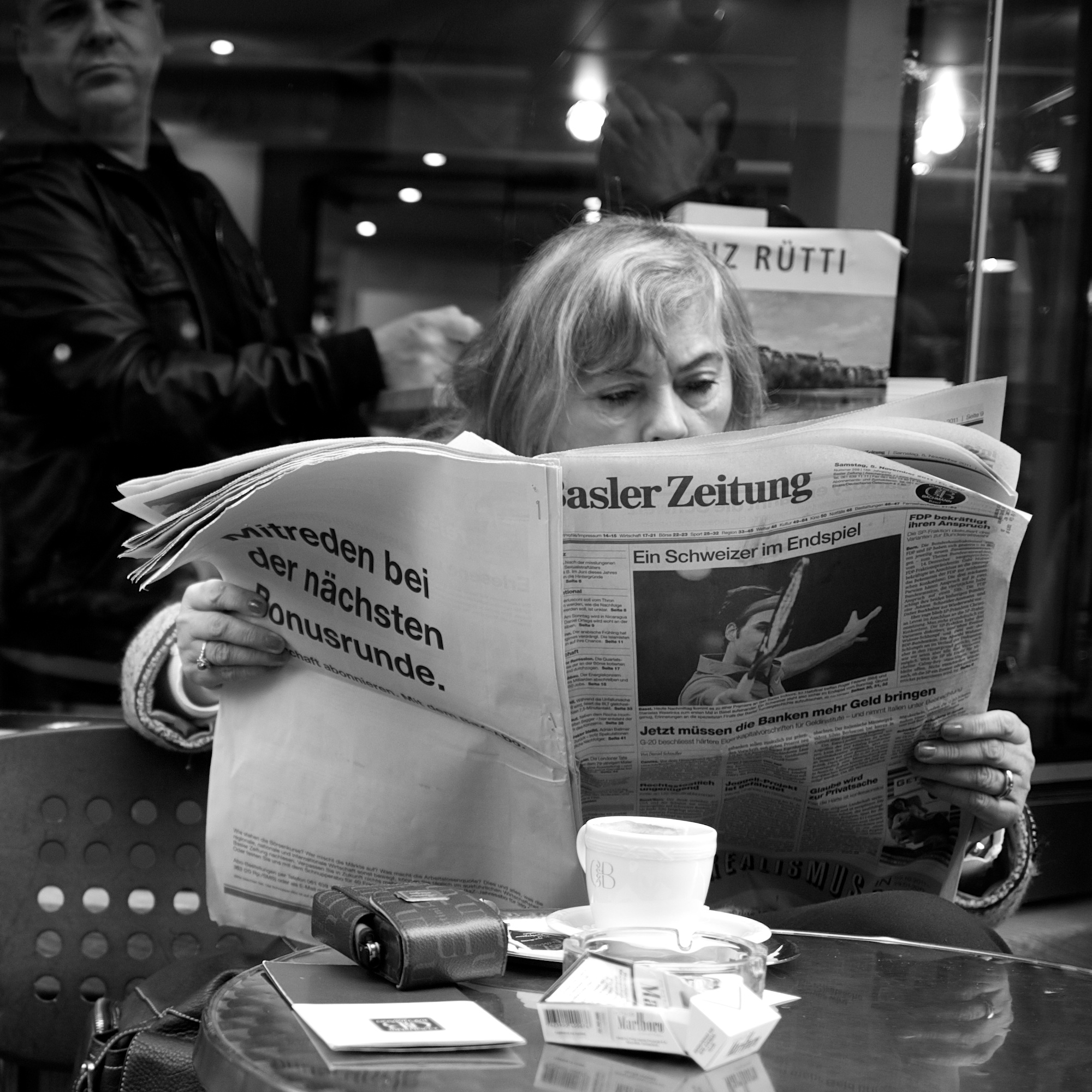
Coffeehouse in Basel (2011)

Basler Zeitung was created in 1977 through the merger of the Basler Nachrichten and the National-Zeitung. The paper has its headquarters in Basel and the Basel canton.

The newspaper is owned by the Basler Zeitung Medien which also publishes the free daily newspaper Baslerstab. The shareholders of Basler Zeitung are Tito Tettamanti (75%) and Martin Wagner (25%).

In 1997 Basler Zeitung had a circulation of 115,297 copies. The circulation of the paper was 104,000 copies in 2003. The 2006 circulation of the daily was 98,645 copies.

== General information ==
The weekday edition of Basler Zeitung is published in two bundles, cut in the traditional Swiss newspaper format of 320 × 475 mm: The first bundle is devoted to political events at home and abroad. In addition, there are topics from the economy, culture and the opinion page with letters to the editor. The second part covers regional news from the municipalities of Basel, Riehen and Bettingen, followed by reports from Baselland and Fricktal, and very rarely from Sundgau and Markgräflerland. In addition, sporting events are embedded here. Subscribers (not newsstand buyers) also receive the "Magazin" of the Zürcher "Tages-Anzeiger" which are both smaller Swiss journals as a supplement every Saturday. Until the beginning of the 21st century, a "large circulation" appeared each Friday and was distributed free of charge in the canton of Baselland, where the Basler Zeitung was in competition with the Basellandschaftliche Zeitung.

On 8 January 2012, the first issue of the Basler Zeitung am Sonntag (BaZ on Sundays for short) appeared. It had the same format and layout as the weekday edition, but comprised two extensive rather than four frets. Several editorial positions were created for it. On 24 February 2013, the last issue of the Sunday edition was published; since then, subscribers have received Tamedia's Sonntags Zeitung. In 2014, the Basler Zeitung launched the twice-weekly BaZ Kompakt as an alternative to the daily newspaper. Every Tuesday and Thursday, BaZ Kompakt provides information on important background topics in tabloid format. After only 14 months, however, newsstand sales of BaZ Kompakt were discontinued; since then, the newspaper has still been available by subscription or at the BaZ counter.

== Predecessor newspapers ==
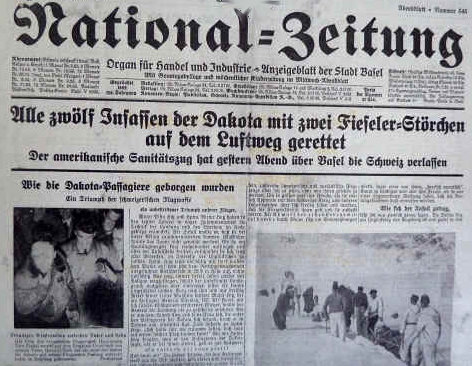
Title page of the "National Zeitung" (National journal)

=== National Newspaper ===
The first issue of the Swiss National-Zeitung was published in Basel in 1842 in opposition to the Ancien Régime. From 1877, the newspaper called itself only National-Zeitung (NZ). In 1945, it acquired a majority stake in the free newspaper Baslerstab.

In the German Reich, the National-Zeitung was banned from 1934 to 1945, as were the Neue Zürcher Zeitung and Der Bund in Bern. The ban was imposed in response to coverage of the so-called Röhm Putsch.

For a long time, the NZ, like the Basler Nachrichten, was a bourgeois newspaper until the early 1960s, when it broke with the radicals (today's FDP.Die Liberalen) and a socially critical left-liberal trend became apparent in the newspaper. This was particularly evident in the coverage of the Zurich Globus riot: In contrast to almost all other Swiss dailies, the NZ strove for a balanced portrayal of the youth riots, strongly criticized the police beatings ordered by the Zurich authorities, and solicited understanding for the rebelling youth. The events of 1968 not only shaped the view of the NZ articles, but also the political consciousness of some editors. The democratization discussed at the time achieved a restructuring of the editorial office: on 1 May 1970, the National-Zeitung became the first newspaper in Switzerland to receive an editorial statute that guaranteed the editorial board a say, for example, in the hiring, reassignment and dismissal of an editor and in publishing decisions of a journalistic and technical nature. "We don't have an editor-in-chief, and we don't need one," was the motto. However, the democratic structure became increasingly authoritarian.

The newspaper's business performance was unpleasant: in 1974, it suffered a major decline in advertising sales. Compared to the time before the then acute oil crisis, it sold thirty percent fewer ads. The publisher at the time, Hans-Rudolf Hagemann, stated, "The advertisement is the most profitable item we sell," and announced appropriate cost-cutting measures in June 1975. Among others, the following measures were implemented:

- The selling price of a newspaper issue was increased from 70 to 80 centimes.
- From now on, the National-Zeitung cooperated with the Basler Nachrichten for carrier services, the vehicle fleet, forwarding and the production of the stock exchange page.
- The newspaper's circulation was cut by another page.
- The fee budget was cut by ten percent.
- Three editors were laid off, and three picture editors were demoted to secretaries. Further dismissals followed.

Nevertheless, the National-Zeitung could not survive on its own; in the first major press merger in Switzerland, it merged with the Basler Nachrichten to form BaZ in 1977.

== "Dr glai Nazi" supplement ==
"Dr glai Nazi" ("The little Nazi") with the subtitle "D'Kinderbylag vo dr Nazi-Zyttig" (The children's section of the Nazi-journal) was a Wednesday supplement of the National-Zeitung for children. It appeared for the first time in 1926.

The name comes from the fact that the National-Zeitung was called "Nazi-Zyttig" (pronounced with a short A) in oral usage in Basel. The designation has nothing to do with Nazi in the sense of National Socialist.

== Basel Nachrichten, basel News ==
The Basler Nachrichten (BN) was founded in 1844 as the successor to the Avis-Blatt, founded in 1729, under the title Allgemeines Intelligenzblatt der Stadt Basel and was a liberal-conservative daily newspaper. In 1856 they changed their name to Basler Nachrichten aus der Schweiz und für die Schweiz (Basel news from Switzerland and for Switzerland) and a year later to Basler Nachrichten. (Basel News)From 1873 to 1902, the paper was in radical hands; the conservative forces of Basel founded the Allgemeine Schweizer Zeitung in its place until they could take over the Basler Nachrichten again. It was close to the banks: for a long time, the private banker Alfred E.Sarasin presided over its board of directors. At the same time, he was also president of the Swiss Bankers Association.

Between 1912 and 1924, and between 1944 and 1972, the Basler Nachrichten appeared twice daily, in a morning and an evening edition. As a rule, the former was a news paper, the latter a commentary and opinion paper, with the orientation of the newspaper usually resembling that of the Liberal Party. The paper established itself as one of the leading daily newspapers in German-speaking Switzerland. In 1976, Basler Nachrichten had a circulation of 34,000 copies.

Like the National-Zeitung, the Basler Nachrichten struggled with financial problems. The BN was considered the paper of the Basel Daig (Word used to describe the upper class of Basel) and was supported by the business community with seven-figure sums annually. The BN wrote for a minor part of the population that was perceived as elitist and was losing importance because of the strong growth of the city of Basel: most of the new inhabitants did not identify with the way people in Basel are thinking of the BN.

== Switzerland's first major newspaper merger ==
On 16 November 1976, the public learned about Switzerland's first major newspaper merger: the National-Zeitung and the Basler Nachrichten were merged to form the Basler Zeitung as of 31 January 1977. The merger is generally referred to as a "merger", but in economic terms it was a sale: National-Zeitung AG took over the assets and liabilities of Basler Berichtshaus AG (the publishing house of Basler Nachrichten), which was then liquidated. The previously competing publishers justified the merger as follows:

"This forward-looking decision, reached after thorough negotiations and in mutual agreement, is based on the realization that only a united effort can solve the increasingly difficult economic and technical problems of the press and at the same time offer readers a daily newspaper that meets their high demands of today."

- quoted from Max Jäggi: This is how the "National-Zeitung" went bust.

Nothing of the "in-depth negotiations" leaked to the public: although various events in the past (for example, the joint stock exchange page from 1975) were retroactively interpreted as indications of a merger, the publishers denied such plans until the end. Even some NZ employees only learned of the pending merger from the newspaper. BN employees were informed at a meeting called at short notice. The merger was denounced as an impoverishment of the culture of opinion. Supporters of the BN saw it as a betrayal of liberalism, while sympathizers of the NZ accused the Basel business circles of having gotten rid of a critical, inconvenient newspaper in such a simple way. The two newspapers had also defined themselves by their differences. From now on, the new editorial team, made up of members of both media houses, had to write together for a broader readership in a so-called forum newspaper. A forum newspaper is a newspaper which tries to showcase a broader diversity in opinions.

For the editors of the NZ, the merger greatly diminished the right of co-determination that the editorial staff of the BN did not have. The merger violated the editorial statutes of both newspapers. The publishing house and the board of directors, which was dominated by representatives of the chemical industry and the banks, granted themselves more power. In addition to the loss of more than a hundred jobs, the unions noted, "Once again it becomes clear that freedom of the press in the 'free' market is mere freedom of the publishers." The fight against the restructuring of the NZ editorial staff and the protest against the merger marked the first time in Switzerland that journalists organized themselves on a larger scale into a union, the Swiss Journalists Union (SJU). This also involved joining forces with the technical staff.

== Reorientation 2010/2011 ==
On 8 February 2010, the Hagemann publishing family and Publigroupe (a marketing group for media and publicity companies situated in Lausanne) announced the sale of their shares in Basler Zeitung Medien to investors Tito Tettamanti and Martin Wagner. At the end of September 2010, the media group's holding company moved its registered office from Basel to Zug, where it was renamed "Watt Capital Holding AG". It is domiciled in the office of the Zug lawyer Ernst Brandenberg, whose son Manuel Brandenberg, who works there, is a leading Zug SVP politician and a member of the board of directors of the SVP- and AUNS-affiliated newspaper "Schweizerzeit".

On 14 November 2010, it became known that the owners of the Basler Zeitung media group had given a consultancy mandate to the management consultancy and financing company "Robinvest AG", whose board of directors consists of Christoph Blocher and his daughter Rahel Blocher. Blocher was providing purely industrial consulting services through "Robinvest AG" and was not influencing newspaper content. After Blocher's consulting mandate became known, 1600 subscriptions were cancelled. The editorial staff also rebelled. There were protests.

On 24 November 2010, it became known that the owners Tettamanti/Wagner had sold the "Basler Zeitung Medien" with immediate effect and 100 percent to the Basel entrepreneur and Crossair founder Moritz Suter. Suter became chairman of the board of directors. He subsequently terminated Christoph Blocher's consultancy mandate. The holding company's headquarters were moved back from Zug to Basel. Markus Somm was confirmed as editor-in-chief.

Moritz Suter announced in an interview in the NZZ am Sonntag that he had spent only about one million francs on the purchase of the holding company. The investors who now owned the "Basler Nachrichten und National Zeitung AG" (Basler Zeitung Medien), which had considerably more substance, remained unknown. Markus Somm hired new editors, such as Eugen Sorg from the weekly magazine Die Weltwoche. On 21 February 2011, Basler Zeitung announced the dismissal of six journalists, the majority of whom were progressive critics.

The complaints of the Association for Critical Media Use (February 2011), the initiative "Rettet Basel!" (meaning: save basel!) (March 2011) and by a Basler Zeitung journalist (May 2011) to the Swiss Press Council regarding the paper's opaque financing were upheld on 13 July 2011: The economic control of the newspaper by Moritz Suter was officially challenged by the Swiss Press Council and a corresponding disclosure was demanded.

On 14 April 2011, the "Foundation for Media Diversity" was founded in response to the events at Basler Zeitung. Its goal is to set up a competing product to the Basler Zeitung. The new newspaper, called TagesWoche, appeared for the first time on 28 October 2011.

On 12 December 2011, Moritz Suter ceded his shares to Rahel Blocher, thus ending his attempt to reorganize Basler Zeitung. He stepped down as chairman of the board of directors as well as publisher. Media saw the sale to Christoph Blocher's daughter Rahel as proof that Basler Zeitung had been controlled by Christoph Blocher for some time, despite his denials in the past.

However, as early as 14 December 2011, Basler Zeitung was taken over by the newly founded "Media diversity Holding" based in the canton of Zug. The Ticino financier Tito Tettamanti again became the majority shareholder. National Councilor Filippo Leutenegger became the new president of the Basler Zeitung. The commitment of Rahel and Christoph Blocher changed to a deficit guarantee provided by Christoph Blocher to the industrial divisions of the Basel media group.

However, media critical of BaZ and the "Rettet Basel!" which means "save Basel" campaign, also critical of BaZ, continued to assume a strong influence of Blocher and SVP confidants.

"Media diversity Holding" is not to be confused with the "foundation for Media diversity" the supporting foundation of TagesWoche, which competes with BaZ. According to Tito Tettamanti, the choice of name is purely coincidental.

== Restructuring and reorientation in 2014 ==
Since the end of June 2014, Markus Somm, Christoph Blocher and Rolf Bollmann each owned one third of the Basler Zeitung. They took over the shares from "MedienVielfalt Holding". The parties agreed not to disclose the purchase price. Since then, the media company's activities have focused solely on publishing Basler Zeitung and BaZ Kompakt. All previous activities have been sold or discontinued. The editorial team and publishing house have also been restructured and streamlined.

== Takeover by Tamedia in 2018 ==
On 10 March 2018, it was announced that Basler Zeitung would be sold to the Zurich-based Tamedia Group. On 18 April 2018, Tamedia confirmed this. In return, Tamedia's 65% stake in the "Tagblatt der Stadt Zürich" (a Zurich-based journal) and the free newspapers Furttaler and Rümlanger (each previously 100% Tamedia) and, in French-speaking Switzerland, the stakes in Genève Home Information (GHI) and Lausanne Cités (each previously 50% Tamedia) would be sold to the previous owner of Basler Zeitung, Christoph Blocher's Zeitungshaus AG. The editor-in-chief of the Basler Zeitung, Markus Somm, will continue to lead the newspaper as editor-in-chief for six months after the takeover by Tamedia. After that, he will take a sabbatical and work as a writer for Tamedia.

On 11 October 2018, the Competition Commission approved the takeover. On 29 October 2018, Tamedia announced the closing of the transaction. As a result, Basler Zeitung will take over the "Mantel" (This is referring to the part of a regional journal that reports on non-regional events) for national topics from Tamedia and report on all local, regional and cantonal events, including business, culture as well as sports, with an independent editorial team from Basel. The reorganization is expected to be completed by summer 2019. Marcel Rohr, the former head of sports at Basler Zeitung, has been appointed as the new editor-in-chief and Markus Somm's successor from January 2019. He announced that he wanted to "depoliticize BaZ to a certain extent."

== editors-in-chief ==
- 1977–1978 Alfred Peter (Was previous chairman of editorial office at the National-Zeitung) and Oskar Reck (Previously editor in chief for the Basler Nachrichten)
- 1978–1983 Gerd H. Padel
- 1983–2003 Hans-Peter Platz
- 2004–2006 Ivo Bachmann
- 2007–2010 Matthias Geering
- 2010–2018 Markus Somm
- seit 2019 Marcel Rohr
