= Von Graffenried Holding Ltd. =

Swiss corporate group

- Type: Private
- Industry: Financial Services
- Founded: 1933; 93 years ago
- AUM: $4–5 billion
- Number of employees: 300 (2026)

Von Graffenried Holding Ltd. (officially von Graffenried Holding AG) is a Swiss privately held corporate group of a private bank, notary and legal services as well as real estate brokerage, based in Bern, Switzerland.

Established in 1933 by Hermann Rudolf von Graffenried, initially as a law office and trust administration, his son Charles von Graffenried turned it into a diversified group which entailed obtaining a banking license from FINMA in 1979.
