= Charlotte von Graffenried =

Swiss author (1930–2013)

Curator of the Bern Historical Museum
- In office 1984–1992

Personal details
- Born: Charlotte Aline von Muralt; 9 April 1930 Boston, Massachusetts, U.S.
- Died: 18 September 2013 (aged 83) Bern, Switzerland
- Spouse: Charles von Graffenried (m. 1951, divorced)
- Children: 3, including Michael
- Occupation: Ethnologist, author, philanthropist

Charlotte Aline von Graffenried (née von Muralt; 9 April 1930 – 18 September 2013) was an American-born Swiss ethnologist, author and philanthropist who served as curator of the Bern Historical Museum. She was the wife of Charles von Graffenried and mother of Michael von Graffenried.

== Early life and education ==
Von Graffenried was born Charlotte Aline von Muralt on 9 April 1930 in Boston, Massachusetts, the oldest of three daughters, to Alexander Ludwig von Muralt, a physiologist and researcher, and Alice Victoire von Muralt (née Baumann), both originally from Zurich. Her sisters were; Regula Foley (née von Muralt; 1934–2007) and Elisabeth Indermühle (née von Muralt).

Her paternal grandparents were both physicians, her grandmother hailing from Philadelphia. Her father, who belonged to a Patrician family who was part of the Swiss nobility, came to the U.S. in 1928 to research Actomyosin at Harvard University. Her father was offered a position as professor in biochemistry at Harvard, but he declined and returned to Switzerland, with his young family at the beginning of the 1930s. She was raised there and completed her studies in the 1950s in ethnology, prehistory and religion.
