= Doodle (website) =

Swiss online calendar tool

- Screenshot
- Available in: 5 languages
- Headquarters: Zürich
- Key people: Christian Fielitz (CEO)
- Website: doodle.com
- Registration: Not required
- Current status: Active
- Written in: JavaScript (through JSF)

Doodle is an online calendar tool for time management and coordinating meetings. It allows users to schedule and make arrangements collaboratively, among other features. Doodle is available on desktop and mobile platforms. Founded in 2007, the company is headquartered in Zürich and has offices in Berlin, Belgrade, Atlanta and New York City.

== History ==
Doodle was founded in Zürich, Switzerland by ETH Zurich students Michael Näf and Paul Sevinç in 2007. Näf came up with the idea of creating a scheduling tool after experiencing difficulty coordinating time for dinner with his friends.

Swiss media giant TX Group purchased a stake in the company in 2011, which was increased to 100 percent in 2014.

Doodle acquired Meekan in 2016. Meekan was a chatbot developed in Israel that used artificial intelligence and natural language processing to schedule meetings. Doodle has since begun to integrate this technology into their products. Meekan subsequently shut down in 2019.

The company rebranded in 2022 and launched a redesigned website.

In May 2025, Christian Fielitz was appointed as the new CEO of Doodle, succeeding Renato Profico.

== Features ==
Doodle is freemium software with paid and unpaid tiers of services and features. Its core features include the ability to coordinate meetings and schedules through a poll system, which does not require user registration for basic functionality. Users are asked to determine the best time and date to meet via poll. The organizer then chooses the time that suits everyone and the meeting is booked in the user's calendar.

Meeting coordinators (administrators) receive e-mail alerts for votes and comments. Registration is required to have this function. Users can create booking pages to allow customers to schedule appointments.

Paid plans provide access to additional features such as unlimited booking pages and 1:1s, single sign-on, customizable branding, activity reports and onboarding. Paid subscribers also do not experience any advertisements.

Doodle integrates with external scheduling and workflow management platforms such as Google Calendar, Yahoo Calendar, Microsoft Outlook, and Apple iCal. These can be used with Doodle to track dates. Google Maps may also be used to share the location of the event. In November 2018, Doodle 1:1 was launched, allowing users to schedule one-on-one meetings.

During the rise of remote work during COVID-19, Doodle added integration with virtual meeting platforms such as Zoom and Microsoft Teams. It also integrates with workflow applications such as Zapier.

=== Mobile application ===
Doodle released its Android and iOS apps in 2014. Users can create, coordinate and respond to polls via mobile apps and are not required to register for some features.

== Usage ==
Doodle is used by individuals, businesses, corporations and schools, in over 200 countries. A 2013 study by Harvard University noted, that "Doodle's uptake was highly supported by word-of-mouth communication". In 2014, they passed the 20 million monthly user benchmarks. In 2016, Doodle was used by more than 180 million unique users around the world. It had over 30 million monthly users as of 2022.

== Reception ==
Doodle was included on TechRadar's list of the "Best scheduling apps of 2023". Its desktop and Android versions were both given positive reviews in PCMag, and the software received an Editors' Choice award from the magazine.

The tool has received several awards, including the Open Source Awards, and the Best of Swiss Web Awards.

== See also ==
- Digital calendar
- Reminder software
- Personal information manager
