= Carl Helfrich =

Carl Helfrich (13 August 1906 – 31 May 1960) was a German journalist and resistance fighter.

In the mid-1920s, Helfrich studied in Heidelberg University, where he belonged to liberal and socialist student circles. He studied physics, but soon turned to philosophy and received his doctorate in 1935 under the Catholic moral philosopher Theodor Steinbüchel in Giessen. In 1936, he began his journalistic career in Frankfurt.

In the autumn of 1939, he met Ilse Stöbe, with whom he began a relationship. Through Stöbe's mediation, he obtained a position in the Information Department of the Foreign Office, where Rudolf von Scheliha, was head of the division. On September 12, 1942, he was arrested along with Stöbe. Helfrich was not indicted by the Reichskriegsgericht, but was deported to the Sachsenhausen and then Mauthausen concentration camps. In his will, he inherited Ilse Stöbe's assets, which had been confiscated by the court, consisting primarily of real estate and shares in newspapers and publishing houses in Switzerland.

After liberation from the Mauthausen concentration camp, he returned to Berlin in 1945. From November 12, 1945, he became editor-in-chief of the first Berlin evening newspaper after the end of the war, Der Kurier, which was published three times a week. He became a member a of the Socialist Unity Party and became editor of the Association of Persecutees of the Nazi Regime's main organ Unser Appell (later named Die Tat).

In the 1952, he left the GDR for the West, where he became deputy editor-in-chief of Hessischer Rundfunk. In the Federal Republic, he was monitored by the Federal Office for the Protection of the Constitution. He died of lung cancer on May 31, 1960.
