= Charles von Graffenried =

Swiss baron, attorney and banker

Baron Charles von Graffenried
- Born: Karl Edmund von Graffenried; 19 July 1925; Bern, Switzerland
- Died: 10 July 2012 (aged 86); Worb, Switzerland
- Other name: Charles de Graffenried
- Education: University of Bern
- Occupations: Attorney, banker, publisher
- Known for: Leading Von Graffenried Holding Ltd.
- Spouses: Charlotte von Muralt (m. 1951, divorced) Christine Spycher (m. 1970, divorced)
- Children: 6, including Michael

Baron Karl Edmund von Graffenried colloquially Charles von Graffenried (19 July 1925 – 10 July 2012) was a Swiss baron, attorney, banker and publisher. He was the founder of Espace Media (which owned Berner Zeitung) and the von Graffenried Holding (law firm, private bank and real estate). In 2011, his net worth was estimated at $395 million.

== Early life and education ==
Von Graffenried was born 19 July 1925 in Bern, Switzerland, the second of three sons, to Hermann Rudolf von Graffenried (1895–1976), notary public, and Elisabeth Margaretha de Panchaud (de Bottens) (1899–1974). His brothers were; Rudolf "Berchtold" von Graffenried (1923–2007) and Daniel Christoph von Graffenried (1931–2016).

He was the offspring of an old Bernese Patrician family that belonged to Swiss nobility. The oldest male in line has traditionally borne the title of Baron. He is a direct descendant of Christopher von Graffenried, 1st Baron of Bernberg. His mother hailed from the Genevan Panchaud de Bottens family. He was raised in Bern and studied law at the University of Bern. There he belonged to the Zähringia Bernensis fraternity and ultimately became an attorney and notary public.

== Career ==
In 1933, Graffenrieds father became a self-employed attorney and notary public, in Bern. During the 1950s, Charles gradually took-over the office and turned it into a diversified company, which ultimately became von Graffenried Holding, which now operates three main divisions, private bank (licensed by FINMA since 1979), law firm as well as real estate and fiduciary services. In 1979, Graffenried merged the newspapers Berner Nachrichten and Berner Tagblatt to form Berner Zeitung. In 2001, he turned the publishing company Berner Tagblatt Medien AG into Espace Media which he ultimately sold to Tamedia (presently TX Group) in 2007, of which he also became a board member.

== Personal life ==
In 1951, von Graffenried firstly married American-born Charlotte von Muralt (1930–2013), an ethnologist, daughter of Alexander Ludwig von Muralt, a Swiss physiologist and researcher at Harvard University, under Edwin Cohn and with John T. Edsall, and Alice Victoire von Muralt (née Baumann). They had three children;

- Ursula von Graffenried (born 1953), married Georges Bindschedler, an attorney. They had five children.
- Robert von Graffenried (born 1954)
- Michael von Graffenried (born 1958), married to Esther Woerdehoff (born 1958), two daughters.

He secondly married to Christine von Graffenried, his former secretary. They also have three children;

- Nicole von Graffenried (born 1972), married Stephan Herren, two children.
- Ariane von Graffenried (born 1978), married Martin Bieri, no issue.
- Caroline von Graffenried (born 1985), married to Martin Eggel, one daughter.

Von Graffenried died on 10 July 2012 aged 86. In 1985, Graffenried purchased New Worb Castle, where he has resided until his death.
