= TagesWoche =

- Type: Online newspaper (daily); printed weekly newspaper
- Owner: Neue Medien Basel AG
- Editor-in-chief: Dani Winter
- Staff writers: 17
- Founded: 28 October 2011; 14 years ago
- Language: German
- Headquarters: Basel, Basel-Stadt, Switzerland
- Country: Switzerland
- OCLC number: 762131879
- Website: tageswoche.ch (in German)

TagesWoche is a Swiss German-language online newspaper, with a weekly Friday printed edition, published in Basel, Switzerland by Neue Medien Basel AG.

== History ==
The newspaper's first edition appeared on 28 October 2011. It was created in reaction to the events surrounding Basler Zeitung, the traditional daily newspaper of Basel, which had financial problems and was finally sold in November 2010.

Its editors-in-chief were Urs Buess and Remo Leupin, who led a staff of seventeen people, many of whom were formerly journalists at Basler Zeitung. On 17 May 2013, a new editor-in-chief was appointed: Dani Winter.
