= Thurgauer Zeitung =

German language daily newspaper in Switzerland

- Type: Daily newspaper
- Owner: CH Media
- Founded: 1798; 228 years ago
- Language: German
- Headquarters: St. Gallen
- Country: Switzerland
- Website: www.thurgauerzeitung.ch

Thurgauer Zeitung is a Swiss daily newspaper published in Frauenfeld, Switzerland. Founded in 1798 it is one of the oldest newspapers still in circulation.

== History and profile ==
Thurgauer Zeitung was established in 1798. The publisher of the paper was Thurgauer Medien AG until October 2005 when Tamedia acquired the daily. Tamedia sold the paper to FPH Freie Presse Holding AG, a subsidiary of NZZ Media Group, in April 2010. Until that date the paper was published by Huber & Co. AG, a subsidiary of Tamedia. CH Media which has been a joint venture of NZZ Media Group since 2018 is the owner of Thurgauer Zeitung.

Thurgauer Zeitung serves the canton of Thurgau. Its headquarters was in Frauenfeld, and later it moved to St. Gallen. As of 2013 the paper was part of Newsnet, a platform of daily newspapers in Switzerland.

In 1967 Thurgauer Zeitung had a circulation of 18,000 copies. It sold 31,879 copies in 1997.
