= Sowjet =

German communist publication (1919–1922)

Sowjet (Unser Weg)
- Editor: Paul Levi
- Categories: Communism
- Frequency: Monthly
- First issue: 1 July 1919; 107 years ago
- Final issue: 1922; 104 years ago
- Country: Weimar Republic
- Based in: Berlin
- Language: German

Sowjet (Soviet in German) was a German monthly communist publication, edited by Paul Levi, printed in Berlin. The first issue was published on 1 July 1919. Following Levi's expulsion from the Communist Party of Germany, the journal, from 1 July 1921, changed its orientation and was henceforth published under the name of Unser Weg ('Our Way' in German). By the end of 1922 it ceased publication.

Among its contributors were Henriette Roland-Holst, Paul Frölich, Adolf Maslow, Fritz Geyer, and others.
