= Berner Zeitung =

Swiss German-language daily newspaper

- Type: Daily newspaper
- Owner(s): Tamedia (TX Group)
- Editor-in-chief: Simon Bärtschi
- Founded: 3 January 1979; 47 years ago
- Language: German
- Headquarters: Bern
- Country: Switzerland
- Circulation: 91 645 (2025)
- ISSN: 1660-685X
- OCLC number: 605915334
- Website: www.bernerzeitung.ch (in German)

Berner Zeitung (literally: "Journal of Bern"), also branded as BZ, is a Swiss German-language daily newspaper, published by Tamedia, itself owned by TX Group, in Bern.

== History and profile ==
Berner Zeitung was first issued on 3 January 1979. Four different papers led to the creation of the also called BZ: The Intelligenzblatt (1834), which was renamed Berner Tagblatt in 1888; The Emmenthaler Nachrichten (1883), the weekly newspaper of Emmenthal (1844) and the Neue Berner Zeitung (1919). When the Emmenthaler Blatt and the Neue Berner Zeitung were merged in 1973, Berner Zeitung was created. This paper merged with the daily news (former Emmenthaler Nachrichten) in 1977 creating the Berner Nachrichten, which was first released on 3 January 1979.

The first editor-in-chief was Peter Schindler who was in charge between 1979 and 1982. His successors were Urs P. Gasche (1982–1985), Ronald Roggen (1985–1986), Beat Hurni (1987–1996) and Andreas Z'Graggen (1996–2005). Between 2006 and 2009 Markus Eisenhut und Michael Hug co-edited the paper until Eisenhut took over another paper called Tages-Anzeiger. Its publisher was Charles von Graffenried until his death on 4 July 2012. The paper is based in Bern and serves in the Espace Mittelland region and in the canton of Bern.

In December 2011, Espace Media announced that they were going to merge the Splitausgabe Oberaargau and the Langenthaler Tagblatt. The first issue of the BZ Langenthaler Tagblatt was published on 2 July 2012. The newspaper also publishes local editions in Thun (Thuner Tagblatt), Bernese Oberland (Berner Oberländer), and Solothurn (Solothurner Tagblatt).

== Circulation ==
In 1997 Berner Zeitung had a circulation of 134,153 copies. The circulation of the paper was 163,000 copies in 2003. In 2005 its circulation was 196,000 copies. The 2006 circulation of the paper was 215,707 copies. In 2008 it was the third most read newspaper in the country with a circulation of 213,000 copies. The circulation of the paper was 208,694 copies in 2009.

In 2010 Berner Zeitung had a circulation of 181,705 copies. With a daily distribution of 174,162 copies in 2012, the newspaper was one of the largest daily newspapers in Switzerland and the leading newspaper in the Bern Canton.
