= TX Group =

Largest media company in Switzerland

TX Group AG
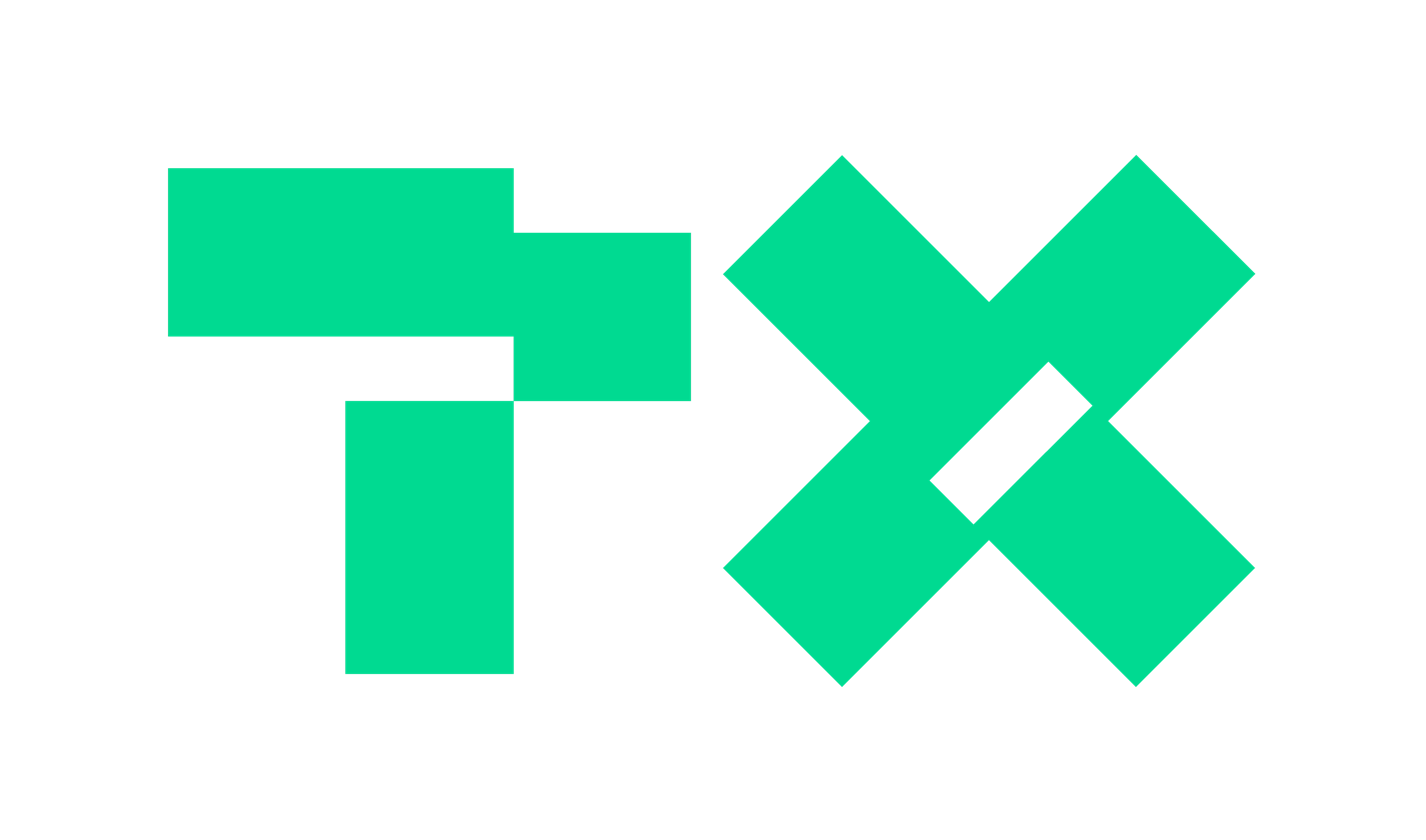
- Type: Public
- Traded as: SIX: TXGN
- Industry: Media
- Founded: 1893; 133 years ago
- Headquarters: Zurich, Switzerland
- Revenue: ▲CHF 1064 million (2015)
- Number of employees: 3,700
- Website: www.tx.group

TX Group AG (formerly Tamedia AG) is a media company headquartered in Zurich, Switzerland. Through a portfolio of daily and weekly newspapers, magazines and digital platforms, as well as own printing facilities, it is the largest media group in the country. Since 2000, Tamedia has been listed on the Swiss Stock Exchange.

On January 1, 2020, Tamedia was renamed to TX Group AG. Aside from group management functions, TX Group has four operating companies: TX Markets, Goldbach, 20 Minuten, and Tamedia.

== Marketshare ==
In 2011, it was the biggest player in the Swiss press market, controlling a 41% market share, which rose up to 68% in French-speaking Romandie. Its main competitors are NZZ Mediengruppe, Ringier, and CH Media.

== Holdings ==
=== Publishing ===
Tamedia owns a wide range of daily and weekly newspapers and magazines in different languages. One of Tamedia's most important publications is the Tages-Anzeiger, a daily newspaper based in Zurich. Tamedia also owns the weekly SonntagsZeitung, the free national newspaper 20 Minuten/20 Minutes, the free Tagblatt der Stadt Zürich, the weekly financial newspaper Finanz und Wirtschaft, the women's magazine Annabelle, the family magazine Schweizer Familie, the television supplement TV täglich, and the daily newspapers Thurgauer Zeitung and Zürichsee-Zeitung.

Further publications of Tamedia are:

- Newspapers: 20 Minuten, 20 minuti, 24 heures, Bernerbär, Berner Oberländer, Berner Zeitung, BZ Langenthaler Tagblatt, Der Bund, Der Landbote, Furttaler, GHI Genève Home Information, Journal de Morges, Lausanne Cités, Le Matin, Le Matin Dimanche, Rümlanger, Sihltaler, Thalwiler Anzeiger, Thuner Tagblatt, Tribune de Genève, Zürcher Unterländer, Zürichsee-Zeitung, Züritipp, L'Essentiel (in cooperation with publisher Editpress in Luxembourg), MetroXpress (Denmark)
- Magazines: 20 Minuten Friday, Bilan, Encore, Das Magazin, Femina, Guide TV, Tribune des Arts, Télétop Matin

=== Television ===
Between 2001 and 2011, the company also owned several local channels such as TeleZüri, Radio 24 (Switzerland), and Radio Basilisk. Following the takeover of Edipresse's Swiss operations, Tamedia sold its radio and television channels in 2011.

=== Other ventures ===
Besides its publishing segments, the media group Tamedia owns a digital portfolio with different online platforms.

In December 2018, Tamedia invested on Monito, a comparison website for international money transfer services.

==== News ====
Tamedia is the leading participant of Newsnet, a joint venture of the Basler Zeitung as well as the Tamedia-owned newspapers BZ Berner Zeitung, Tages-Anzeiger, Der Bund, Le Matin, Tribune de Genève and 24 heures. Newsnet's editorial staff produces news content for these newspapers' web portals. In 2015, the media group introduced the 12-App (#12) which presents the day's top stories from 21 editorial teams within Tamedia. And with 20 Minuten, Tamedia owns the biggest online newssite with the most unique clients in Switzerland.

==== Digital Holdings ====
- Acquisitions: autoricardo.ch, car4you, Doodle, homegate.ch, hommages.ch, Olmero & renovero.ch, ricardo.ch, Starticket, Trendsales, tutti.ch
- Participations: Book A Tiger, JobCloud AG, local.ch & search.ch, moneypark.ch, Tradono, Zattoo, Lykke AG, Monito.com, Car For You

== Headquarters ==
Its Zurich headquarters, completed in 2013, was designed by Japanese architect Shigeru Ban. Consisting of seven stories and 10,120 square metres (108,900 sq ft), the building uses timber as its main structural system, visible through its large glass windows.
