= List of political disinformation website campaigns =

The following is a list of websites, separated by country and sub-categorized by region or disinformation campaign, that have both been considered by journalists and researchers as distributing false news - or otherwise participating in disinformation - and have been designated by journalists and researchers as likely being linked to political actors.

== List ==
=== Algeria ===
The following websites are linked to an Algerian marketing/public relations firm, Ayam Agency. They are related to a network of Facebook pages and accounts removed in 2021 for coordinated inauthentic behavior, which was part of a campaign that Graphika described as "a multi-year cross-platform effort to advance the interests of Algerian President Abdelmadjid Tebboune".

Name	Domain	Status	Notes	Sources
All About Algeria	allaboutalgeria.com			
La Gazette d'Algérie	lagazettedalgerie.com			

=== Argentina ===
Name	Domain	Status	Notes	Sources
La Derecha Diario	derechadiario.com.ar		A 2022 analysis by Graphika found that the site had spread climate change denialism and had a wide geographical distribution of content on Spanish-speaking communities on Twitter. Owned by Fernando Cerimedo, the digital communications chief of Javier Milei, who had also worked on the campaign of Jair Bolsonaro.	

=== Austria ===
Name	Domain	Status	Notes	Sources
Report24	report24.news		Linked to the Freedom Party of Austria. Spread anti-vaccine misinformation and falsely claimed that over 1,000 cities planned to enforce bans on meat to combat climate change. A 2022 analysis by ProPublica found many advertisements that had been placed by Google, which were removed upon contact by ProPublica. Alongside Wochenblick, was accused by Correctiv of attempting to interfere in the 2021 German federal election.	

=== Bosnia and Herzegovina ===
Name	Domain	Status	Notes	Sources
ATV	atvbl.rs		Accused by the United States Department of the Treasury of being closely linked to Milorad Dodik. Spread Bosnian genocide denial, unproven cures for COVID-19 and false claims about NATO troop deployment in Ukraine. A 2022 analysis by ProPublica found many advertisements that had been placed by Google, which were removed upon contact by ProPublica.	

=== Brazil ===
Name	Domain	Status	Notes	Sources
Ceticismo Político	ceticismopolitico.org		Associated with MBL.	
Diário Nacional	odiarionacional.com		Imposter news portal site in Brazil that is associated with MBL.	
Diário Nacional	odiarionacional.org		Imposter news portal site in Brazil that is associated with MBL.	
Jornal do País				
Jornalivre	jornalivre.com		Associated with MBL. Banned from Facebook in 2018 due to what Facebook stated to be coordinated inauthentic behavior, "sowing division and spreading misinformation". Accused of harassing journalists in Brazil who contradict their claims, as well as the electoral prosecutor José Carlos Bonilha. Contained a script used for cryptocurrency mining.	
Jornalivre	jornalivre.org		Associated with MBL. Banned from Facebook in 2018 due to what Facebook stated to be coordinated inauthentic behavior, "sowing division and spreading misinformation". Accused of harassing journalists in Brazil who contradict their claims, as well as the electoral prosecutor José Carlos Bonilha. Contained a script used for cryptocurrency mining.	

=== Canada ===
Name	Domain	Status	Notes	Sources
LifeSiteNews	lifesitenews.com		Founded by the Canadian political lobbyist organization Campaign Life Coalition.	

=== Central African Republic ===
The following websites are related to a network of Facebook pages and accounts removed in 2021 for coordinated inauthentic behavior. They are linked to a pseudonymous individual that is suspected of being sponsored by the government of Faustin-Archange Touadéra and/or advisors from Russia.

Name	Domain	Status	Notes	Sources
Le Potentiel d'Afrique	lepotentieldafrique.net			
lafrique.info	lafrique.info			
Alternanceafricaine.org	Alternanceafricaine.org			
ong-lcdaf.org	ong-lcdaf.org			
paixetstabilite.org	paixetstabilite.org			
afriqueengagee.com	afriqueengagee.com			
afriqueactualite.info	afriqueactualite.info			
Lepanafricanisme.info	Lepanafricanisme.info			
miroirdafrique.info	miroirdafrique.info			
lemondeactualite.info	lemondeactualite.info			
leuropeafrique.info	leuropeafrique.info			
loccident.info	loccident.info			
lavoixdafrique.info	lavoixdafrique.info			
lanouvelleduconti-nent.info	lanouvelleduconti-nent.info			
lemondeenvrai.net	lemondeenvrai.net			
lereveilafricain.info	lereveilafricain.info			

=== Colombia ===
Name	Domain	Status	Notes	Sources
Pluralidad Z	pluralidadz.com		A 2020 investigation by La Silla Vacía found that this website was part of a media ecosystem whose editorial line served Gustavo Petro's political interests by presenting misleading news with the aim of turning public opinion against the political right and center. The Associated Press, ColombiaCheck, and Infobae have labeled news stories on Pluralidad Z as false, with ColombiaCheck warning that this website mass-disseminates disinformation.	

=== Denmark ===
Name	Domain	Status	Notes	Sources
24NYT	24nyt.dk		Founded by Jeppe Juhl, a candidate for the New Right party. Banned from Facebook in 2019 due to what Facebook stated to be coordinated inauthentic behavior, reportedly likely referring to purchasing social media interactions (likes) on its Facebook page. Such practices are potentially illegal under the Danish Marketing Practices Act. Academics have accused the site of misleading framing, unsourced claims, and presenting opinion as news.	

=== Ecuador ===
Name	Domain	Status	Notes	Sources
La Voz	lavoz.co		Related to a network of Facebook pages and accounts removed in 2020 for coordinated inauthentic behavior. Linked to Estraterra, a Canadian-based Ecuadorian marketing firm that was co-founded by a former government employee of Rafael Correa's government.	
Latam Post	latampost.online		Related to a network of Facebook pages and accounts removed in 2020 for coordinated inauthentic behavior. Linked to Estraterra, a Canadian-based Ecuadorian marketing firm that was co-founded by a former government employee of Rafael Correa's government. Published the same content as Semanario La Region. Missing domain registration name.	
Semanario la Región	elsemanario.online		Related to a network of Facebook pages and accounts removed in 2020 for coordinated inauthentic behavior. Linked to Estraterra, a Canadian-based Ecuadorian marketing firm that was co-founded by a former government employee of Rafael Correa's government. Published the same content as Latam Post. Missing domain registration name.	

=== Egypt ===
Name	Domain	Status	Notes	Sources
Alyamania News	alyamanianews.com		Spreads "anti-Turkish content". Part of a network of website domains shared on Twitter posts from a state-sponsored disinformation campaign from Egypt and the United Arab Emirates. Linked to one or more digital marketing firms based in Egypt: DotDev and/or NewWaves. Related social media posts and accounts were removed and shut down by Facebook and Twitter between 2019 and 2020 over coordinated inauthentic behavior.	
freeiranrevolution.com	freeiranrevolution.com		Spreads "anti-[Iranian]-regime content". Part of a network of website domains shared on Twitter posts from a state-sponsored disinformation campaign from Egypt and the United Arab Emirates. Linked to one or more digital marketing firms based in Egypt: DotDev and/or NewWaves. Related social media posts and accounts were removed and shut down by Facebook and Twitter between 2019 and 2020 over coordinated inauthentic behavior.	
Killed In Turkey	killedinturkey.com		Posted the same content as Turkey Leaks. Copied its content from Biten Hayatlar, including the group's name and logo in its social media posts. Anonymously registered website whose construction appeared to be unfinished. Part of a network of social media posts and accounts that was removed by Facebook in 2021 over coordinated inauthentic behavior. Linked to Egyptian marketing firm Bee Interactive, which Graphika described as "[illustrating] the role commercial marketing firms play in political influence campaigns".	
Masr Times	masrtimes.com		Part of a network of social media posts and accounts that was removed by Facebook in 2021 over coordinated inauthentic behavior. Linked to Egyptian marketing firm Bee Interactive, which Graphika described as "[illustrating] the role commercial marketing firms play in political influence campaigns".	
Turkey Leaks	turkeyleaks.com		Posted the same content as Killed in Turkey. Part of a network of social media posts and accounts that was removed by Facebook in 2021 over coordinated inauthentic behavior. Linked to Egyptian marketing firm Bee Interactive, which Graphika described as "[illustrating] the role commercial marketing firms play in political influence campaigns".	

=== France ===
Name	Domain	Status	Notes	Sources
Contre-Info	contre-info.com		Spread false claim that the French government approved euthanasia during the COVID-19 pandemic. Affiliated with the group French Renewal.	
coupsfrancs.com	coupsfrancs.com		Described by Graphika as "a conspiracy-minded website". Part of an influence operation attributed to individuals in the French military that battled a Russian-influence operation for the Central African Republic. Both networks were taken down by Facebook in 2020 for coordinated inauthentic behavior.	
La Gauche m'a tuer	lagauchematuer.fr		Founded by Mike Borowski, an associate of Christian Vanneste and a former activist for Union for a Popular Movement. Spread false information about immigration, Marlène Schiappa, Emmanuel Macron, the 2017 French presidential election, Kev Adams, the Notre-Dame fire, and other topics. Spread a satirical claim from Nordpresse as fact.	

=== Germany ===
Name	Domain	Status	Notes	Sources
Freie Welt	freiewelt.net		Run by the husband of Beatrix von Storch. Spread false claims about vaccines and a wheat shortage in Ukraine. A 2022 analysis by ProPublica found advertisements that had been placed by Google.	

=== Guinea ===
Name	Domain	Status	Notes	Sources
224Minutes	224minutes.net		Linked to the Rally of the Guinean People.	

=== India ===
==== Indian Chronicles ====
Indian Chronicles, dubbed by the EU Disinfo Lab, is an influence operation initiated by Srivastava Group starting in 2005 and enabled by Asian News International in order to promote Indian interests and disparage Pakistan and China. The operation created a network of at least 500 fake news websites and had targeted 116 countries. Srivastava Group had co-sponsored a trip of 27 Members of European Parliament to visit Kashmir and meet with Narendra Modi in 2019.

Name	Domain	Status	Notes	Sources
EP Today	eptoday.com			
EP Today	eptoday.eu			
EP Today	eptoday.org			
EP Today	europeanparliamenttoday.com			
EU Chronicle	EUChronicle.com			
EUOutlook	EUOutlook.com			
EUOutlook	EUOutlook.net			
EUOutlook	EUOutlook.org			
EUreports.com	EUreports.com			
Europeinnews.com	Europeinnews.com			
EUFreeNews.com	EUFreeNews.com			
SouthAsiaRevealed.com	SouthAsiaRevealed.com			
SouthAsiaDiary.com	SouthAsiaDiary.com			
SANews.ca	SANews.ca			
PerspectiveSouthAsia.com	PerspectiveSouthAsia.com			
SouthAsianAffairs.ca	SouthAsianAffairs.ca			
gilgitnews.net	gilgitnews.net			
gilgitpost.net	gilgitpost.net			
gilgittimes.com	gilgittimes.com			
khalistan.eu	khalistan.eu			
khalistanfm.net	khalistanfm.net			
radiokhalistan.net	radiokhalistan.net			
balochnews.com	balochnews.com			
balochistantoday.org	balochistantoday.org			
balochistantoday.net	balochistantoday.net			
European Union News Network	eunewsagency.com			
PrNewsDistribution.com	PrNewsDistribution.com			
Four News Agency	FourNewsAgency.com			
Times of Geneva	timesofgeneva.com			
4 News Agency	4newsagency.com			
New Delhi Times	newdelhitimes.com			
Times of Portugal	timesofportugal.com			
TimesofabuDhabi.com	TimesofabuDhabi.com			
Mapplenews.com	Mapplenews.com			
foreignaffairstoday.com	foreignaffairstoday.com		Spoof of Foreign Affairs.	
24hourscalgary.com	24hourscalgary.com		Spoof of 24 Hours, a defunct newspaper group.	
24hoursedmonton.com	24hoursedmonton.com		Spoof of 24 Hours, a defunct newspaper group.	
24hoursottawa.com	24hoursottawa.com		Spoof of 24 Hours, a defunct newspaper group.	
aberystwythtimes.com	aberystwythtimes.com		Spoof of Aberystwyth Times, a defunct newspaper.	
acadianrecorder.com	acadianrecorder.com		Spoof of Acadian Recorder, a defunct newspaper.	
accionobrera.com	accionobrera.com		Spoof of Acción obrera, a defunct newspaper.	
al-insaniyyah.com	al-insaniyyah.com		Spoof of Al-Insaniyyah, a defunct newspaper.	
al-jamahir.com	al-jamahir.com		Spoof of Al-Jamahir, a defunct newspaper.	
al-mabda.com	al-mabda.com		Spoof of Al-Mabda', a defunct newspaper.	
al-malayin.com	al-malayin.com		Spoof of Al-Malayin, a defunct newspaper.	
al-mukafih.com	al-mukafih.com		Spoof of Al-Mukafih, a defunct newspaper.	
al-qaidah.com	al-qaidah.com		Spoof of Al-Qaidah, a defunct newspaper.	
al-watandaily.com	al-watandaily.com		Spoof of Al-Watan Daily, a defunct newspaper.	
almalayin.com	almalayin.com		Spoof of Al-Malayin, a defunct newspaper.	
almustaqilla.com	almustaqilla.com		Spoof of Al Mustaqilla, a defunct newspaper.	
alqaidah.com	alqaidah.com		Spoof of Al-Qaidah, a defunct newspaper.	
badischesvolksecho.com	badischesvolksecho.com		Spoof of Badisches Volksecho, a defunct newspaper.	
baltimoreeveningherald.com	baltimoreeveningherald.com		Spoof of Baltimore Evening Herald, a defunct newspaper.	
baltimoremorningherald.com	baltimoremorningherald.com		Spoof of Baltimore Morning Herald, a defunct newspaper.	
barladul.com	barladul.com		Spoof of Bârladul, a defunct newspaper.	
birminghamgazette.co.uk	birminghamgazette.co.uk		Spoof of Birmingham Gazette, a defunct newspaper.	
brightonherald.com	brightonherald.com		Spoof of Brighton Herald, a defunct newspaper.	
bucharestbusinessweek.com	bucharestbusinessweek.com		Spoof of Bucharest Business Week, a defunct newspaper.	
buffaloenquirer.com	buffaloenquirer.com		Spoof of The Buffalo Enquirer, a defunct newspaper.	
calcutta-gazette.com	calcutta-gazette.com		Spoof of Calcutta Gazette, a defunct newspaper.	
cambridgeintelligencer.com	cambridgeintelligencer.com		Spoof of Cambridge Intelligencer, a defunct newspaper.	
canadianillustratednews.com	canadianillustratednews.com		Spoof of Canadian Illustrated News, a defunct newspaper.	
ceylondailymirror.com	ceylondailymirror.com		Spoof of Ceylon Daily Mirror, a defunct newspaper.	
comcast-network.com	comcast-network.com		Spoof of Comcast Network, a defunct cable TV network.	
congregationalherald.com	congregationalherald.com		Spoof of Congregational Herald, a defunct newspaper.	
courrierdethiopie.com	courrierdethiopie.com		Spoof of Courrier d'Ethiopie, a defunct newspaper.	
dailycitizen.eu	dailycitizen.eu		Spoof of Daily Citizen, a defunct newspaper.	
derdeutschecorrespondent.com	derdeutschecorrespondent.com		Spoof of Der Deutsche Correspondent, a defunct newspaper.	
derkampf.com	derkampf.com		Spoof of Der Kampf, a defunct newspaper.	
dernord-westen.com	dernord-westen.com		Spoof of Der Nord-Westen, a defunct newspaper.	
dernordstern.com	dernordstern.com		Spoof of Der Nordstern, a defunct newspaper.	
dernordwesten.com	dernordwesten.com		Spoof of Der Nord-Westen, a defunct newspaper.	
derostasiatischelloyd.com	derostasiatischelloyd.com		Spoof of Der Ostasiatische Lloyd, a defunct newspaper.	
detroitsundayjournal.com	detroitsundayjournal.com		Spoof of Detroit Sunday Journal, a defunct newspaper.	
deutscheshanghaizeitung.com	deutscheshanghaizeitung.com		Spoof of Deutsche Shanghai Zeitung, a defunct newspaper.	
diariodemanila.com	diariodemanila.com		Spoof of Diario de Manila, a defunct newspaper.	
die-einigkeit.com	die-einigkeit.com		Spoof of Die Einigkeit, a defunct newspaper.	
dieeinigkeit.com	dieeinigkeit.com		Spoof of Die Einigkeit, a defunct newspaper.	
easternmorningnews.com	easternmorningnews.com		Spoof of Eastern Morning News, a defunct newspaper.	
echodelasambre.com	echodelasambre.com		Spoof of Écho de la Sambre, a defunct newspaper.	
eestiaeg.com	eestiaeg.com		Spoof of Eesti Aeg, a defunct newspaper.	
elbiendelobrero.com	elbiendelobrero.com		Spoof of El Bien del Obrero, a defunct newspaper.	
essexgazette.com	essexgazette.com		Spoof of The Essex Gazette, a defunct newspaper.	
falceemartello.com	falceemartello.com		Spoof of Falce e Martello, a defunct newspaper.	
finnmarkfremtid.com	finnmarkfremtid.com		Spoof of Finnmark Fremtid, a defunct newspaper.	
foxfootychannel.com	foxfootychannel.com		Spoof of Fox Footy Channel, a defunct TV channel.	
frontulplugarilor.com	frontulplugarilor.com		Spoof of Frontul Plugarilor, a defunct newspaper.	
garydailytribune.com	garydailytribune.com		Spoof of Gary Daily Tribune, a defunct newspaper.	
gazetteandsentinel.com	gazetteandsentinel.com		Spoof of Gazette and Sentinel, a defunct newspaper.	
goldcoastmail.com	goldcoastmail.com		Spoof of Gold Coast Mail, a defunct newspaper.	
golostruda.com	golostruda.com		Spoof of Golos Truda, a defunct newspaper.	
greateastlandtelevision.com	greateastlandtelevision.com		Spoof of Great Eastland Television, a defunct TV station network.	
hamevasser.com	hamevasser.com		Spoof of Hamevasser, a defunct newspaper.	
hardangerarbeiderblad.com	hardangerarbeiderblad.com		Spoof of Hardanger Arbeiderblad, a defunct newspaper.	
hartfordcitycourier.com	hartfordcitycourier.com		Spoof of Hartford City Courier, a defunct newspaper.	
hartfordcitydemocrat.com	hartfordcitydemocrat.com		Spoof of Hartford City Democrat, a defunct newspaper.	
hayatechchaab.com	hayatechchaab.com		Spoof of Hayat ech Chaab, a defunct newspaper.	
heiminshimbun.com	heiminshimbun.com		Spoof of Heimin Shimbun, a defunct newspaper.	
huashangdaily.com	huashangdaily.com		Spoof of Hua Shang Daily, a defunct newspaper.	
indianapolisdailyherald.com	indianapolisdailyherald.com		Spoof of Indianapolis Daily Herald, a defunct newspaper.	
israelshtime.com	israelshtime.com		Spoof of Israel Shtime, a defunct newspaper.	
kansascityjournalpost.com	kansascityjournalpost.com		Spoof of Kansas City Journal-Post, a defunct newspaper.	
karjalanmaa.com	karjalanmaa.com		Spoof of Karjalan Maa, a defunct newspaper.	
kentuckyirishamerican.com	kentuckyirishamerican.com		Spoof of Kentucky Irish American, a defunct newspaper.	
khalsa-akhbar-lahore.com	khalsa-akhbar-lahore.com		Spoof of Khalsa Akhbar Lahore, a defunct newspaper.	
khalsaakhbarlahore.com	khalsaakhbarlahore.com		Spoof of Khalsa Akhbar Lahore, a defunct newspaper.	
labanderaroja.com	labanderaroja.com		Spoof of La Bandera Roja, a defunct newspaper.	
ladomenicadelcorriere.com	ladomenicadelcorriere.com		Spoof of La Domenica del Corriere, a defunct newspaper.	
lailustracionfilipina.com	lailustracionfilipina.com		Spoof of La Ilustración Filipina, a defunct newspaper.	
lajeunebelgique.com	lajeunebelgique.com		Spoof of La Jeune Belgique, a defunct newspaper.	
lanouvelleinternationale.com	lanouvelleinternationale.com		Spoof of La Nouvelle Internationale, a defunct newspaper.	
lecanadien.ca	lecanadien.ca		Spoof of Le Canadien, a defunct newspaper.	
lechodukatanga.com	lechodukatanga.com		Spoof of L'Écho du Katanga, a defunct newspaper.	
lecommuniste.com	lecommuniste.com		Spoof of Le Communiste, a defunct newspaper.	
leedstimes.co.uk	leedstimes.co.uk		Spoof of Leeds Times, a defunct newspaper.	
legrutleen.com	legrutleen.com		Spoof of Le Grutléen, a defunct newspaper.	
leninshilzhas.com	leninshilzhas.com		Spoof of Leninshil Zhas, a defunct newspaper.	
lepaysdefrance.com	lepaysdefrance.com		Spoof of Le Pays de France, a defunct newspaper.	
lereveildutadla.com	lereveildutadla.com		Spoof of Le Réveil du Tadla, a defunct newspaper.	
lereveiljuif.com	lereveiljuif.com		Spoof of Le Réveil juif, a defunct newspaper.	
liverpoolcourier.com	liverpoolcourier.com		Spoof of Liverpool Courier, a defunct newspaper.	
manchesterexaminer.com	manchesterexaminer.com		Spoof of Manchester Examiner, a defunct newspaper.	
manchestertimes.co.uk	manchestertimes.co.uk		Spoof of Manchester Times, a defunct newspaper.	
metroeastjournal.com	metroeastjournal.com		Spoof of Metro-East Journal, a defunct newspaper.	
miamivalleychannel.com	miamivalleychannel.com		Spoof of Miami Valley Channel, a defunct cable TV channel.	
minneapoliseveningjournal.com	minneapoliseveningjournal.com		Spoof of Minneapolis Evening Journal, a defunct newspaper.	
mirat-ul-akhbar.com	mirat-ul-akhbar.com		Spoof of Mirat-ul-Akhbar, a defunct newspaper.	
montrealdailynews.com	montrealdailynews.com		Spoof of Montreal Daily News, a defunct newspaper.	
moskovskykorrespondent.com	moskovskykorrespondent.com		Spoof of Moskovsky Korrespondent, a defunct newspaper.	
msnbc.uk	msnbc.uk		Spoof of MSNBC.	
nasisten.com	nasisten.com		Spoof of Nasisten, a defunct newspaper.	
neweveningpost.com	neweveningpost.com		Spoof of New Evening Post, a defunct newspaper.	
newyorkcourierandenquirer.com	newyorkcourierandenquirer.com		Spoof of New York Courier and Enquirer, a defunct newspaper.	
newyorkeveningjournal.com	newyorkeveningjournal.com		Spoof of New York Evening Journal, a defunct newspaper.	
newyorkmorningtelegraph.com	newyorkmorningtelegraph.com		Spoof of The Morning Telegraph, a defunct newspaper.	
newyorksundaynews.com	newyorksundaynews.com		Spoof of New York Sunday News, a defunct newspaper.	
niagaranewstv.com	niagaranewstv.com		Spoof of Niagara News TV, a defunct TV channel.	
northchinadailynews.com	northchinadailynews.com		Spoof of North China Daily News, a defunct newspaper.	
northotagotimes.com	northotagotimes.com		Spoof of North Otago Times, a defunct newspaper.	
northwestradio.ca	northwestradio.ca		Spoof of North West Radio, a defunct radio station.	
oransocialiste.com	oransocialiste.com		Spoof of Oran socialiste, a defunct newspaper.	
pekinggazette.com	pekinggazette.com		Spoof of Peking Gazette, a defunct government bulletin.	
philippinesdailyexpress.com	philippinesdailyexpress.com		Spoof of Philippines Daily Express, a defunct newspaper.	
portlandeveningjournal.com	portlandeveningjournal.com		Spoof of The Oregon Journal, a defunct newspaper.	
protitisaigialeias.com	protitisaigialeias.com		Spoof of Proti tis Aigialeias.	
russkoyeznamya.com	russkoyeznamya.com		Spoof of Russkoye Znamya, a defunct newspaper.	
saltlaketelegram.com	saltlaketelegram.com		Spoof of Salt Lake Telegram, a defunct newspaper.	
schweizamsonntag.com	schweizamsonntag.com		Spoof of Schweiz am Sonntag, a defunct newspaper.	
associatedmediacoverage.com	associatedmediacoverage.com		Spoof of Associated Press.	
shanghaieveningpostandmercury.com	shanghaieveningpostandmercury.com		Spoof of Shanghai Evening Post & Mercury, a defunct newspaper.	
shanghaijewishchronicle.com	shanghaijewishchronicle.com		Spoof of Shanghai Jewish Chronicle, a defunct newspaper.	
singainesan.com	singainesan.com		Spoof of Singai Nesan, a defunct newspaper.	
socialistweekly.com	socialistweekly.com		Spoof of Socialist Weekly, a defunct newspaper.	
sovietweekly.com	sovietweekly.com		Spoof of Soviet Weekly, a defunct newspaper.	
spoknippet.com	spoknippet.com		Spoof of Spöknippet, a defunct newspaper.	
srilankadeepa.com	srilankadeepa.com		Spoof of Sri Lankadeepa, a defunct newspaper.	
swatantranepali.com	swatantranepali.com		Spoof of Swatantra Nepali, a defunct newspaper.	
sydney-gazette.com	sydney-gazette.com		Spoof of Sydney Gazette, a defunct newspaper.	
theadaircountynews.com	theadaircountynews.com		Spoof of Adair County News, a defunct newspaper.	
theamericanweekly.com	theamericanweekly.com		Spoof of The American Weekly, a defunct newspaper.	
unitedmediapublishing.com	unitedmediapublishing.com		Spoof of United Media.	
theaustraliancommunist.com	theaustraliancommunist.com		Spoof of The Australian Communist, a defunct newspaper.	
thebangkokrecorder.com	thebangkokrecorder.com		Spoof of The Bangkok Recorder, a defunct newspaper.	
thebaptisttimes.com	thebaptisttimes.com		Spoof of The Baptist Times.	
thebombaychronicle.com	thebombaychronicle.com		Spoof of The Bombay Chronicle, a defunct newspaper.	
theceylonherald.com	theceylonherald.com		Spoof of The Ceylon Herald, a defunct newspaper.	
thecharlottesvilletribune.com	thecharlottesvilletribune.com		Spoof of The Charlottesville Tribune, a defunct newspaper.	
theclevelandgazette.com	theclevelandgazette.com		Spoof of The Cleveland Gazette, a defunct newspaper.	
thecolombojournal.com	thecolombojournal.com		Spoof of The Colombo Journal, a defunct newspaper.	
thedearbornindependent.com	thedearbornindependent.com		Spoof of The Dearborn Independent, a defunct newspaper.	
thedublingazette.com	thedublingazette.com		Spoof of The Dublin Gazette, a defunct newspaper.	
thehoovergazette.com	thehoovergazette.com		Spoof of The Hoover Gazette, a defunct newspaper.	
thejewishtribune.com	thejewishtribune.com		Spoof of The Jewish Tribune, a defunct newspaper.	
thekamloopsdailynews.com	thekamloopsdailynews.com		Spoof of The Kamloops Daily News, a defunct newspaper.	
thekungsheungdailynews.com	thekungsheungdailynews.com		Spoof of The Kung Sheung Daily News, a defunct newspaper.	
theliverpoolherald.com	theliverpoolherald.com		Spoof of The Liverpool Herald, a defunct newspaper.	
theliverpoolnews.com	theliverpoolnews.com		Spoof of The Liverpool News, a defunct newspaper.	
thelouisvilleheraldpost.com	thelouisvilleheraldpost.com		Spoof of Louisville Herald-Post, a defunct newspaper.	
thelouisvilletimes.com	thelouisvilletimes.com		Spoof of The Louisville Times, a defunct newspaper.	
themadrastimes.com	themadrastimes.com		Spoof of The Madras Times, a defunct newspaper.	
themirrorofaustralia.com	themirrorofaustralia.com		Spoof of The Mirror of Australia, a defunct newspaper.	
thenevadajournal.com	thenevadajournal.com		Spoof of The Nevada Journal, a defunct newspaper.	
thenewzealandtablet.com	thenewzealandtablet.com		Spoof of The New Zealand Tablet, a defunct newspaper.	
thenorfolkweeklynews.com	thenorfolkweeklynews.com		Spoof of The Norfolk Weekly News, a defunct newspaper.	
theoregonjournal.com	theoregonjournal.com		Spoof of The Oregon Journal, a defunct newspaper.	
thequebectelegraph.com	thequebectelegraph.com		Spoof of Quebec Chronicle-Telegraph, a defunct newspaper.	
thesandbornherald.com	thesandbornherald.com		Spoof of The Sandborn Herald, a defunct newspaper.	
theseattlestar.com	theseattlestar.com		Spoof of The Seattle Star, a defunct newspaper.	
thetimesofceylon.com	thetimesofceylon.com		Spoof of The Times of Ceylon, a defunct newspaper.	
thetorontomail.com	thetorontomail.com		Spoof of The Toronto Mail, a defunct newspaper.	
thetulsatribune.com	thetulsatribune.com		Spoof of Tulsa Tribune, a defunct newspaper.	
thewellingtonindependent.com	thewellingtonindependent.com		Spoof of The Wellington Independent, a defunct newspaper.	
thewhitesvilleindependentpress.com	thewhitesvilleindependentpress.com		Spoof of The Whitesville Independent Press, a defunct newspaper.	
timesofcyprus.com	timesofcyprus.com		Spoof of Times of Cyprus, a defunct newspaper.	
tokyonichinichishimbun.com	tokyonichinichishimbun.com		Spoof of Tokyo Nichi Nichi Shimbun, a defunct newspaper.	
topekastatejournal.com	topekastatejournal.com		Spoof of The Topeka Capital-Journal.	
torontotelegram.com	torontotelegram.com		Spoof of Toronto Telegram, a defunct newspaper.	
worldeconomicherald.com	worldeconomicherald.com		Spoof of World Economic Herald, a defunct newspaper.	
24hoursmanitoba.com	24hoursmanitoba.com			
3newsagency.com	3newsagency.com			
akhbarulusbua.com	akhbarulusbua.com			
eveningpost.eu	eveningpost.eu			
houstoneveningjournal.com	houstoneveningjournal.com			
houstonmorningchronicle.com	houstonmorningchronicle.com			
ludhiana-times.com	ludhiana-times.com			
lyonsherald.com	lyonsherald.com			
memphismorningnews.com	memphismorningnews.com			
newyorknationaldemocrat.com	newyorknationaldemocrat.com			
newyorkpressagency.com	newyorkpressagency.com			
plymouthtribune.com	plymouthtribune.com			
quebecherald.com	quebecherald.com			
rochesterdailyamerican.com	rochesterdailyamerican.com			
rockportjournal.com	rockportjournal.com			
rockvilletimes.com	rockvilletimes.com			
russkyinvalid.com	russkyinvalid.com			
sindhgazette.com	sindhgazette.com			
thecanadianspectator.com	thecanadianspectator.com			
thehazletonnews.com	thehazletonnews.com			
thelivenews.co.uk	thelivenews.co.uk			
thesenator.eu	thesenator.eu			
thestatesman.eu	thestatesman.eu			
threemediagroup.com	threemediagroup.com			
threenewsagency.com	threenewsagency.com			
timesofalaska.com	timesofalaska.com			
timesofambala.com	timesofambala.com			
timesofamsterdam.com	timesofamsterdam.com			
timesofargentina.com	timesofargentina.com			
timesofaustria.com	timesofaustria.com			
timesofazadkashmir.com	timesofazadkashmir.com			
timesofbali.com	timesofbali.com			
timesofbelgium.com	timesofbelgium.com			
timesofbern.com	timesofbern.com			
timesofbhutan.com	timesofbhutan.com			
timesofbonn.com	timesofbonn.com			
timesofbulgaria.com	timesofbulgaria.com			
timesofcanberra.com	timesofcanberra.com			
timesofcebu.com	timesofcebu.com			
timesofchiangmai.com	timesofchiangmai.com			
timesofchile.com	timesofchile.com			
timesofcostarica.com	timesofcostarica.com			
timesofcroatia.com	timesofcroatia.com			
timesofdefence.com	timesofdefence.com			
timesofeqypt.com	timesofeqypt.com			
timesofestonia.com	timesofestonia.com			
timesofgeneva.com	timesofgeneva.com			
timesofhonduras.com	timesofhonduras.com			
timesofhungary.com	timesofhungary.com			
timesofjakarta.com	timesofjakarta.com			
timesofjeddah.com	timesofjeddah.com			
timesofkazakhstan.com	timesofkazakhstan.com			
timesoflatvia.com	timesoflatvia.com			
timesoflibya.com	timesoflibya.com			
timesofluxembourg.com	timesofluxembourg.com			
timesofmacau.com	timesofmacau.com			
timesofmadinah.com	timesofmadinah.com			
timesofmadrid.com	timesofmadrid.com			
timesofmanitoba.com	timesofmanitoba.com			
timesofmecca.com	timesofmecca.com			
timesofmedina.com	timesofmedina.com			
timesofmorocco.com	timesofmorocco.com			
timesofnaples.com	timesofnaples.com			
timesofnetherlands.com	timesofnetherlands.com			
timesofnewbrunswick.com	timesofnewbrunswick.com			
timesofnorthkorea.com	timesofnorthkorea.com			
timesofpalau.com	timesofpalau.com			
timesofperu.com	timesofperu.com			
timesofpyongyang.com	timesofpyongyang.com			
timesofriyadh.com	timesofriyadh.com			
timesofromania.com	timesofromania.com			
timesofsaotome.com	timesofsaotome.com			
timesofseattle.com	timesofseattle.com			
timesofseoul.com	timesofseoul.com			
timesofsouthchinasea.com	timesofsouthchinasea.com			
timesofsouthkorea.com	timesofsouthkorea.com			
timesofspain.com	timesofspain.com			
timesoftokyo.com	timesoftokyo.com			
timesofvatican.com	timesofvatican.com			
timesofvenezuela.com	timesofvenezuela.com			
weeklylouisianian.com	weeklylouisianian.com			
thr.threemediagroup.com	thr.threemediagroup.com			
24hoursmontreal.com	24hoursmontreal.com		Spoof of 24 Hours, a defunct newspaper group.	
24hoursvancouver.com	24hoursvancouver.com		Spoof of 24 Hours, a defunct newspaper group.	
albanydailydemocrat.com	albanydailydemocrat.com		Spoof of Albany Democrat-Herald.	
baltimoreeveningsun.com	baltimoreeveningsun.com		Spoof of The Baltimore Sun.	
brownsvilletimes.com	brownsvilletimes.com		Spoof of The Times (Brownsville).	
cbs-cable.com	cbs-cable.com		Spoof of CBS Cable.	
dailystatesentinel.com	dailystatesentinel.com		Spoof of The Daily Sentinel (Texas).	
timesoflosangeles.com	timesoflosangeles.com		Spoof of Los Angeles Times.	
timesofmoscow.com	timesofmoscow.com		Spoof of The Moscow Times.	
Big News Network	Bignewsnetwork.net		Also affiliated with Midwest Radio Network.	
Big News Network	bignewsnetwork.com		Also affiliated with Midwest Radio Network.	
FijiNews.net	FijiNews.net			
NorthKoreaTimes.com	NorthKoreaTimes.com			
VancouverStar.com	VancouverStar.com			
PhoenixHerald.com	PhoenixHerald.com			
RussiaHerald.com	RussiaHerald.com			
CambodianTimes.com	CambodianTimes.com			
indiasnews.net	indiasnews.net			
zimbabwenews.net	zimbabwenews.net			
sierraleonetimes.com	sierraleonetimes.com			
World News Network	worldnewsnetwork.net			
Los Angeles Evening Despatch				
British News Network				
Washington DC Despatch				
Wisconsin Journal				
Sri Lanka Island News				
Westminster Times				
Japan Times Today	japantimestoday.com		Spoof of The Japan Times.	
South China Herald	southchinaherald.news		Spoof of the South China Morning Post.	
Wall Street Sentinel	wallstreetsentinel.news		Spoof of The Wall Street Journal.	
New York Despatch				
Toronto Sun Times				
UAE Times				

==== Other campaigns ====
Name	Domain	Status	Notes	Sources
The Disinfo Lab	thedisinfolab.org		Owned by an officer of India's foreign intelligence agency, the Research and Analysis Wing.	

=== Iran ===
==== Endless Mayfly ====
Endless Mayfly, dubbed by Citizen Lab, is an Iran-affiliated disinformation campaign of inauthentic social media accounts and fake news websites that, according to Citizen Lab, "spreads falsehoods and amplifies narratives critical of Saudi Arabia, the United States, and Israel." It is notable for using a technique that Citizen Lab described as "ephemeral disinformation": When an article from the campaign received significant engagement on social media, it was deleted and URLs were linked to the website that the article was falsely portraying.

Name	Domain	Status	Notes	Sources
addustuor.com	addustuor.com		Spoof of Addustour.	
xn--aljaeera-4t0d.net	xn--aljaeera-4t0d.net		Spoofing of Al Jazeera. Likely part of an active measures campaign by the Russian government in 2017. Also part of Endless Mayfly, an Iran-affiliated disinformation campaign.	
al-jazirah.org	al-jazirah.org		Spoof of Al Jazeera.	
al-shargh.com	al-shargh.com		Spoof of Al Sharq.	
al-watan.co	al-watan.co		Spoof of Al-Watan.	
alarabyia.org	alarabyia.org		Spoof of Al Arabiya.	
alettehad.net	alettehad.net		Spoof of Al-Ittihad.	
aliraq-news.com	aliraq-news.com			
aljlazeera.com	aljlazeera.com		Spoof of Al Jazeera.	
xn--alnaaregypt-cm8e.com	xn--alnaaregypt-cm8e.com		Spoof of Al-Nahar.	
alryiadh.com	alryiadh.com		Spoof of Al Riyadh.	
alwatannewspaper.net	alwatannewspaper.net		Spoof of Al-Watan.	
xn--arab21-6va.com	xn--arab21-6va.com		Spoof of Arabi21.	
theatlatnic.com	theatlatnic.com		Spoofing of The Atlantic. Likely part of an active measures campaign by the Russian government in 2017. Also part of Endless Mayfly, an Iran-affiliated disinformation campaign.	
bbc-Arabic.com	bbc-Arabic.com		Spoof of BBC Arabic.	
belfercenter.net	belfercenter.net		Spoof of Belfer Center. Falsely claims that Avigdor Lieberman was fired by Benjamin Netanyahu in 2018 for being a Russian agent.	
bloomberq.com	bloomberq.com		Spoof of Bloomberg.com.	
braekingisraelnews.com	braekingisraelnews.com		Spoof of Breaking Israel News.	
breakingisraelnews.net	breakingisraelnews.net		Spoof of Breaking Israel News.	
brusslestimes.com	brusslestimes.com		Spoof of The Brussels Times.	
budapestbaecon.com	budapestbaecon.com		Spoof of The Budapest Beacon.	
bundesergierung.de	bundesergierung.de		Spoof of the official Bundesregierung website.	
xn--c-wpma.com	xn--c-wpma.com		Spoof of CNN.	
com-news-world.site	com-news-world.site		Spoof of the BBC.	
com-users.info	com-users.info			
dawalhaq.com	dawalhaq.com			
daylisabah.com	daylisabah.com		Spoof of the Daily Sabah.	
democraticcoalition.net	democraticcoalition.net			
xn--etik-k54a.com	xn--etik-k54a.com		Spoof of Detik.	
elwataannews.com	elwataannews.com		Spoof of El Watan News.	
xn--emaraalyoum-1b9e.com	xn--emaraalyoum-1b9e.com		Spoof of Emarat Al Youm.	
emaratallyoum.com	emaratallyoum.com		Spoof of Emarat Al Youm.	
emaratalyuom.com	emaratalyuom.com		Spoof of Emarat Al Youm.	
foreignpoilcy.com	foreignpoilcy.com		Spoof of Foreign Policy.	
foriegnpolicy.net	foriegnpolicy.net		Spoof of Foreign Policy.	
xn--frace24-mkb.com	xn--frace24-mkb.com		Spoof of France 24.	
theglobeandmail.org	theglobeandmail.org		Spoof of The Globe and Mail.	
thaguardian.com	thaguardian.com		Spoof of The Guardian.	
theguaradian.com	theguaradian.com		Spoof of The Guardian.	
xn--theguardan-4ub.com	xn--theguardan-4ub.com		Spoofing of The Guardian that uses an IDN homograph attack in which the "i" in the "guardian" is replaced by the Turkish character "ı". Contains fabricated quotes from John Scarlett that suggest CIA and MI6 involvement in the Rose Revolution to weaken Russia. Likely part of an active measures campaign by the Russian government in 2017. Also part of Endless Mayfly, an Iran-affiliated disinformation campaign.	
xn--theguardia-dq2e.com	xn--theguardia-dq2e.com		Spoof of The Guardian.	
haaaretz.com	haaaretz.com		Spoof of Haaretz.	
xn--haarez-m17b.com	xn--haarez-m17b.com		Spoofing of Haaretz. Likely part of an active measures campaign by the Russian government in 2017. Also part of Endless Mayfly, an Iran-affiliated disinformation campaign.	
theheraldscotland.com	theheraldscotland.com		Spoof of The Herald Scotland.	
xn--huffngtonpost-69b.com	xn--huffngtonpost-69b.com		Spoof of the Huffington Post that uses an IDN homograph attack, replacing "i" with "ı".	
xn--ndependent-77a.com	xn--ndependent-77a.com		Spoof of The Independent.	
indepnedent.co	indepnedent.co		Typosquatting spoof of The Independent.	
israelhayom.net	israelhayom.net		Spoof of Israel Hayom.	
xn--sraelinarabic-29b.com	xn--sraelinarabic-29b.com		Spoof of Israel in Arabic.	
xn--israelinarabi-ugb.com	xn--israelinarabi-ugb.com		Spoof of Israel in Arabic.	
israellinarabic.com	israellinarabic.com		Spoof of Israel in Arabic.	
israelnationalnews.co	israelnationalnews.co		Spoof of Israel National News.	
israelnationalnews.net	israelnationalnews.net		Spoof of Israel National News.	
jerusaleimonline.com	jerusaleimonline.com		Spoof of Jerusalem Online.	
thejerusalempost.org	thejerusalempost.org		Spoof of The Jerusalem Post.	
lesoir.info	lesoir.info		Spoof of Le Soir. Part of Endless Mayfly, an Iran-affiliated disinformation campaign. Also used to spread a false claim about Emmanuel Macron's campaign being funded by Saudi Arabia during the 2017 French Presidential Election.	
xn--telocal-xt3c.com	xn--telocal-xt3c.com		Spoof of The Local.	
mesralarabiya.com	mesralarabiya.com		Spoof of MasrAlarabia.	
mintpressnevvs.com	mintpressnevvs.com		Spoof of MintPress News.	
nationalepost.com	nationalepost.com		Spoof of National Post.	
xn--nationmaser-5b9e.com	xn--nationmaser-5b9e.com		Spoof of NationMaster.	
policito.com	policito.com		Spoof of Politico.	
xn--plitico-d5b.com	xn--plitico-d5b.com		Spoof of Politico.	
xn--r-2rm.com	xn--r-2rm.com		Spoof of RT.	
sharjah24.co	sharjah24.co		Spoof of Sharjah24.	
shoruknews.com	shoruknews.com		Spoof of Al-Shorouk.	
speigel.net	speigel.net		Spoof of Der Spiegel.	
timesoffisrael.com	timesoffisrael.com		Spoof of The Times of Israel.	
timesofisraeil.com	timesofisraeil.com		Spoof of The Times of Israel.	
xn--wa-exs.com	xn--wa-exs.com		Spoof of Emirates News Agency.	
waradena.com	waradena.com		Spoof of Waradana.	
washnigtonexaminer.com	washnigtonexaminer.com		Spoof of The Washington Examiner.	

==== International Union of Virtual Media (IUVM) ====
The International Union of Virtual Media is described by the Atlantic Council as "a cluster of ostensibly independent websites that aggressively repackaged and re-broadcast Iranian state media", without citation. The network has been taken down by Facebook, Twitter, and Google for coordinated inauthentic behavior.

Name	Domain	Status	Notes	Sources
iuvm.org	iuvm.org		Seized by the United States federal government in 2020.	
IUVMApp				
IUVM Archive	iuvmarchive.com			
iuvmdaily.com	iuvmdaily.com			
iuvmonline.com	iuvmonline.com			
IUVM Pixel	iuvmpixel.com			
IUVM Press	iuvmpress.com		Seized by the United States federal government in 2020.	
IUVM TV	iuvmtv.com		Seized by the United States federal government in 2020.	

==== Storm-2035 ====
Storm-2035, dubbed by Microsoft Threat Analysis Center in August 2024, is attributed by Microsoft researchers to "an Iranian network" and described by them as a collection of fake news websites that has been active since at least 2020 and has targeted both conservative and liberal audiences in the United States. At least some of their content has been alleged by Microsoft to be created by generative artificial intelligence models to repost content from United States-based news outlets without attribution. Such outlets include The Guardian, The Week, Newsweek, and the Los Angeles Times. An investigation from OpenAI found that the network used ChatGPT to generate articles and social media comments. A network of social media accounts that promoted one of the sites was taken down in 2022 by Twitter for coordinated inauthentic behavior.

Name	Domain	Status	Notes	Sources
Afro Majority	afromajority.com			
EvenPolitics	evenpolitics.com			
Nio Thinker	niothinker.com			
Not Our War				
Savannah Time	savannahtime.com			
Teorator	teorator.com			
Westland Sun	westlandsun.com			

==== Other campaigns ====
Name	Domain	Status	Notes	Sources
AWDNews	awdnews.com	Defunct	Khawaja Muhammad Asif, the Minister of Defence of Pakistan, warned Israel of nuclear retaliation on Twitter after a false story claiming that Avigdor Lieberman, the Israeli Ministry of Defense, said "If Pakistan send ground troops into Syria on any pretext, we will destroy this country with a nuclear attack." Seized by the United States federal government in 2020.	
The British Left	britishleft.com		Masquerades as a United Kingdom-based news outlet.	
Critics Chronicle	criticschronicle.com		Masquerades as a United Kingdom-based news outlet.	
Instituto Manquehue	institutomanquehue.org		Masquerades as a Latin America-based NGO.	
Liberty Front Press	libertyfrontpress.com		Masquerades as a United States-based news outlet.	
Real Progressive Front	rpfront.com		Masquerades as a United States-based news outlet and NGO.	
US Journal	usjournal.net		Masquerades as a United States-based news outlet.	

=== Israel ===
==== Zeno Zeno ====
Starting in October 2023, the Israeli government via the Ministry of Diaspora Affairs supported what The New York Times and Haaretz described as an "influence campaign" that primarily targeted Black lawmakers in the Democratic Party, as well as young left-leaning residents of the United States and Canada. The ministry hired Stoic, an Israeli political marketing firm, to conduct the operation, dubbed Zeno Zeno by OpenAI. Social media accounts and pages linked to the campaign were taken down by Meta in 2024 for coordinated inauthentic behavior, including the use of profile pictures created by generative adversarial networks and possibly hijacked accounts. Many social media posts from the campaign were created by ChatGPT.

Name	Domain	Status	Notes	Sources
Arab Slave Trade	arabslavetrade.wiki		Copied from Wikipedia. Targeted Black Americans to spread the message of Arab involvement in the slave trade in Africa.	
The Good Samaritan	the-good-samaritan.com		Per Haaretz, a site that "mapped and ranked American universities according to the amount of alleged antisemitic incidents on their campuses and whether it was safe for Jews to study there." Promoted by Non-Agenda.	
The Moral Alliance	moral-alliance.com		Described by FakeReporter as a "fictitious online [platform]". Redirected to The Good Samaritan website.	
The Moral Alliance	moralalliance.co		Described by FakeReporter as a "fictitious online [platform]". Redirected to The Good Samaritan website.	
Non-Agenda	nonagenda.com		Described by FakeReporter as a "fictitious online [platform]".	
Serenity Now!	serenitynow.today		Posed as an anarchist website.	
The Human Fellowship	thehumanfellowship.co		Linked to The Moral Alliance.	
Unfold Magazine	ufnews.io		Described by FakeReporter as a "fictitious online [platform]".	
United Citizens for Canada	uc4canada.com		Targeting a Canadian audience, published content widely described as Islamophobic.	

=== Italy ===
Name	Domain	Status	Notes	Sources
ByoBlu	byoblu.com		Spread false claims about contact tracing applications used during the COVID-19 pandemic. Founded by former communication lead of the Five Star Movement. Published deceptive information circulated on Twitter, spreading disinformation in the context of the 2019 European elections.	
Il Primato Nazionale	ilprimatonazionale.it		Spread false information about Italian government policy with respect to immigrants and COVID-19. Linked to CasaPound.	
La Cosa	la-cosa.it		Setup by the Five Star Movement.	
La Fucina	lafucina.it		Setup by the Five Star Movement. Falsely claimed that Malaysia Airlines Flight 17 was shot down by a Ukrainian pilot.	
TzeTze	tzetze.it		Setup by the Five Star Movement.	

=== Mexico ===
Name	Domain	Status	Notes	Sources
elpoderdelsaber.com	elpoderdelsaber.com		Associated with Ernesto Cordero Arroyo, Heriberto Félix Guerra, and Juan Ignacio Zavala of the National Action Party. Published death hoax about Carmen Aristegui.	
elviejosabio.com	elviejosabio.com		Associated with Ernesto Cordero Arroyo, Heriberto Félix Guerra, and Juan Ignacio Zavala of the National Action Party.	
sevenaldia.com	sevenaldia.com		Associated with Ernesto Cordero Arroyo, Heriberto Félix Guerra, and Juan Ignacio Zavala of the National Action Party.	
telodijeyo.com	telodijeyo.com		Associated with Ernesto Cordero Arroyo, Heriberto Félix Guerra, and Juan Ignacio Zavala of the National Action Party.	

=== Myanmar ===
Name	Domain	Status	Notes	Sources
Tatmadaw Media Group	tatmadawmediagroup.com		Linked to members of the Tatmadaw. Part of a network that was taken down by Facebook in 2020 for coordinated inauthentic behavior.	

=== Nigeria ===
Name	Domain	Status	Notes	Sources
Aso Villa News	asovillanews.xyz		Owned by activist of the Indigenous People of Biafra movement.	
Exclusive103	exclusive103.com		Per Africa Check and DUBAWA. Owned by activist of the Indigenous People of Biafra movement.	
I News	imocitytv.com		Owned by activist of the Indigenous People of Biafra movement.	

=== Pakistan ===
Name	Domain	Status	Notes	Sources
CJ Post	cjpost.co.uk		Linked to AlphaPro, a Pakistani public relations firm, which also has ties to the Inter-Services Public Relations (ISPR) of the Pakistani military. Part of a network of social media accounts and pages that was taken down by Facebook in 2021 for coordinated inauthentic behavior. A separate network of accounts and pages that was alleged to be linked to the ISPR was taken down by Facebook in 2019.	

=== People's Republic of China ===
==== HaiEnergy ====
Shanghai Haixun Technology Co., Ltd (上海海讯社科技有限公司), a Chinese public relations firm, is linked to an influence campaign (titled "HaiEnergy" by Mandiant) to promote positive energy, which Mandiant defines as "messages positively portraying the Chinese Communist Party (CCP), the Chinese Government, and its policies." Mandiant alleged that the firm had possibly staged protests in Washington D.C. in 2022 involving religious freedom and the Uyghur Forced Labor Prevention Act.

Name	Domain	Status	Notes	Sources
24 News	24usnews.com			
Aisa Korea	aisakorea.com			
All City Times	allcitytimes.com			
Anna Times	annatimes.com			
Austria Weekly	austriaweekly.com			
Charm Daily	charmdaily.com			
Czech Weekly	czechweekly.com			
Director Times	directortimes.com			
Donga Daily	dongadaily.com			
Egypt Daily	egyptdaily.org			
Elec Daily	elecdaily.com			
Espana Daily	espanadaily.com			
Eur Times	eutimes.fr			
Exactly News	exactlynews.com			
E.MP	finance.austriaweekly.com			
Finance.TZ	finance.thaibizdaily.com			
Finland Weekly	finlandweekly.com			
Focus on Russia	automobile.trademarksdaily.com			
財富台灣	caifutw.com			
FT Voice	finance.thewarsawvoice.com			
Hani Daily	hanidaily.com			
Hanna Press	hannapress.com			
Health Latest Job News	health.latestjobnews.in			
香港日報	hkdaily.net			
香港週報	weeklyhongkong.com			
Huabei Daily	vn.huabeidaily.com			
Hurriyet Business	hurriyetbusiness.com			
Inspect News	inspectnews.com			
Jakarta Globe	jakartaglobe.org			
Joins Da	markets.joinsdaily.com			
The Korea Times	thekoreatimes.org			
KR Economy	kreconomy.com			
KR Pop Star	krpopstar.com			
Latest Job News	latestjobnews.in			
Lehua Times	lehuatimes.com			
Lori Times	loritimes.com			
Mecha Times	mechatimes.com			
Moscow TV	moscowtv.vip			
Nanyang Daily	nanyangdaily.com			
Nets Bay	netsbay.com			
New Delhi News	newdelhinews.club			
New York City Morning Post	nycmorning.com			
NGR Daily	nigeriacom.com			
NZL Daily	newzealandgazette.com			
Portugal Daily	portugaldaily.com			
Qatar Daily	qatardaily.org			
RAND Daily	randdaily.com			
RU Business	rubusiness.club			
RU Industrial	ruindustrial.com			
Russian Daily	russiadaily.org			
Russian Daily	therussiadaily.com			
Sain Times	saintimes.com			
Saudi Weekly	saudiweekly.com			
Seoul Daily	seouldaily.org			
Startup India Magazine	startupindiamagazine.com			
Swiss Weekly	swissweekly.com			
Swiss Zeitung	swisszeitung.com			
台灣焦點	hotintaiwan.com			
TH Truth	thtruth.com			
The Thailands	thethailands.com			
TMK Daily	trademarksdaily.com			
Toyo Times	toyotimes.com			
Unsee News	unseenews.com			
The Warsaw Voice	thewarsawvoice.com			
Yarl Times	yarltimes.com			
Yasu Daily	yasudaily.com			
Times Newswire	timesnewswire.com		Linked to both HaiEnergy and PAPERWALL influence operations.	
World Newswire	wdwire.com		Used by Haixun and owned by another marketing firm based in China, Shenzhen Bowen Media Information Technology Co., Ltd.	
The Arizona Republic	finance.azcentral.com			
Pittsburgh Post-Gazette	markets.post-gazette.com			
Starkville Daily News	business.starkvilledailynews.com			
The Kane Republican	business.kanerepublican.com			
Sweetwater Reporter	business.sweetwaterreporter.com			
The Daily Press	business.smdailypress.com			
Poteau Daily News	business.poteaudailynews.com			
The Call	business.woonsocketcall.com			
Mammoth Times	business.mammothtimes.com			
The Evening Leader	business.theeveningleader.com			
The Post and Mail	business.thepostandmail.com			
My Mother Lode	money.mymotherlode.com			
The Inyo Register	business.inyoregister.com			
The Punxsutawney Spirit	business.punxsutawneyspirit.com			
Borger New-Herald	business.borgernewsherald.com			
The Times	business.pawtuckettimes.com			
Statesman Examiner	business.statesmanexaminer.com			
Decatur Daily Democrat	business.decaturdailydemocrat.com			
The Pilot News	business.thepilotnews.com			
The Newport Daily Express	business.newportvermontdailyexpress.com			
Malvern Daily Record	business.malvern-online.com			
Southern Rhode Island Newspapers	business.ricentral.com			
Wapakoneta Daily News	business.wapakdailynews.com			
Times Record	business.times-online.com			
The Guymon Daily Herald	business.guymondailyherald.com			
Daily Times Leader	business.dailytimesleader.com			
The Ridgway Record	business.ridgwayrecord.com			
Big Spring Herald	business.bigspringherald.com			
The Observer News Enterprise	business.observernewsonline.com			
The Saline Courier	business.bentoncourier.com			
The Buffalo News	markets.buffalonews.com			
The Community Post	business.minstercommunitypost.com			

==== PAPERWALL ====
Shenzhen Haimaiyunxiang Media Co., Ltd., a Chinese public relations firm, is linked to an influence campaign (titled "PAPERWALL" by Citizen Lab) to "[disseminate] pro-Beijing disinformation and ad hominem attacks". Citizen Lab concludes that their analysis "[confirms] the increasingly important role private firms play in the realm of digital influence operations and the propensity of the Chinese government to make use of them."

Name	Domain	Status	Notes	Sources
usa-aa.com	usa-aa.com			
doloreshoy.co	doloreshoy.co			
splinsider.com	splinsider.com			
garagumsowda.com	garagumsowda.com			
laplatapost.com	laplatapost.com			
lujanexpresar.com	lujanexpresar.com			
wienbuzz.com	wienbuzz.com			
boicpost.com	boicpost.com			
brasilindustry.com	brasilindustry.com			
brmingpao.com	brmingpao.com			
financeiropost.com	financeiropost.com			
goiasmine.com	goiasmine.com			
pauloexpressar.com	pauloexpressar.com			
pernambucostar.com	pernambucostar.com			
rioninepage.com	rioninepage.com			
swisshubnews.com	swisshubnews.com			
sanrafaelscoop.com	sanrafaelscoop.com			
martapost.com	martapost.com			
bohemiadaily.com	bohemiadaily.com			
frankfurtsta.com	frankfurtsta.com			
munichnp.com	munichnp.com			
dkindustry.co	dkindustry.co			
lguazu.com	lguazu.com			
andregaceta.com	andregaceta.com			
cordovapress.org	cordovapress.org			
Sevilla Times	sevillatimes.com			
tarragonapost.com	tarragonapost.com			
guellherald.com	guellherald.com			
suomiexpress.com	suomiexpress.com			
frnewsfeed.com	frnewsfeed.com			
froneplus.com	froneplus.com			
friendlyparis.com	friendlyparis.com			
alpsbiz.com	alpsbiz.com			
economyfr.com	economyfr.com			
eiffelpost.com	eiffelpost.com			
fftribune.com	fftribune.com			
louispress.org	louispress.org			
provencedaily.com	provencedaily.com			
rmtcityfr.com	rmtcityfr.com			
doyletimes.com	doyletimes.com			
Napoli Money	napolimoney.com			
Italia Finanziarie	italiafinanziarie.com			
Milano Moda Weekly	milanomodaweekly.com			
Roma Journal	romajournal.org			
Torino Human	torinohuman.com			
Venezia Post	veneziapost.com			
dy-press.com	dy-press.com			
Fujiyama Times	fujiyamatimes.com			
fukuitoday.com	fukuitoday.com			
fukuoka-ken.com	fukuoka-ken.com			
ginzadaily.com	ginzadaily.com			
hokkaidotr.com	hokkaidotr.com			
kanagawa-ken.com	kanagawa-ken.com			
meiji-mura.com	meiji-mura.com			
nihondaily.com	nihondaily.com			
nikkonews.com	nikkonews.com			
saitama-ken.com	saitama-ken.com			
sendaishimbun.com	sendaishimbun.com			
tokushima-ken.com	tokushima-ken.com			
tokyobuilder.com	tokyobuilder.com			
yamatocore.com	yamatocore.com			
bucheontech.com	bucheontech.com			
busanonline.com	busanonline.com			
cctimes.org	cctimes.org			
chungjutravel.com	chungjutravel.com			
chungnamonline.com	chungnamonline.com			
daegujournal.com	daegujournal.com			
daejeontraffic.com	daejeontraffic.com			
gangwonculture.com	gangwonculture.com			
gwangjuedu.com	gwangjuedu.com			
gyeonggidaily.com	gyeonggidaily.com			
gyeongpe.com	gyeongpe.com			
incheonfocus.com	incheonfocus.com			
jejutr.com	jejutr.com			
jeontoday.com	jeontoday.com			
krectimes.com	krectimes.com			
seoulpr.com	seoulpr.com			
ulsanindustry.com	ulsanindustry.com			
gauljournal.com	gauljournal.com			
olmecpress.com	olmecpress.com			
teotihuacaneco.com	teotihuacaneco.com			
xochimilcolife.com	xochimilcolife.com			
greaterdutch.com	greaterdutch.com			
nlpress.org	nlpress.org			
vikingun.org	vikingun.org			
bydgoszczdaily.com	bydgoszczdaily.com			
wawelexpress.com	wawelexpress.com			
ptnavigat.com	ptnavigat.com			
baleadimineata.com	baleadimineata.com			
rogazette.com	rogazette.com			
aksaydaily.com	aksaydaily.com			
ekaterintech.com	ekaterintech.com			
findmoscow.com	findmoscow.com			
gorodbusiness.com	gorodbusiness.com			
kazanculture.com	kazanculture.com			
rostovlife.com	rostovlife.com			
samaraindustry.com	samaraindustry.com			
stptb.org	stptb.org			
tulunet.com	tulunet.com			
volgogradpost.com	volgogradpost.com			
balasaguntimes.com	balasaguntimes.com			
ismoili.com	ismoili.com			
buranadaily.com	buranadaily.com			
wakhan.org	wakhan.org			
luddpress.com	luddpress.com			
kopetbiz.com	kopetbiz.com			
balasagunherald.com	balasagunherald.com			
taurustimes.com	taurustimes.com			
anadoluha.com	anadoluha.com			
araratdaily.com	araratdaily.com			
cappadociapost.org	cappadociapost.org			
bmhtoday.com	bmhtoday.com			
benmorning.com	benmorning.com			
britishft.com	britishft.com			
conanfinance.com	conanfinance.com			
deiniolnews.com	deiniolnews.com			
euleader.org	euleader.org			
glasgowtr.com	glasgowtr.com			
londonclup.com	londonclup.com			
ulstergrowth.com	ulstergrowth.com			
vtnay.org	vtnay.org			
wdpp.org	wdpp.org			
updatenews.info	updatenews.info			

==== Glassbridge ====
Glassbridge, dubbed by Google Threat Intelligence Group, is an information operation that ties together three marketing firms based in China (Shanghai Haixun Technology Co., Ltd, Shenzhen Haimai Yunxiang Media, and Shenzhen Bowen Media, plus an unspecified fourth company) to a network of over 1,000 impostor news websites that support the Chinese government and target audiences in at least 30 countries, including the Chinese diaspora. Some content posted on these sites overlaps with the Spamouflage disinformation operation.

Name	Domain	Status	Notes	Sources
Boston Journal			Not to be confused with the Boston Journal, a 19th-20th century newspaper from the United States.	
Conversa Do Brasil				
Deutsches Journal				

==== Happytify network (歡享網) ====
Name	Domain	Status	Notes	Sources
Happytify / Huanxiangwang	happytify.cc		A content farm network by a Chinese marketing firm, Wuwei Technologies (無為科技). Accused of plagiarism from major news outlets. Posted anti-Democratic Progressive Party articles that were described in a joint report by Graphika, Institute for the Future and the International Republican Institute as "sensational and false". Seen by researchers as an example of "cognitive warfare" by the Chinese government.	

=== Philippines ===
Fake news sites have become rampant for Philippine audiences, especially being shared on social media. Politicians have started filing laws to combat fake news and three Senate hearings have been held on the topic.

The Catholic Church in the Philippines has also released a missive speaking out against it.

Vera Files research at the end of 2017 and 2018 show that the most shared fake news in the Philippines appeared to benefit 2 people the most: Former President Rodrigo Duterte (as well as his allies) and President Bongbong Marcos, with the most viral news driven by shares on networks of Facebook pages. Most Philippine audience Facebook pages and groups spreading online disinformation also bear "Duterte", "Marcos" or "News" in their names and are pro-Duterte. Online disinformation in the Philippines is overwhelmingly political as well, with most attacking groups or individuals critical of the Duterte administration. Many Philippine-audience fake news websites also appear to be controlled by the same operators as they share common Google AdSense and Google Analytics IDs.

According to media scholar Jonathan Corpus Ong, Duterte's presidential campaign is regarded as the patient zero in the current era of disinformation, having preceded widespread global coverage of the Cambridge Analytica scandal and Russian trolls. Fake news is so established and severe in the Philippines that Facebook's Global Politics and Government Outreach Director Katie Harbath also calls it "patient zero" in the global misinformation epidemic, having happened before Brexit, the Donald Trump nomination and the 2016 United States elections.

=== Republic of China ===
==== Mission (密訊) ====
Mission is a content farm that has repeatedly published false information and republished or rephrased stories from other outlets, especially the China Times. It is connected to Lin Cheng-kuo (林正國), a former assistant for Wang Ping-chung (王炳忠), a spokesperson for the New Party. The network uses "link wheeling" to manipulate search engine rankings by Google and Bing, and repeatedly switched domain names to get ahead of bans by Facebook (including the use of beeper.live, a content farm in Malaysia). Mission has promoted content from The Reacher (觸極者), a site also run by Lin, and both sites in turn promoted a China-Taiwan exchange program jointly managed by the Taiwan Affairs Office, several state-run media outlets in China (China Media Group, iTaiwan News Network (海峽飛虹中文網), Huaxia.net (華夏經緯網), Sichuan Daily New Media Centre (四川日報新媒體中心)), and a private media company based in Taiwan.

Name	Domain	Status	Notes	Sources
Mission (密訊)	Mission.tw			
Mission (密訊)	pplomo.com			
Mission (密訊)	mission-tw.com			
Mission (密訊)	missiback.com			
Mission (密訊)	mission-hosti.com			
Mission (密訊)	tiksomo.com			
Mission (密訊)	gufunnews.com			
Mission (密訊)	new.mission-tw.com			
Mission (密訊)	gaochuji.com			
Mission (密訊)	mission-new.com			
Mission (密訊)	tiksomo.com			
Mission (密訊)	falotat.com			
Mission (密訊)	osometalk.com			
Mission (密訊)	itaiwan.mission-tw.com			

=== South Africa ===
==== Radical Economic Transformation media network ====
A network of websites, dubbed the Radical Economic Transformation media network by the African Network of Centers for Investigative Reporting and described by journalists as "disinformation" and "propaganda", promoted the concept of white monopoly capital and repeatedly and anonymously attacked Cyril Ramaphosa, journalists, opposition politicians and other critics of the Gupta family, Jacob Zuma and their associates. The sites were registered by CNET Infosystem, an Indian reputation management firm that is linked to the Gupta family, who had close ties with Zuma. As of 2017, they received nearly all of their web traffic from users in India, and were linked to pro-Gupta and pro-Zuma Twitter accounts whose posts were retweeted by bot accounts. This network of websites and social media assets also included media outlets owned by the Gupta family: ANN7 and The New Age. The overall social media strategy was analyzed by Bell Pottinger, who was contracted by the Gupta family. The New York Times noted that, due to the disinformation campaign, "racial tensions [in South Africa] rose to levels that had not been felt since apartheid" and asserted that the campaign significantly damaged the cause of advancing economic equality for Black South Africans.

Name	Domain	Status	Notes	Sources
dodgysaministers.com	dodgysaministers.com			
fakeguptaleaks.com	fakeguptaleaks.com			
publicopinion.co.za	publicopinion.co.za			
southafricabuzz.co.za	southafricabuzz.co.za			
whitemonopoly.com	whitemonopoly.com			
whitemonopolyafrica.com	whitemonopolyafrica.com			
whitemonopolycapital.com	whitemonopolycapital.com			
WMC Leaks	wmcleaks.com		Per Africa Check, an IFCN signatory.	
WMC Scams	wmcscams.com			
wmc-scams.com	wmc-scams.com			

=== Spain ===
Name	Domain	Status	Notes	Sources
Euskal News	euskalnews.com		Connected to Basque politician David Pasarin-Gegunde. Described by ProPublica as "a Google publishing partner that mixes anti-immigrant content and vaccine disinformation with warnings of an impending globalist and EU takeover." A 2022 analysis by ProPublica found many advertisements that had been placed by Google, which were removed upon contact by ProPublica.	

=== Sweden ===
Name	Domain	Status	Notes	Sources
The Nordic Times	nordictimes.com		Connected to Nya Dagbladet.	
Nya Dagbladet	nyadagbladet.se		Identified by researchers at the Oxford Internet Institute as a source of "junk news". Reportedly linked to Nationaldemokraterna. Accused of spreading anti-vaccine misinformation, Holocaust denial, and the white genocide conspiracy theory. Promoted a document falsely alleged to be from the RAND Corporation.	
Nyheter Idag	nyheteridag.se		Identified by researchers at the Oxford Internet Institute as a source of "junk news". Closely associated with the Sweden Democrats. Founded by Chang Frick, who is described as "a former Sweden Democrat official" and has also worked for RT. Connected to Kent Ekeroth and Jeppe Juhl. Owned by Ilan Sadé.	
Samnytt	samnytt.se		Identified by researchers at the Oxford Internet Institute as a source of "junk news". Works with AdStyle, which uses ads with fictitious celebrity endorsements. Closely associated with the Sweden Democrats, receiving donations from Kent Ekeroth. A writer for the site who used to work for the Sweden Democrats was denied parliamentary press accreditation after Swedish security police concluded that he was associated with Russian intelligence.	

=== Tanzania ===
Between 2020 and 2021, a network of Twitter accounts was used by "[Tanzanian-]government aligned individuals" supportive of the Chama Cha Mapinduzi (CCM) party to harass activists, journalists, and Tanzanian opposition politicians. The campaign was possibly "partially outsourced to a Russian-speaking country", and involved false copyright campaigns: Twitter content that criticized the CCM party was added to blog sites (listed below) and back dated, and then the original content was reported to Twitter under the Digital Millennium Copyright Act. This network was suspended by Twitter in 2021 for coordinated inauthentic behavior.

Name	Domain	Status	Notes	Sources
AfricaTopNews	africatopnews.blogspot.com			
Covid Tanzania	covidtanzania.wordpress.com			
NewsTzOlivia	newstzolivia.wordpress.com			

=== Tunisia ===
==== Operation Carthage ====
An influence operation, dubbed Operation Carthage by the Digital Forensics Research Lab, was conducted in an attempt to influence the 2019 Tunisian presidential election. The operation was conducted by UReputation, a Tunisian public relations firm linked to Lotfi Bel Hadj. The campaign had also attempted to influence politics in Comoros (2019 Comorian presidential election), Côte d'Ivoire (2020 Ivorian presidential election), and Togo (2020 Togolese presidential election). The company also had assets in Chad, Congo-Brazzaville, Gambia, Guinea, Mali, Madagascar, Niger, and Senegal. Related social media accounts and pages were taken down by Facebook in 2020 for coordinated inauthentic behavior.

Name	Domain	Status	Notes	Sources
Actu France	Actu-France.com		Has blank "About Page".	
Afrika News	afrika-news.com		Journalists listed have accounts that are suspended by Twitter, and otherwise have no identifiable digital footprint. Supportive of Faure Gnassingbé.	
Afrikan Post	afrikanpost.fr		Has similar website design as Revue de l'Afrique and Afrika News. Journalists listed have no identifiable digital footprint. Copies content from other news websites.	
Eco Mag	eco-mag.com		Journalists listed have accounts that are suspended by Twitter, and otherwise have no identifiable digital footprint.	
Fake News Checking	fakenewschecking.com		Connected to UReputation. Presented itself as a fact-checking outlet.	
Le Muslim Post	lemuslimpost.com		Funded by Lotfi Bel Hadj.	
Maghreb Info	Maghreb-Info.com		Has similar website design as Revue de l'Afrique and Afrika News. Journalists listed have accounts that are suspended by Twitter, and otherwise have no identifiable digital footprint. Supportive of Nabil Karoui.	
Revue de L'Afrique	revue-afrique.com		Journalists listed have accounts that are suspended by Twitter, and otherwise have no identifiable digital footprint. Supportive of Faure Gnassingbé.	

=== Ukraine ===
Name	Domain	Status	Notes	Sources
Begemot.com	Begemot.com		Linked to Andrii Derkach, Petro Zhuravel, and political consultants tied to Volodymyr Groysman and Oleh Kulinich. Part of a network that was taken down by Facebook in 2021 for coordinated inauthentic behavior.	
Begemot.media	Begemot.media		Linked to Andrii Derkach, Petro Zhuravel, and political consultants tied to Volodymyr Groysman and Oleh Kulinich. Part of a network that was taken down by Facebook in 2021 for coordinated inauthentic behavior.	
Begemot.news	Begemot.news		Linked to Andrii Derkach, Petro Zhuravel, and political consultants tied to Volodymyr Groysman and Oleh Kulinich. Part of a network that was taken down by Facebook in 2021 for coordinated inauthentic behavior.	
thickpolicy.media	thickpolicy.media		Linked to Andrii Derkach, Petro Zhuravel, and political consultants tied to Volodymyr Groysman and Oleh Kulinich. Part of a network that was taken down by Facebook in 2021 for coordinated inauthentic behavior.	

==== Luhansk ====
The following websites are part of a network that has been alleged to have links to NewsFront, Borotba, and individuals in Russian-occupied Luhansk. Related social media accounts were taken down by Facebook in 2021 for coordinated inauthentic behavior.

Name	Domain	Status	Notes	Sources
capitalnews.us	capitalnews.us			
Le Tarde Republicana	Tarde-republicana.es			
esrepublica.es	esrepublica.es			
tribuno-popolare.it	tribuno-popolare.it			
bagimsizbasin.info.tr	bagimsizbasin.info.tr			
Szeged Hírek	szegedhir.eu			
incident24-7.ru	incident24-7.ru			
massmedia24.com	massmedia24.com			
9may.org	9may.org			
hadashot-erev.info	hadashot-erev.info			
Pravdorub	pravdorub.md			
Echo of Moldova	eho.md			
Echo of Moldova	ehomd.info			
Kyrgyzstan Echo	ehokg.org		Journalists listed have no identifiable digital footprint.	
Kyrgyzstan Echo	ehokg.info		Journalists listed have no identifiable digital footprint.	
Kazakhstan Echo	ehonews.kz		Journalists listed have no identifiable digital footprint.	
24-7 News	24-7news.eu		Copied content from Euronews, NewsFront and The Epoch Times. Promoted a claim accusing Ukraine of environmental pollution, which Graphika described as a "trope of Russian propaganda, Ukraine as a nuclear disaster".	
britisherald.org.uk	britisherald.org.uk		Promoted a claim accusing Ukraine of environmental pollution, which Graphika described as a "trope of Russian propaganda, Ukraine as a nuclear disaster".	
European group of action 'Ecology and peace'	ecoandpeace.eu			
Abendlich Hamburg	abend-hamburg.de	Defunct		
The Capital News	capital-news.org.uk		Accused by Graphika of information laundering.	
summurynews.com	summurynews.com		Alleged by Die Welt and netzpolitik.org to be a "sister" site for NewsFront.	
central.Asia-news.com	central.Asia-news.com			
Courrier Parisien	parisien-courrier.fr			
Infoprof	infoprof.su			

=== United Arab Emirates ===
Name	Domain	Status	Notes	Sources
iraqonlinenews.com	iraqonlinenews.com		According to the Stanford Internet Observatory, linked to digital marketing firms DotDev (based in Egypt and the United Arab Emirates) and Smatt (based in Saudi Arabia). Related social media posts and accounts were removed and shut down by Facebook and Twitter between 2019 and 2020 over coordinated inauthentic behavior. Part of a network of website domains shared on Twitter posts from a state-sponsored disinformation campaign from Egypt and the United Arab Emirates.	
Somalianow	somalianow.com		According to Digital Forensics Research Lab, linked to Newave, a public relations and marketing firm based in the United Arab Emirates. According to the Stanford Internet Observatory, linked to digital marketing firms DotDev (based in Egypt and the United Arab Emirates) and Smatt (based in Saudi Arabia). Related social media posts and accounts were removed and shut down by Facebook and Twitter between 2019 and 2020 over coordinated inauthentic behavior. Part of a network of website domains shared on Twitter posts from a state-sponsored disinformation campaign from Egypt and the United Arab Emirates.	
mauritanialive.com	mauritanialive.com		According to the Stanford Internet Observatory, linked to digital marketing firms DotDev (based in Egypt and the United Arab Emirates) and Smatt (based in Saudi Arabia). Related social media posts and accounts were removed and shut down by Facebook and Twitter between 2019 and 2020 over coordinated inauthentic behavior. Part of a network of website domains shared on Twitter posts from a state-sponsored disinformation campaign from Egypt and the United Arab Emirates. Includes an Emirati flag in its banner, which, according to the Stanford Internet Observatory, suggests a connection to the United Arab Emirates.	
Palastine Alyoum	palestinealyoum.com		According to the Stanford Internet Observatory, linked to digital marketing firms DotDev (based in Egypt and the United Arab Emirates) and Smatt (based in Saudi Arabia). Related social media posts and accounts were removed and shut down by Facebook and Twitter between 2019 and 2020 over coordinated inauthentic behavior. Part of a network of website domains shared on Twitter posts from a state-sponsored disinformation campaign from Egypt and the United Arab Emirates.	
moroccosnews.com	moroccosnews.com		According to the Stanford Internet Observatory, linked to digital marketing firms DotDev (based in Egypt and the United Arab Emirates) and Smatt (based in Saudi Arabia). Related social media posts and accounts were removed and shut down by Facebook and Twitter between 2019 and 2020 over coordinated inauthentic behavior. Part of a network of website domains shared on Twitter posts from a state-sponsored disinformation campaign from Egypt and the United Arab Emirates.	
Algeria Today	algeriatodays.com		According to the Stanford Internet Observatory, linked to digital marketing firms DotDev (based in Egypt and the United Arab Emirates) and Smatt (based in Saudi Arabia). Related social media posts and accounts were removed and shut down by Facebook and Twitter between 2019 and 2020 over coordinated inauthentic behavior. Part of a network of website domains shared on Twitter posts from a state-sponsored disinformation campaign from Egypt and the United Arab Emirates.	

=== United Kingdom ===
Name	Domain	Status	Notes	Sources
The Conservative Woman (TCW Defending Freedom)	conservativewoman.co.uk		Accused by the Global Disinformation Index of spreading misogynistic disinformation. Accused by DeSmog of spreading climate change denial. Linked to News-watch and The Global Warming Policy Foundation. Co-founded and co-edited by Laura Perrins. Promoted vaccine misinformation and COVID-19 misinformation. John Longworth contributed to the site.	
News-watch	news-watch.co.uk		Associated with Leave.EU, whose website is noted by DeSmog to solicit donations for News-watch. Publishes climate change denialism.	
Unity News Network	unitynewsnetwork.co.uk		Accused by the Global Disinformation Index of publishing climate change disinformation. Run by a youth leader of Ukip. Described by The Guardian as a "conspiracy theory website" in an article noting their role in the 2024 United Kingdom riots.	

=== United States ===
Prominent networks of sites by political campaigns in the United States include Courier, Local Report (connected to The American Independent), Metric Media (run by Brian Timpone), and Star News Digital Media (co-founded by Tea Party-affiliated activists.)

=== Multinational ===
==== Qiqi News Network ====
Qiqi News Network is a content farm based in Malaysia, owned by Yee Kok Wai (余國威) and Evan Lee, that has been accused by researchers of publishing disinformation that favored the Chinese Communist Party prior to the 2020 Taiwanese general election, often spread over Line. It spread a false story that COVID-19 originated in the United States. The network was noted in a joint report by Graphika, Institute for the Future and the International Republican Institute to "[push] a worldview closely aligned with the CCP, frequently [use] mainland Chinese phrasings, and [recycle] articles from other news outlets, often Chinese state-owned media." Several stories and website domains promoted by the network have been alleged, by Twitter and Audrey Tang of Taiwan's Ministry of Digital Affairs to be linked directly to the government of the People's Republic of China. At least one member of the Chinese Unification Promotion Party, Chang Dong-nan (張東南), joined Yee's Facebook group, Global Chinese Alliance (全球華人聯盟), in 2014.

Name	Domain	Status	Notes	Sources
Qiqi News Network	qiqi.today			
Qiqi News Network	cnba.live			
Qiqi News Network	kikis.xyz			
Qiqi News Network	orgs.pub			
Qiqi News Network	orgs.one			
Qiqi News Network	qiqi77.online			
Qiqi News Network	i77.today			
Qiqi News Network	Mybezza.live			
Qiqi News Network	orgs.host			
Qiqi News Network	orgs.press			
Qiqi News Network	twgreatdaily.live			
Qiqi News Network	reurl.cc			
Qiqi News Network	defense.rocks			
Qiqi News Network	kikiz.xyz			
Qiqi News Network	ititi.pro			
Qiqi News Network	iqiqi.pro			
Qiqi News Network	ikiki.xyz			
Qiqi News Network (KanWatch)	kanwatch.best			
Qiqi News Network	kanwatch.com			
Qiqi News Network	kanwatch.site			
Qiqi News Network	kanwatch.club			
Qiqi News Network	kanwatch.live			
Qiqi News Network	qiqis.net			
Qiqi News Network	iqiqis.com			
Qiqi News Network	kanwatch.me			
Qiqi News Network	yxfashao.com			
Qiqi News Network	ptttube.com			
Qiqi News Network	allqiqi.com			
Qiqi News Network	qiqis.org			
Qiqi News Network	newqiqi.com			
Qiqi News Network	My-love.org			
Qiqi News Network	kanwatch.fun			
Qiqi News Network	ilovestory.net			
Qiqi News Network	lifehow.cc			
Qiqi News Network	qiqu.world			
Qiqi News Network	vivi81.com			
Qiqi News Network	7qiqi7.com			
Qiqi News Network	iyiyi.online			
Qiqi News Network	ixixi.pro			
Qiqi News Network	ipipi.me			
Qiqi News Network	klkq.site			
Qiqi News Network	qiqis.xyz			
Qiqi News Network	7qi.site			
Qiqi News Network	littlepet.cc			
Qiqi News Network	funnytuu.com			
Qiqi News Network	gamefan.cc			
Qiqi News Network	dragontechs.live			
Qiqi News Network	kanwatch.press			
Qiqi News Network	qiqi.world			
Qiqi News Network	lifeknowledge.com			
Qiqi News Network	skh.world			
Qiqi News Network	ipipi.co			
Jintian Toutiao (今天頭條)				
beeper.live	beeper.live			
Qiqu News (奇趣網)				
Global Chinese Weather Union (全球華人風雲聯盟)	globalcafyun.orgs.one			
Global Chinese Taiwan Union (全球華人台灣聯盟)	globalct.orgs.one			
Huiqi Worldview (慧琪世界觀)				
Qiqi Military (琦琦看軍事)				
Qiqi Life (琪琪看生活)				
Qiqi News (琦琦看新聞)				
Ghost Island Mad News (鬼島狂新聞)	taiwan-madnews.com			
Ghost Island Mad News (鬼島狂新聞)	ghostislandmadnews.com			

==== Voice of Europe ====
Name	Domain	Status	Notes	Sources
Voice of Europe	voiceofeurope.com		Identified by researchers at the Oxford Internet Institute as a source of "junk news". Accused by the Czech Foreign Ministry of having an influence operation in Europe, funded by Viktor Medvedchuk. Hyperlinks to Nyheter Idag, Samhallsnytt, Fria Tider and Nya Tider.	

=== Unknown ===
==== Operation Red Card ====
Operation Red Card, dubbed by Graphika, is part of a network that was taken down by Facebook in 2020 for coordinated inauthentic behavior. It was attributed by Facebook to aRep Global, a digital marketing firm in India. The campaign was asserted by Graphika to be "a case of online influence for hire, conducted at the behest of a geopolitical actor with concerns in the [Persian Gulf]."

Name	Domain	Status	Notes	Sources
Ask The Truth	AskTruth24.com			
Manchester Weekly	manchesterweeklyuk.wordpress.com			
Mirror Herald	mirrorherald.com			
Raven Tribune	raventribune.com			
True News Source	truenewssource.com			
