= Swatantra =

Swatantra may refer to:

== Religion ==
- Svatantrya, concept in Hinduism
- Svatantrika–Prasaṅgika distinction, doctrinal distinction in Tibetan Buddhism

== Politics ==
- Swatantra Bharat Paksh, a liberal party in Maharashtra, India
- Swatantra Dal, a political party in Sikkim, India
- Swatantra Party, an Indian liberal political party that existed from 1959 to 1974
- Swatantra Tripura Committee, a political coordination committee in Tripura, India
- Swatantra Thozhilali Union, a trade union in India

== People ==
- Swatantra Dev Singh, Indian politician
- Swatanter Kumar, Indian judge
- Swatantra Veer Savarkar, nickname of Indian political activist Vinayak Damodar Savarkar

== Others ==
- Swatantra 2014, fifth international free software conference event, organized at Thiruvananthapuram, Kerala
- Swatantra Nepali, a Nepali-language weekly newspaper in India
- Swatantra Senani Superfast Express, an Indian passenger train between New Delhi and Jaynagar
- Swatantra Theatre, an Indian theatre troupe

== See also ==
- Sontham (disambiguation)
- Swatantrapur, a village in Maharashtra, India
