= Algerian Socialist Labour Party =

Former Algerian political party

Algerian Socialist Labour Party Parti socialiste ouvrier algerien
- Abbreviation: PSOA
- Founded: June 1895
- Dissolved: October 1902
- Succeeded by: Socialist Federation of Algeria
- Newspaper: Le Socialiste
- Ideology: Socialism
- Political position: Left-wing

The Algerian Socialist Labour Party (French: Parti socialiste ouvrier algerien) was a political party in Algeria. The party was founded in 1895 by French socialists in Algeria, ideologically close to the Social Democratic Party of Germany. In 1901 the party published the organ Le Socialiste ('The Socialist') from Alger.

The party held its fifth congress in Constantine October 2–5, 1902. The congress decided to transform the party into an Algerian Socialist Workers Federation, affiliated to the Socialist Party of France.
