= Sontham =

Sontham (lit. 'own' or 'oneself' or 'private') may refer to:

- Sontham (1973 film), an Indian Telugu-language film
- Sontham (2002 film), an Indian Telugu-language film by Srinu Vaitla

== See also ==
- Oneself (disambiguation)
- Swatantra (disambiguation)
- Shondham 16, a 1989 Indian Telugu-language film
