= Socialist Federation of Algeria =

Socialist Federation of Algeria Fédération socialiste d'Algérie
- Founder: Maxime Guillon
- Founded: 1908
- Headquarters: Algiers
- Newspaper: Le Cri du Peuple
- Ideology: Social democracy Democratic socialism Anti-Native code
- Political position: Left-wing
- National affiliation: SFIO

The Socialist Federation of Algeria (French: Fédération socialiste d'Algérie) was the branch of the French Socialist Party (SFIO) in Algeria. The Federation was founded in 1908.

== See also ==
- Oran socialiste
