= AUF1 (channel) =

Austrian far-right media platform

- Website type: Conspiracy theories and misinformation
- Available in: German
- Owner: Stefan Magnet
- Creator: Stefan Magnet
- Editor: Stefan Magnet
- Key people: Stefan Magnet (CEO and editor-in-chief); Elsa Mittmannsgruber (editor)
- Website: auf1.tv
- Commercial: Yes
- Registration: No
- Launched: 31 May 2021; 5 years ago
- Current status: Active

AUF1 is an Austrian far-right channel. It was founded in June 2021 by Stefan Magnet and has an audience in Austria and Germany. The channel promotes conspiracy theories and misinformation. The channel openly praises and support the parties AfD and FPÖ. In 2022, the Austrian media authority Komm Austria initiated proceedings against AUF1.

== History ==
The main personnel of AUF1 had far-right activist backgrounds. AUF1 boss Stefan Magnet was a manager at the Bund freier Jugend (BfJ), a right-wing extremist youth organization from Austria. Andreas Retschitzegger, the program manager for Germany, is also a former BfJ squad who was also active in the FPÖ youth organization Ring Freiheitlicher Jugend Österreich.

Stefan Magnet founded the channel during the COVID-19 pandemic. On 31 May 2021, AUF1 went online for the first time with a contribution. The station is based in Austria but addresses all German-speaking countries. The ordinance has increased rapidly since the TV channel was founded, and since the end of 2022 the station is one of the largest "alternative media" for the COVID-denier movement (Querdenker) and the milieu of conspiracy ideology. In the summer of 2022, it became known that AUF1 wanted to set up a permanent editorial team in Berlin, which would be headed by Martin Müller-Mertens. Müller-Mertens was previously TV boss of the right-wing extremist German magazine Compact. He said that the "focus of reporting is increasingly being shifted to Germany".

The Austrian media authority Komm Austria announced in November 2022 that it had initiated proceedings concerning AUF1 on suspicion of broadcasting without a license. Komm Austria wrote that "content obviously designed by AUF1 is broadcast as part of the terrestrial RTV program in the Linz area". RTV is a local commercial Austria TV station. However, AUF1 probably never submitted a license application.

In 2023, AUF1 began broadcasting across Europe via an Astra satellite channel via the channel of a German company called “schwarz rot gold tv” (SRGT) based in Baden-Württemberg. The head of SRGT is the COVID denier and AfD sympathizer Wilfried Geissler. SRGT has signed a contract with a company from the AUF1 network. When the construct became known, the responsible media authority in Baden-Württemberg (LfK) banned further broadcasting via the Astra satellite with immediate effect in November 2023. On 28 February 2024, the authority imposed a fine totaling €195,000 on SRGT for the unauthorized transmission of AUF1 program content between September and November 2023.

== Program content ==
AUF1's program content is frequently classified as misinformation. The channel denies the danger of COVID-19 and represents everything in this context as a conspiracy of an "elite" that is not described in detail. According to Magnet, Google, the World Economic Forum, the LGBTQI+ movement, and genetic engineers are all working to destroy humanity.

Magnet promotes anti-semitic content via AUF1 and its Telegram channel. When the media reported about it, Magnet accused UNESCO, the EU Commission and the World Jewish Congress of a defamation campaign.

In line with its target audience, the station often covers statements from politicians from the German right-wing AfD party and reports on the AfD conventions.

AUF1 is sympathetic to Vladimir Putin's policies and justifies the 2022 Russian invasion of Ukraine. The station promotes Russian propaganda narratives.

Jan Rathje, senior researcher at the Center for Monitoring, Analysis and Strategy (CeMAS), said that the topics covered by AUF1 are part of major world conspiracy narratives. The channel says that everything is "part of a big conspiracy with the aim of wiping out the white population in Europe".

== Financing ==
According to experts, the program is produced at a relatively large financial expense. The presentation is professional. It is not publicly known where the money for the broadcaster's productions comes from. Officially, the station states that it is financed by donations. It also runs an "AUF1 shop" where, among other things, stickers with the inscription "No to compulsory vaccination" are offered. However, experts doubt that this is the only cash flow.

== Network ==
AUF1 broadcasts via live streams and YouTube and also runs a Telegram channel. In Austria, the local TV station RTV broadcasts programs of AUF1.

AUF1 is well connected to other right-wing media outlets, as part of what ORF described as the "Propaganda Cluster from Upper Austria".

AUF1 is connected to "Info-DIREKT" and the newspaper Wochenblick. Editor-in-chief of Wochenblick, Elsa Mittmannsgruber, has her own program at AUF1. The channel was well connected to the German far-right outlet Compact that German authorities shut down in 2024.
