= Oneself =

Oneself is the reflexive form of the pronoun one. It may also refer to:

- Self, an individual person as the object of his or her own reflective consciousness
  - Philosophy of self, which defines the essential qualities that make one person distinct from all others
  - Self-concept, a multi-dimensional construct that refers to an individual's perception of "self" in relation to any number of characteristics
- Identity (social science), the conception and expression of a person's individuality or group affiliations
- Personal identity
- Oneself (rapper), an American hip hop artist based in Milwaukee, Wisconsin

== See also ==
- Sontham (disambiguation)
