= Lotfi Bel Hadj =

French-Tunisian businessman (born June 19, 1964)

- Born: June 19, 1964 (age 62)
- Education: Institute of Islamic Studies of Paris

Lotfi Bel Hadj (born June 19, 1964) is a French-Tunisian essayist, economist, and businessman. Born in Saint-Denis, he is the nephew of the former President of Tunisia Moncef Marzouki.

== Biography ==
Lotfi Bel Hadj is a former auditor at the Institute for Advanced Studies in Science and Technology. He graduated from the Institute of Islamic Studies of Paris before chairing the Economic Observatory of the Suburbs.

Under the presidency of Zine El Abidine Ben Ali, in 2005, he attempted to work in Tunisia but was not allowed to. His companies were confiscated and he was not allowed to enter the Tunisian territory. After Ben Ali's ousting in 2011, Bel Hadj moved closer to the far-right party, Ennahdha.

For Lotfi Bel Hadj :

The economic development of Tunisia could only be achieved through new foundations: not through FMist, pseudo-democratic and ultraliberal principles.

According to French journalist Nicolas Beau, Bel Hadj was able to work with two of Ben Ali's nephews after the end of his rule, and to reach Rached Ghannouchi, the leader of Ennahdha. In the case of Tariq Ramadan, Bel Hadj showed an active support to the Islamologist:

Tariq Ramadan is the typical example of someone who has given back to Muslims, whether they like or not.

According to a journalist at the Swiss daily newspaper Le Temps, with Le Muslim Post, whose editor-in-chief is Yunes Bel Hadj, Lotfi Bel Hadj's son, the latter "has a major channel of influence." In relation to the Tariq Ramadan affair, Bel Hadj also suggested the replacement of Yassine Bouzrou by Emmanuel Marsigny to defend Ramadan. In an interview granted to the Tribune de Genève on April 28, 2018, Lotfi Bel Hadj stated:

It is not Tariq Ramadan that I'm defending. It is the presumption of innocence and the Muslims

On March 12, 2019, Bel Hadj's foundation organized a symposium on political communication in Tunis, with the participation of experts such as Thierry Saussez (former adviser of Jacques Chirac, Alain Juppé’ and Nicolas Sarkozy), Emmanuel Dupuy (President of the Foresight and Security Institute in Europe), Jean-Christophe Gallien (professor at Paris-Sorbonne University) and Marc Bousquet (specialist in institutional communication and politics with African and French leaders).

In March 2019, Jeune Afrique released that Bel Hadj is in talks with Tahya Tounes, the new political party of Youssef Chahed the Tunisian Prime Minister, for possible collaboration in view of the upcoming elections.

=== Essayist ===
In 2011, Bel Hadj published a book on forest-based carbon credits entitled L’Afrique et Son Capital.

In 2015, he published La Bible du Halal, a book in which he presented a detailed survey on Halal economy.

He is the author of several articles published by Libération, L’Obs and the Huffington Post.

=== UReputation ===
Lotfi Bel Hadj is the founder of the reputation agency ‘UReputation’, specialized in online lobbying and includes 75 employees in Tunisia. Some operations, like the ‘Operation Carthage’, have been open to debate.

On June 9, 2020, after an investigation conducted by the American research laboratory Digital Forensic Research lab (DFRLab), Facebook closed 446 pages and 96 groups administered on the social network by UReputation. They claimed that they were aimed at influencing elections through infox in French-speaking Africa.

In February 2022, Jean-Baptiste Soufron, a lawyer specialized in public and digital liberties and the first legal director of the Wikimedia Foundation, expressed through the press, as a defense of UReputation, that he was attacking Facebook for personal data violation. The social network would have communicated personal data to the Atlantic Council, but also to states, which is considered illegal from a privacy point of view. Tunisia was among the countries that entered the case. The Tunisian judiciary suspected that Facebook illegally used the personal data of employees of the Tunisian company. Business News refers to a report, conducted by an expert commissioned by the Tunisian judiciary, which maintains that UReputation has suffered damages amounting to fourteen million dinars (more than four million euros).

=== PSG Affair ===
In 2018, UReputation managed influence missions for the Paris Saint-Germain Football Club (PSG). Based on documents seized during a search, In October 2022, Mediapart showed that the company Digital Big Brother had created a digital army for influence operations. According to the media, 10% of the accounts managed were considered "influential", making these accounts tools for relaying and ‘contre-feu’. Mediapart maintains that the operation was carried out from 2018 to 2020.

According to a Tunisian specialist in Political Communication, for the Tunisian media Business News, on the subject of e-reputation agencies: "Communication agencies, especially French ones, do not appreciate seeing a Franco-Tunisian involved in the communication market in Africa and consider Bel Hadj as someone who intrudes their domain.
