= Aberystwyth Times =

The Aberystwyth Times
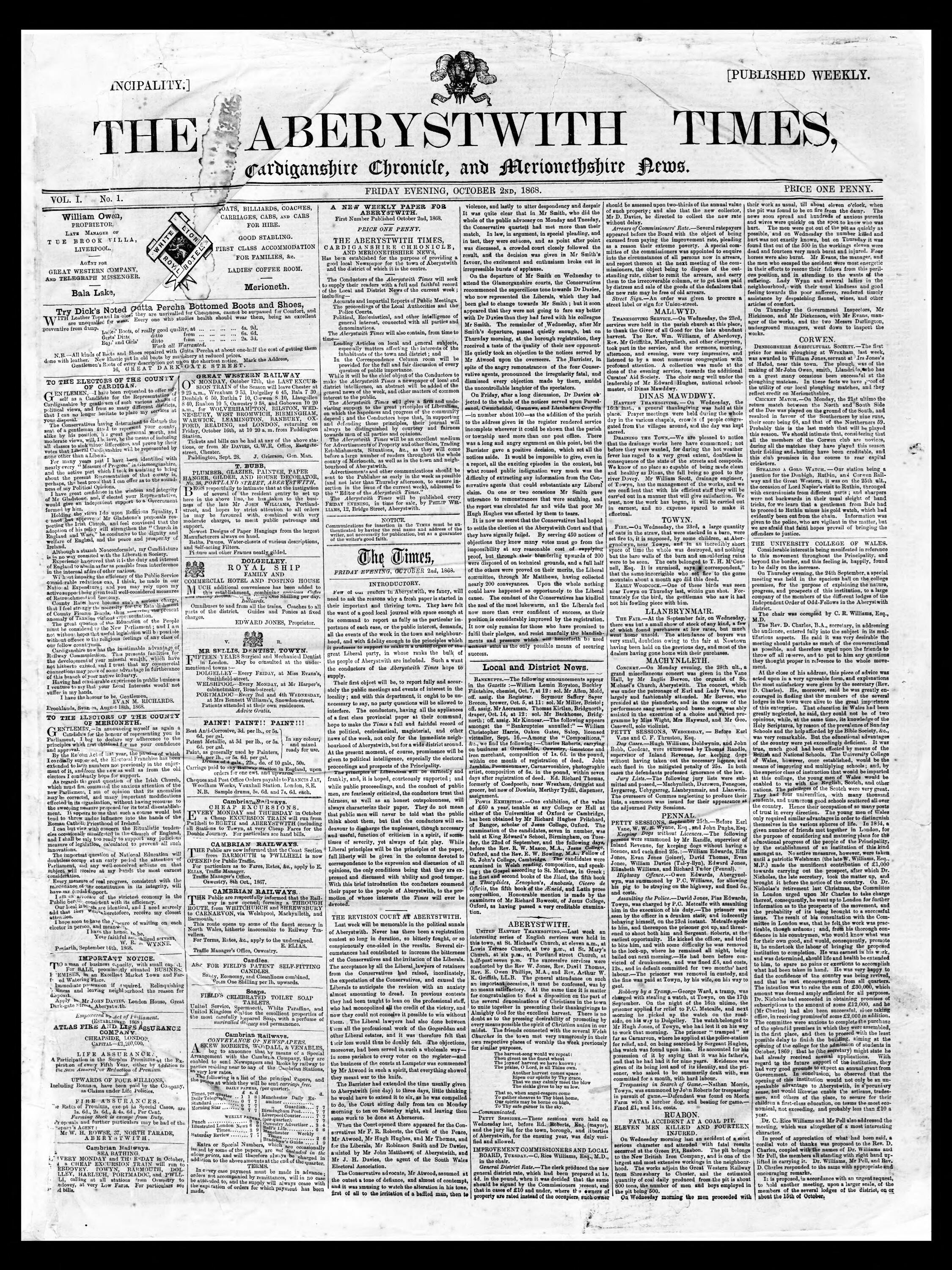
- Founder: Richard Steele
- Language: English
- City: Aberystwyth
- OCLC number: 751651465

The Aberystwyth Times was a weekly newspaper published in Aberystwyth and circulated nationally in Wales, founded by Richard Steele. Most of the paper was in English, with a section in Welsh.

Welsh Newspapers Online has digitised eighty-nine issues of the Aberystwyth Times (1868-1870) from the newspaper holdings of the National Library of Wales.
