= Spöknippet =

Fascist Newspaper

Spöknippet (Swedish for "fascio") was a fascist weekly newspaper in Sweden, published between October 1926 and May 1930. Spöknippet was the main organ of the Fascist Combat Organization of Sweden (SFKO, initially known as the Fascist People's Party of Sweden). The launching of the newspaper came after the Fascist People's Party had ended its links to the publication Nationen.

Konrad Hallgren was the editor of the newspaper. Spöknippet, which appeared on Wednesdays, was edited and printed in Stockholm. In May 1930 it was substituted by a new publication, Nationalsocialisten ('The National Socialist').
