= Leninshil Zhas =

Leninshil Zhas (Kazakh: Лениншіл жас, Lenınshil jas; meaning Lenin's Youth in English) was a newspaper published by the Komsomol of the Kazakh SSR five times a week. The paper was the successor of Zhas kairat, a newspaper established in Tashkent in 1921.

Leninshil Zhas was based in Alma Ata. The paper targeted Kazakh youth.
