= Der Nord-Westen =

Der Nord-Westen ("The North West") was a German language weekly newspaper published in Manitowoc, Wisconsin. It began publication on September 5, 1855, under Carl Schmidt, suspended publication in November 1860, resuming publication in February 1865, and continued publication through 1909.

Manitowoc writer Harold E. Bergman has created a series of extracts from Den Nord-Westen of items of genealogical interest translated into English which are available on the website of the Manitowoc Public Library.
