= List of defunct newspapers of Hartford City, Indiana =

This is a list of newspapers that used to be published in Hartford City, Indiana, USA. Important people in the community's newspaper history are the brothers Frank and Henry Geisler, Edward E. Cox, and the Monfort family including Ralph and John Monfort. Hartford City's current (2009) News-Times is a descendant of the entity created by the merger of the Hartford City News and the Times-Gazette.

- Hartford City Times (1852) First newspaper in Blackford County.
- Blackford County News (1852–1859)
- Register (1856)
- Blackford County Democrat (1857–1861)
- Hartford City Union (1861–1871)
- Hartford City Democrat (1869–1872)
- News (1873–1885)
- Hartford City Courier (1873–1875)
- Hartford City Telegram (1875–1914)
- Hartford City Times (1885–1905)
- Saturday Siftings (1891–1894)
- Hartford City Arena (1891–1895)
- Hartford City Press (1892–1894)
- Evening News (1894–1937) Eventually renamed Hartford City News, this was Hartford City's first daily newspaper.
- Republican (1895–1896)
- Blackford County Gazette (1901–1905) Included a French language column.
- Daily Gazette (1901–1903)
- Times-Gazette (1905–1937)
- Daily Journal (1909–1915)
