= Wochenblick =

Austrian newspaper

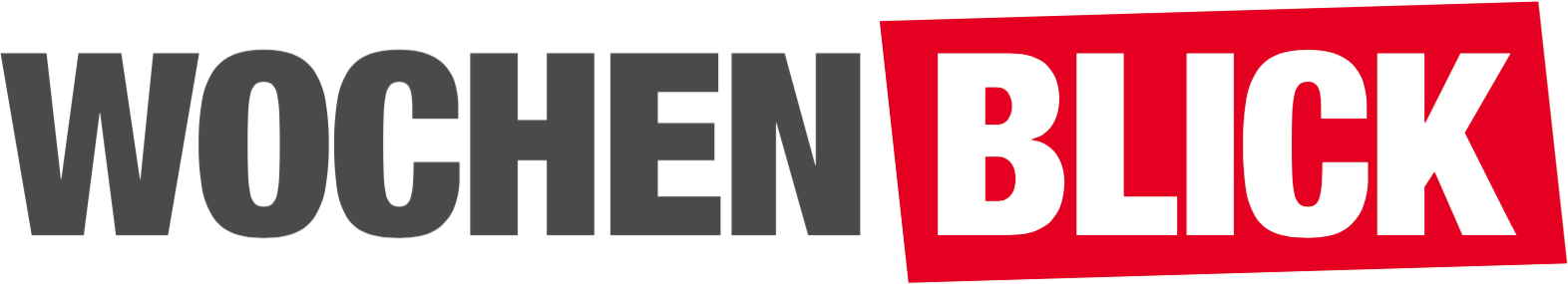
- Type: Weekly newspaper
- Publisher: Medien24 GmbH
- Editor-in-chief: Bernadette Conrads
- Founded: 1 March 2016; 10 years ago
- Political alignment: right-wing populism, anti-vax
- Language: German
- Headquarters: Linz, Austria
- Website: www.wochenblick.at

Wochenblick (Week-review) was an Austrian newspaper that started as a regional weekly journal in Upper Austria. The online version gained attention in the right-wing community of Austria and Germany. The newspaper was closely aligned with the Austrian Freedom Party (FPÖ). The content is often as factually incorrect and suffers from a strong right-wing bias.

In December 2022, Wochenblick announced that it would cease operations due to financial reasons.

== History ==
Wochenblick was founded in March 2016. It was published and the manufactured by Medien24 GmbH, based in Brunnenthal. Emotion Media GmbH is a 100% shareholder. The first editor-in-chief was Kurt Guggenbichler, which had worked for 25 years for Oberösterreichischen Nachrichten. Christian Seibert replaced him on May 4, 2018, followed by Elsa Mittmannsgruber in 2020, and finally by Bernadette Conrads in January 2022. The managing director was Norbert Geroldinger. The newspaper was initially distributed for free in Linz and Wels, both in Upper Austria.

== Bias and Controversies ==
Wochenblick was often accused of repeating right-wing polulistic messages. In 2017, during the German federal election, Wochenblick ran a story titled "Merkel is hoping for 12 million immigrants". This was determined to be false, and no evidence of then-chancellor Angela Merkel saying this was found.

The newspaper was known for spreading COVID-19 misinformation during the pandemic, and was popular with the anti-vax movement.

Former editor-in-chief Elsa Mittmannsgruber also appears on YouTube for the right-wing TV Station AUF1.
