= El Bien del Obrero =

Spanish newspaper

El Bién del Obrero.

El Bien del Obero was a socialist weekly newspaper in Ferrol, Spain. The paper began appearing around 1900.
