= Eesti Aeg =

Estonian newspaper of the early 1990s

Eesti Aeg (Estonian: Time of Estonia) was a newspaper in the Republic of Estonia, published as a weekly broadsheet newspaper in 1991–1995 and four issues as a monthly newsmagazine in 1996. One of the first truly independent (of the Soviet ruling clique influences) newspapers, it was set up in 1991 after a mass exodus of staff from Eesti Ekspress after its Soviet parent company, Cross Development FSP, fired Hans H. Luik.

The newspaper was known for its courageous approach to journalism. For example, it gathered fame through publishing a list of KGB collaborationists in Estonia.
