= Swatantra Tripura Committee =

Coordination of political forces in Tripura, India

The Swatantra Tripura Committee was a coordination of political forces in Tripura, India, that struggled against the integration of Tripura into the state of Assam. The campaign was active 1955-1956.

The committee was founded at meeting in Hotel Tripur, Agartala, 8 October 1955. The organization had 62 members at the time of its foundation. The committee was led by an Executive Committee, Swarnakamal Roy was its president and Dasarath Deb its general secretary.

The Swatantra Tripura Committee had been formed with the backdrop of rumours that the States Reorganisation Commission would propose that Tripura be annexed to the state of Assam. On 10 October 1955, the rumour became an official fact, as the SRC made its recommendations public. The founders of the Swatantra Tripura Committee argued that such a merger would have been ‘undemocratic’ and ‘illogical’. Moreover, the committee argued that Tripura should be an entity of its own within the Indian Union and have its own legislative assembly.

Politically, the committee was backed up by the Communist Party of India, the Revolutionary Socialist Party and the Praja Socialist Party. The Tripura organization of the Indian National Congress had been invited to take part in the founding of the committee, but they stayed aloof.

On 11 October 1955, the committee organized a hartal (general strike) in Agartala. In the evening, a manifestation was held. Nripen Chakroborthy, a speaker at the public meeting, gave a call to build Swatantra Tripura Committee branches throughout Tripura.

On 4 November 1955, the Union Home Minister G .B. Pant visited Agartala. On 5 November 1955 the Swatantra Tripura Committee mobilized a mass protest with some 100,000 participants. Deb and Roy spoke at the rally. During his visit, Pant conveyed that the reorganization issue had not yet been decided and that the Congress party should not be criticized for the recommendations of the SRC.

The Swatantra Tripura Committee organized a conference in Agartala on 6 November 1955, in which representatives from Halam, Kuki, Tripuri, Bengali Hindu and Muslim communities took part. The conference resolved that subdivision-level conferences of the Swatantra Tripura Committee should be held in every subdivision of Tripura within one month.

The issue was settled in July 1956, as the Lok Sabha decided to retain Tripura as a separate entity.
