= Frontul Plugarilor (newspaper) =

- Type: Weekly
- Owner: Ploughmen's Front
- Founded: 1945
- Ceased publication: 1953
- Language: Romanian language
- Headquarters: Bucharest
- OCLC number: 751727730

Frontul Plugarilor ('Ploughmens' Front') was a weekly newspaper published from Bucharest, Romania 1945–1953. It was the organ of the organization with the same name. Frontul Plugarilor was one of several pro-communist publications that began appearing in Romania after the end of the Second World War. Gheorghe Micle and Octav Livezeanu served as the directors of the newspaper. In 1953 the newspaper was superseded by Albina.
