= The Liverpool Herald =

Former Australian newspaper

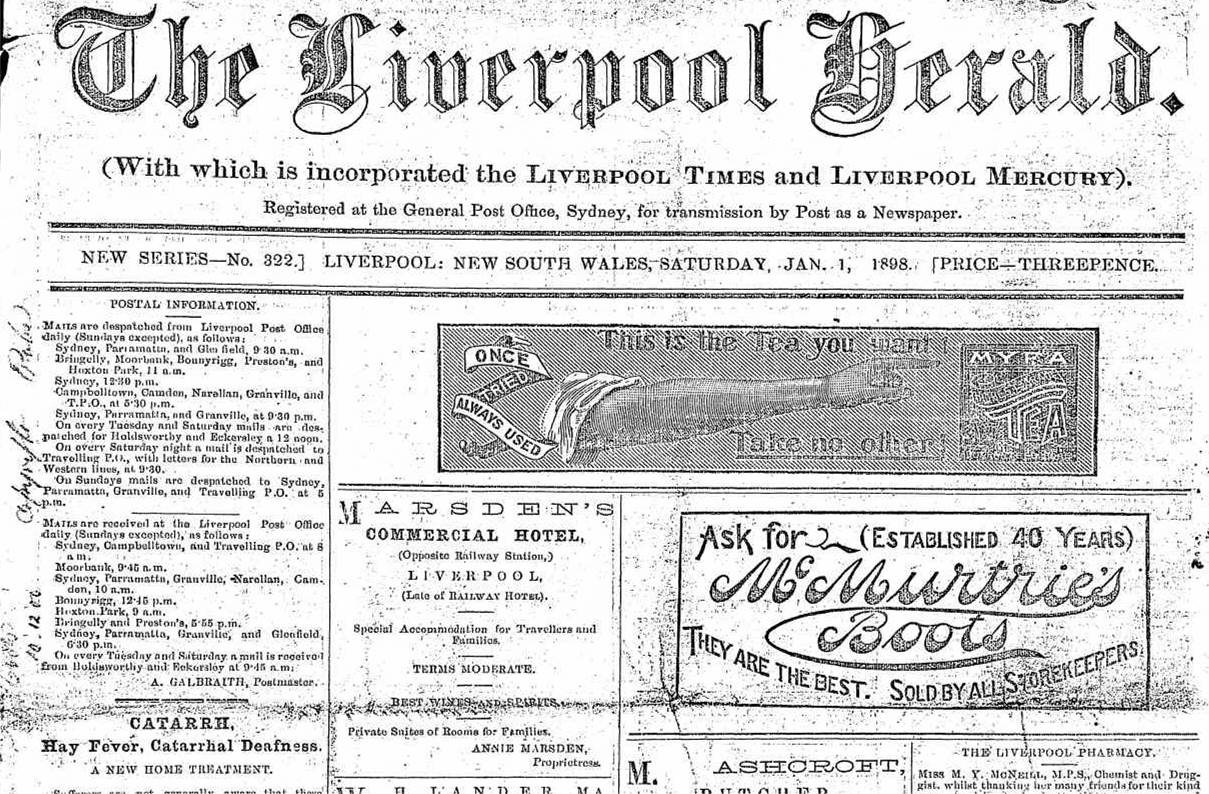
Front page of The Liverpool Herald Newspaper, Saturday 1 January 1898

The Liverpool Herald, earlier published as The Liverpool Mercury and The Liverpool Times, was a weekly English language newspaper published in Liverpool, New South Wales, Australia from 1897 to 1907 and is an important resource to the history of the local area of Liverpool. The issues of the ten-year period covered the daily events of the then country-town Liverpool as well as providing commentaries on events overseas at the time. They also represent the only existing detailed record of any type from that period.

== History ==
The Liverpool Times, printed in Parramatta, was the first local newspaper in Liverpool and soon was made obsolete by The Liverpool Mercury. The Liverpool Herald began in 1897 as a result of the merger of both of these newspapers.

== Pricing ==
The Liverpool Herald cost three pence and came out every Saturday morning.

== Contents ==
The newspaper contained twelve pages of news and advertisements, only two contained coverage of the local news. The rest were devoted to advertisements, comments on overseas news and events, and a short story. The Liverpool Herald documented significant social changes however typical to those occurring in small towns throughout New South Wales at the time.

== Accessibility ==
=== Print ===
Print copies of the newspaper from 1892 to 1912 are available at the State Library of New South Wales.

=== Index ===
The Liverpool Herald Index 1897-1907 produced by the Liverpool City Library in 1985 highlights an extensive array of subject headings from A-Z covered in the newspaper. The cover of the index shows an old image of Macquarie Street, Liverpool and consists of 376 pages. This can be accessed at the Liverpool City Library, NSW

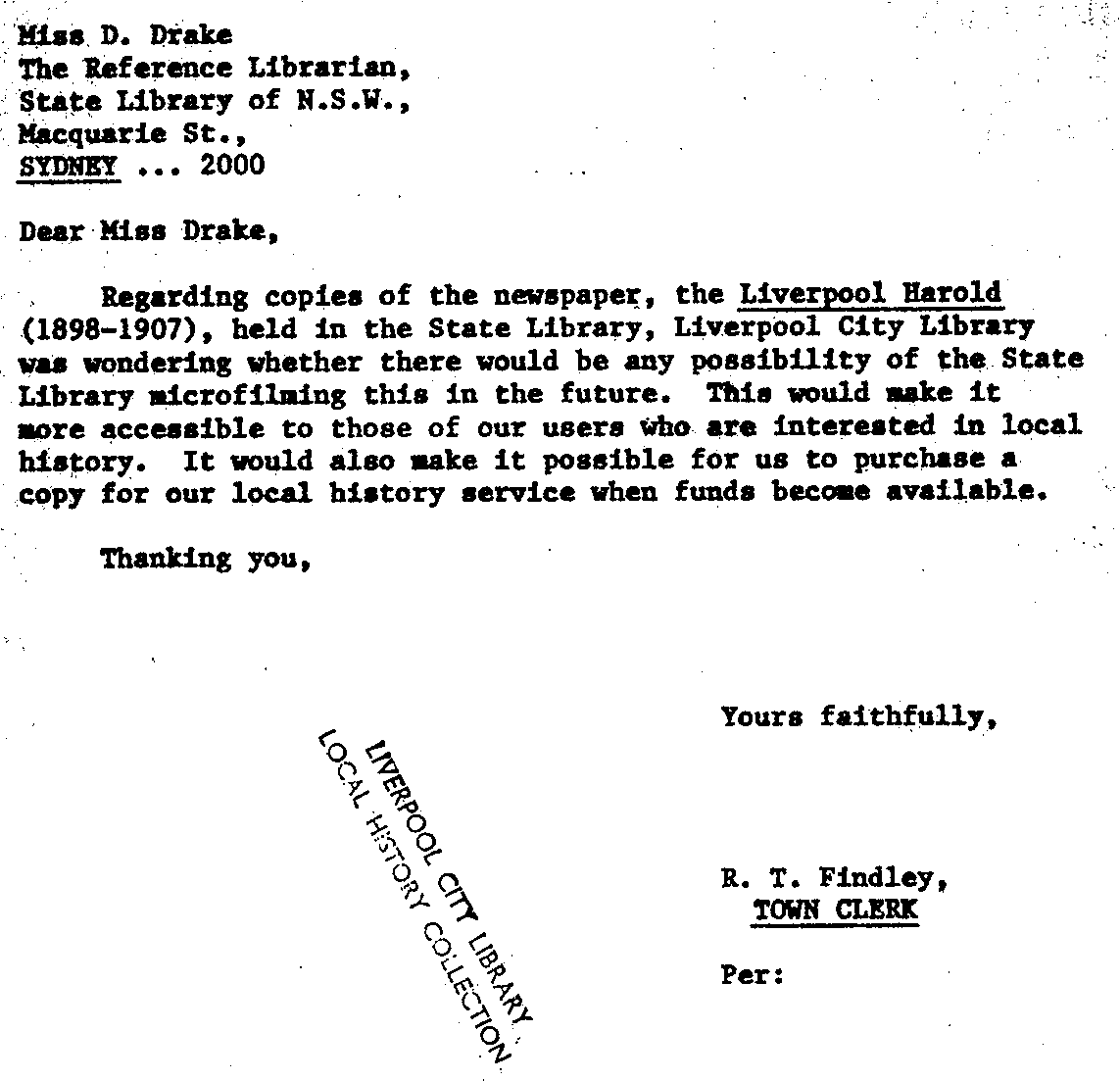
Letter to the State Reference Librarian of NSW in 1979 from Town Clerk R. T. Findley requesting for the newspaper to be microfilmed.

=== Microfilm ===
Town Clerk R. T. Findley wrote a letter in 1979 to Miss Diana Drake, the Reference Librarian at the State Library of NSW at the time requesting for the issues of the newspaper from 1898 to 1907 to be microfilmed. Findley also suggested for a copy to be purchased for the public to access via the local history service. Microfilm copies of the Liverpool Herald are available for access at the Liverpool City Library and at the State Library of NSW.

=== Digitisation ===
The newspaper has been digitised as part of the Australian Newspapers Digitisation Program project of the National Library of Australia. The newspaper's coverage of its local and surrounding areas as well overseas news and events published prior to 1900 is considered to be of the "highest significance". Copies of the newspaper from 1897 to 1907 can now be accessed online through Trove.

== See also ==
- The Liverpool News
- List of newspapers in Australia
