= Laura Perrins =

Co-editor, The Conservative Woman

- Born: Laura McGowan; 1981 (age 44–45); Balbriggan, County Dublin, Ireland
- Education: University College Dublin
- Occupations: Former barrister, writer and co-editor of The Conservative Woman
- Known for: Campaigning for the rights of stay-at-home parents
- Children: 3

Laura Perrins (née McGowan, born 1981) is the Irish co-founder and co-editor of The Conservative Woman. She has written for The Daily Telegraph, the Daily Mail, ConservativeHome and The Catholic Herald. In 2013, she was included in the BBC's 100 Women.

== Education ==
Perrins is originally from Balbriggan, County Dublin, Ireland and studied at University College, Dublin, where she gained her Bachelor of Civil Law (BCL), qualifying as a Barrister-at-Law from the King's Inns in Dublin where was called to the Irish Bar. She went on to qualify as a barrister for England and Wales in 2006, having gained a Master of Laws (LLM) from University of Cambridge.

== Career ==
Perrins gave up work as a barrister to look after her children, and has become an active campaigner for the rights of stay-at-home parents, rising to prominence in 2013 after confronting the then deputy prime minister, Nick Clegg, on this topic during his weekly LBC radio show.

She supported leaving the European Union in the 2016 European Union membership referendum.

Perrins has appeared on Question Time, Any Questions, the Today programme and Woman's Hour, reviews the papers on BBC News, and Sophy Ridge on Sunday and on numerous occasions on Sky News as well as Today with Seán O'Rourke on RTÉ. Perrins has also written for Gript Media.

== Personal life ==
Perrins lives with her husband and three children in East Dulwich, London.
