= Le Réveil du Tadla =

French-language weekly newspaper published in Morocco

- Type: Weekly newspaper
- Editor-in-chief: Gaston Plateau
- Founded: 1929
- Language: French language
- Headquarters: Kasba Tadla

Le Réveil du Tadla ("The Awakening of Tadla") was a French-language weekly newspaper published from Kasba Tadla, Morocco. The newspaper was founded in 1929. Its director was Louis Pouch and its editor-in-chief was Gaston Plateau.
