= The Liverpool News =

Former Australian newspaper

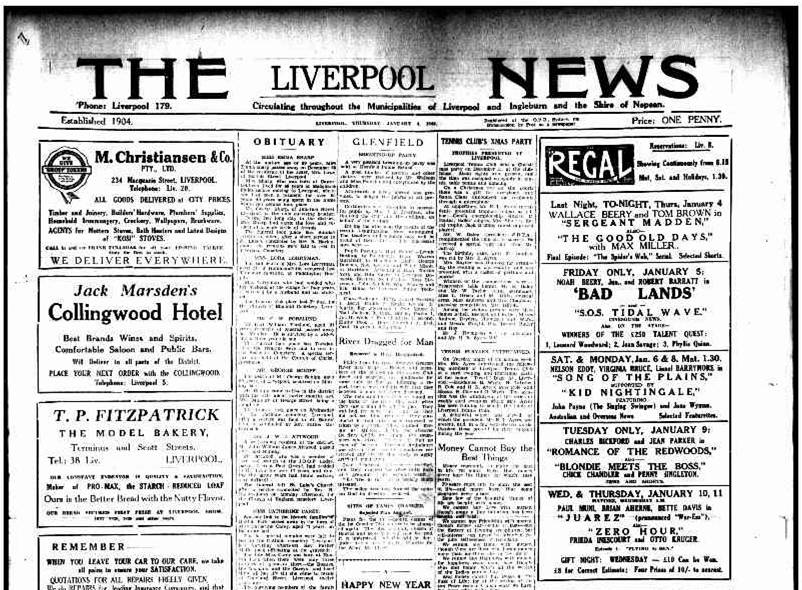
Front page of The Liverpool News, Thursday 15 April 1937

The Liverpool News newspaper was priced at one penny and was one of the earliest newspapers in Liverpool, New South Wales, Australia. The weekly publication was delivered to the shops and houses by Ethbert (Bert) Banyer's son, Brian Banyer. A copy was taken to file at the Liverpool City Council in a folder especially provided as a record of Liverpool's history during those years. Other newspapers also published around this time were The Liverpool Times, The Liverpool Mercury and The Liverpool Herald.

== History ==
According to a 1930 copy of the Liverpool News, which no longer exists, the newspaper stated that it was in its "25th Year of Publication". However, based on the edition dated 15 April 1937, the newspaper was established in 1904 and ended in about 1973, the exact ending year remains unknown. The Liverpool News remained a Banyer family business until about 1937 when it was purchased by The Biz newspaper of Fairfield, owned by the Bright Family. It was eventually absorbed by Cumberland Press, and soon disappeared from circulation.

== Early proprietors ==
In about 1912, Mr. Brown-Parker purchased the newspaper from the previous owner who remains unknown as there is no record of the previous or the original owner of the newspaper.

Alf James then took over The Liverpool News from Brown-Parker. The business was conducted in a building in the grounds of what was later Queen's College in Speed Street, roughly at the near of the Uniting Church, the front of which is in Pirie Street. It is not known when Alf James took over the business. It was not known when Alf James took over the business from Mr. Brown-Parker.

In 1919, ownership of the newspaper was transferred to Benjamin Robinson Banyer who came from South Australia. When Benjamin Robinson Banyer took over the ownership of the newspaper, the printing works was moved to the two-storied premises then existing between Christiansen's Hardware and Building Supplies, and the Commercial Bank of Sydney on the Corner of Scott Street and Macquarie Street. The site is now 242 Macquarie Street, and when last seen in 1982 was Lowes Men's Wear.

Map of the machine room layout

== Printing setup ==
The newspaper was set up and printed in the shed behind a house. It also had the only photographic studio and film developing service in Liverpool. The printing works were located at the back right hand corner of the yard, with the photographic studio behind it. The photographic studio had a stage where Benjamin Robinson Banyer's daughters Joan and Shirley would give concerts occasionally and also had two trapezes set up.

Access to the works was by a pathway on the right hand side (Commercial Bank side) of the house, or vehicle access through a vacant block on the left hand side of the house. This block later had the Monte Carlo Café built on it, run by Con Vallis and Jim Johnson.

The printing machinery consisted of two Platen type presses, used for small printing jobs such as advertising, brochures, public notice, hand-outs etc. The weekly newspaper was printed on a flat bed press, manufactured by Preston Engineering Co. Originally driven from a pulley on a shaft (which drove all the presses), it was later driven by a 2 HP three-phase electric motor. A lot of experimenting was necessary to get the correct pulley size for the motor, as the range of standard size flat pulleys was limited. One size was too small, the next size too large to drive the press at the correct speed. The problem was overcome by using the smaller size pulley and winding some thin rope around it to build it up to the correct size.

== Financial aspects ==
Ethbert Banyer came to Liverpool in 1920 to help his father run The Liverpool News. Benjamin Robinson Banyer employed two casual men as well as Bert who was employed full-time. They had their regular wages each week, while his father and mother would have what was left over after expenses were taken out.

Some shopkeepers could not pay their accounts for advertising in the newspaper so Benjamin and his daughter Joan would go to the advertising shopkeepers on a Friday evening (e.g. grocer, butcher, etc.) and get groceries (or other goods as the case may be) in exchange for what was owed. Some of these accounts would be up around 100 pounds (200 dollars), and the Barter system seemed to work to everyone's satisfaction (up to a point); the shops had to advertise and they had to eat.

Many smaller customers had to have red lines drawn through their account in the book if they were having a hard time. The debt would then be written off, as sometimes there was no hope of recovering these payments during the Depression days.

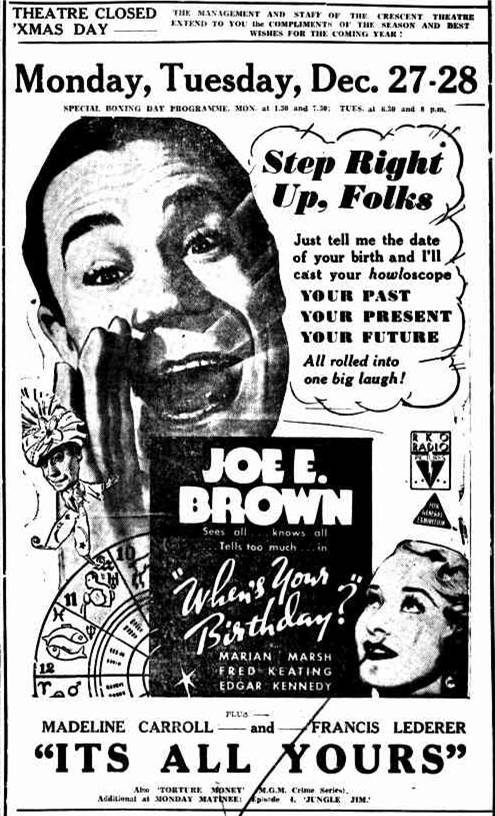
An ad in the newspaper for the movie When's Your Birthday? starring Joe E. Brown and Marian Marsh, 23 December 1937 edition

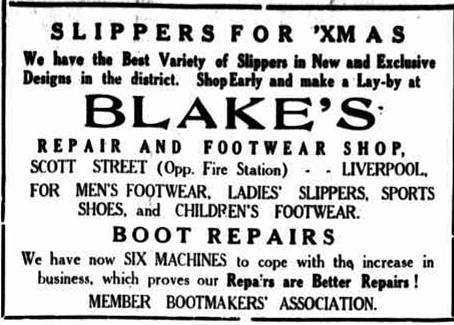
Blake's footwear and repair shop advertisement in the 23 December 1937 edition

== Contents ==
The Liverpool News covered local news and of surrounding areas such as Ingleburn and the Shire of Nepean which is now Penrith City Council. The newspaper also covered events as well as the regular weekly coverage of each Sunday's sermons from local churches. Benjamin Robinson Banyer would bribe his unwilling daughter Joan with a bag of lollies to accompany him to all the local churches to obtain the sermons. Joan would sit quietly at the back row with her lollies while he wrote down the sermons.

Banyer would also attend all of the numerous balls held such as the Ambulance Ball and the Mayoral Ball and publish a full report on who attended, highlights of the night and what the women wore. This was in addition to all the Council meetings that had to be reported in full.

Hi wife had her own column from about 1929 to 1935 under the pen name "Arrow". The column was called "Flights and Darts" that provided coverage of local and overseas current affairs topics.

His son Bert had a regular sports column that included coverage of cricket and tennis news. He would also included reports of the Liverpool Amateur Fishing Club meetings where he was made a Secretary on 9 July 1935 during an inaugural meeting.

== Contests ==
The Liverpool News sponsored one of the earliest retail trade slogan contests in an effort to arrest the drift of shoppers to the rival centre of Parramatta. It was won by Mr. Harold Havelock Chamman with the slogan "Liverpool Trade Means Liverpool Made".

== Accessibility ==
=== Print ===
Unfortunately, early editions of The Liverpool News, 1905 -1937 were destroyed. However original print editions of April 1937 - 1941, 1959, and July 1961 - 1967 survived and are being held in preservation by the State Library of New South Wales, Australia.

=== Microfilm ===
There are currently six reels of microfilms available for public access at Liverpool City Library and the State Library of New South Wales, Australia. The reels contain editions of April 1937 - 1941, 1959, and July 1961 - 1967.

=== Digitisation ===
The Liverpool News was digitised as part of a digitisation initiative Australian Newspapers Digitisation Program. The program was started by the National Library of Australia in 2007 is part of the Australian Newspapers service which allows access to historic Australian newspapers published between 1803 and 1950s. The Liverpool News met the initiative's criteria and was one of the many titles selected nationwide to be digitised. The newspaper's coverage of its local and surrounding areas as well overseas news and events published prior to between 1803 and 1950s is considered to be of state significance. Digital copies of the newspaper from 1937 to 1967 can now be accessed online through Trove.

== See also ==
- The Liverpool Herald
- List of newspapers in Australia
