= North Otago Times =

Newspaper in New Zealand

The North Otago Times was a newspaper published in Oamaru, Otago, New Zealand.

== History ==
The Oamaru Times and Waitaki Reporter was first published on 25 February 1864. It was renamed the North Otago Times in 1870. It ceased publication in 1932.
