= Heriberto Félix Guerra =

Mexican politician (born 1962)

Senator of Mexico
- In office September 1, 2006 – December 14, 2006
- Preceded by: Joaquín Montaño Yamuni

Secretary of Social Development
- In office December 9, 2009 – November 30, 2012
- Preceded by: Ernesto Cordero Arroyo
- Succeeded by: Rosario Robles

Personal details
- Born: Jesús Heriberto Félix Guerra; March 12, 1962 (age 64) Culiacan, Sinaloa, Mexico
- Party: National Action
- Spouse: Lorena Carrillo
- Relations: Married
- Education: ITESM
- Profession: Politician

Jesús Heriberto Félix Guerra (born 12 March 1962) is a Mexican economist and entrepreneur invited to the policy since 2004, a supporter of the National Action Party. He graduated in economics from the Instituto Tecnológico y de Estudios Superiores de Monterrey. He served as Secretary of Social Development of Mexico by appointment of then President Felipe Calderon Hinojosa from December 9, 2009, to November 30, 2012.

== Family life ==
Heriberto Félix was born in Culiacán, Sinaloa. He is married to Lorraine Clouthier Carrillo (daughter of former presidential candidate of the National Action Party, Manuel Clouthier del Rincón "the Maquío"), who has raised a family with six children.

== Business life ==
In 1986 began his business career in which he has had the opportunity to participate in various companies in the sectors of construction, housing and food.

Within business organizations, was President of CANACINTRA in Culiacán, VP CANACINTRA nationally, president of the Economic Development Council of Sinaloa (CODESIN), member of the Presidential Council for Business Competitiveness, the National Board for Micro, Small and Medium Enterprises and the National Interministerial Group for the Promotion of Investment and Foreign Trade. As part of their work in the business, has been lecturer at Harvard University, and at the Organization for Economic Cooperation and Development (OECD) in Milan, Italy. Currently serves on the Council of Businessmen of Sinaloa.

== Organizations Citizen Participation ==
In this field, he has worked for over 15 years as president of the board "Friends of Children", and president of the foundation "Prospera" and "With the Strong Heart". He was also director of citizen IFE in Sinaloa, a member of the "Christian Family Movement" and, together with his wife Lorena Clouthier and other marriages, coordinated the "Engaged Encounter Movement" in Sinaloa for 10 years.

== Political life ==
=== Economic Development Secretary of Sinaloa ===
His first contact with public life by the side of institutions, is when at the request of the private and business organizations, the governor of Sinaloa Siegfried Juan Millán (PRI) invites him in 1999 to serve as Secretary of Economic Development in the state. In its management created the Investment Promotion Unit, System Business Fast Opening (SARE), and Business Management Unit Quick (URGE), schemes that were replicated in other states. Along with state business organizations, created the Sinaloa Fund (FOSIN) to support SMEs, proposed and lobbied Management Act State Enterprise to promote job creation through investment promotion. He was also creator of the "Made in Sinaloa" to position and differentiate the quality of the products of the company at national and international level. Nationally, he was president of the Mexican Association of Secretaries of Economic Development (AMSDE) for 3 consecutive terms. It was there that he sought in Congress to strengthen the SME Fund. He resigned in May 2004 to be invited to seek nomination as a candidate city to Sinaloa state governor by the National Action Party. Heriberto Félix Guerra has been mentioned since 2009 as a character with the potential to compete for the PAN candidacy for the presidency.

=== Participation by the National Action Party ===
After a wave citizen who was a surprise to some leaders of the PAN in Sinaloa, Heriberto Félix Guerra wins the nomination of that political institution as a candidate for governor. The early start to the season surveys estimated a 67% preference for the then ruling Institutional Revolutionary Party (PRI), and only 17% for the PAN. The intense process that enthusiastically joined citizens and business sectors traditionally apathetic to political participation, culminating in their defeat by Jesus Aguilar Padilla (PRI) by 1.2 percentage points, or about 11,300 votes. In 2006 he was nominated by the National Action Party as a candidate for Senator of the Republic, being elected by the principle of first minority.

=== Senator of the Republic ===
On September 1 of 2006 takes oath as Senator of the Republic at the beginning of the first minority by the state of Sinaloa. During his assignment in the Senate, was vice president of 12 legislative committees, noting among other things, the proposed creation of a National Fund for the Prevention of Disasters caused by natural phenomena which would have resources to avoid possible adverse effects of the natural phenomena rather than simply erogarlos in its remediation. In December 2006, calls for popular representation license in order to accept the post of Secretary for Small and Medium Enterprises of the Ministry of Economy, thereby taking the alternate protest Maria Serrano Serrano.

=== Federal Secretary for Small and Medium Enterprises ===
Due to his extensive experience in organizations and business activities, president Felipe Calderon Hinojosa appointed Heriberto Félix Guerra as Undersecretary for Small and Medium Enterprises dependent SE in the Federal Government. In this position, with the support of the various chambers of commerce and employers, was created and promoted the Comprehensive Model Entrepreneurship "Mexico Business" in order to meet new entrepreneurs and Small and Medium Enterprises (MSMEs). This scheme has been regarded as an innovator, and its management is shared with business organizations that have a presence throughout the country, providing them with the necessary tools to support the entrepreneurs independent. This will encourage the participation of citizens and business, avoiding the creation of new structures bureaucratic . He also promoted a network of over 450 incubators for new companies with universities and various business chambers. Centers also created "Mexico Business" in partnership with agencies such as the National Chamber of Commerce (CANACO), the National Chamber of the Transformation Industry (CANACINTRA), the Confederation of the Mexican Republic (COPARMEX), the National Confederation of Industrial Chambers (CONCAMIN), and the Mexican Chamber of Construction Industry (CMIC), among others. Further consolidated Business Accelerator Network in Mexico, United States, Spain and Canada for the care of high-growth enterprises which are called "gazelles" and the National Network of technology parks. Among the highlights of their management programs, are "Mi Tortilla", "My Store" and the "National Franchise "which to date is considered one of the best options for entrepreneurs in Mexico.

=== Secretary of Social Development ===
On December 9 of 2009, he was appointed by President Felipe Calderon Hinojosa Social Development Secretary following the appointment of his predecessor Ernesto Cordero Arroyo in the holder by Ministry of Finance and Public Credit. To fulfill its goals, has involved the civil society so as to meet the objectives faster with the participation of concerned citizens and beneficiaries of such programs and actions. Shows a special interest in programs that seek to engage society to eradicate food poverty in the country. In the care of natural disasters is where else has shown its ability to agree with political actors of different parties, and their ability to organize citizens to finish faster with its affectations. That is why President Calderon has named coordinator of federal actions in contingencies caused by Hurricane Alex (2010), the Hurricane Karl (2010), and the unusual frost in the northwest of the country (2011).

=== Hurricane Alex ===
On the instructions of President Calderon, Heriberto Félix Guerra coordinated the assessment of damage caused by Hurricane Alex, which hit with heavy rains in the states of Coahuila, Nuevo Leon and Tamaulipas (northeastern Mexico) in July 2010. To measure the phenomenon in a comparative way, Hurricane Gilbert struck the region in 1988 resulting in 280mm of water in 24 hours, while Alex generated 446.5mm in the same amount of time. As a first action, "All Mexico with the North" was implemented and made available to the 32 delegations of SEDESOL in the country to collect food from citizens who supported individuals in the north of the country. Moreover, in coordination with the governments of the three states, the damage to public property and affected domestic conditions was assessed to enable the commencement of refund cooperation schemes, highlighting the vouchers for replacing household goods benefiting families who had lost everything because of the floods. After the passage of the meteor, appliances were delivered to 15,847 families.

=== Hurricane Karl ===
Hurricane Karl caused severe floods that hit the state of Veracruz (eastern Mexico). With the participation of the Federal Government, the State Government of Veracruz, the city councils of affected municipalities, civil society and affected, was achieved in a week the dredging and drying 50 billion cubic meters of water (program "Everyone cleans their house") and painted over 30,000 homes in the metropolitan area of Veracruz. This latest action by the conference "Everyone paints his house" sought to break the mark of Guinness Record houses the largest number of people painting their homes simultaneously. The Ministry of Social Development (SEDESOL) just called and provided the necessary equipment to carry out such activity.

=== Frost in the north of the country (2011) ===
In January 2011, the North suffered an unusual drop in temperatures due to intense polar fronts that damaged thousands of hectares of crops in the states of Sonora, Sinaloa, Chihuahua and Durango. Temperatures generated such anomalies were the lowest recorded in the last 20 years. The situation was serious because the states of Sonora and Sinaloa received damage themselves jeopardized the supply of corn in the rest of the country, and therefore the price. That is why it was considered a great success reseeding of about 300 thousand hectares of corn and a hundred thousand of sorghum in those states, both measurable success by the number of hectares of crops and restored by the time that the problem was solved (only one month). The contingency was resolved overcome not only ensuring supply and price of these inputs, but providing jobs through Temporary Employment Program Emerging more than 100,000 laborers both the affected states like Oaxaca, Hidalgo, San Luis Potosi, Veracruz, and other parts of the country.

== Awards and recognition ==
- National Franchise Award "Juan Huerdo", the highest honor of the Mexican Franchise Association (MFA), filed on March 24 of 2008 to the Ministry of Economy for the promotion of the SMEs .
- Award "Aguila CANACINTRA "delivered October 29, 2010, by the National Chamber of the Transformation Industry by boosting programs that strengthen the economy of families, and strengthening of small and medium enterprises through the program "Mexico Business".
- Medal " Veracruz "Citizen Merit awarded by the Veracruz state government to those whose work is relevant and has reported a profit for the state, was given to Félix Guerra on November 22, 2010, by the success of actions to address the contingencies caused by Hurricane Karl.
