= Swatantra Nepali =

- Publisher: Thakur Chandan Singh
- Founded: August 21, 1954
- Ceased publication: August 30, 1955
- Language: Nepali language
- Headquarters: Dehra Dun

Swatantra Nepali (Nepali: स्वतंत्र नेपाली, 'Free Nepali') was a Nepali language weekly newspaper published from Dehra Dun, India. The newspaper covered political issues of Nepal, and voiced opposition against Rana rule in the country. The first issue of Swatantra Nepali was published on August 21, 1954. The newspaper was published by Thakur Chandan Singh (that had run different magazines in the past, but left publishing in 1933). Thakur Pratap Singh, former Home and Development Minister of Bikaner State and a member of the Bikaner royal family, contributed to the finances of the newspaper.

The issues of Swatantra Nepali covered 8–12 pages each, and were sold at the price of one anna. It was printed at Yugabani Press.

The last issue of Swatantra Nepali was published on August 30, 1955. Publication was discontinued due to lack of funds. All in all, 46 issues of the newspaper had been printed.
