= Oran socialiste =

Left-wing Algerian newspaper

Oran socialiste was a weekly newspaper published from Oran, Algeria, 1928–1939. Oran socialiste was the organ of the French Section of the Workers' International (S.F.I.O.) in Oran. Oran socialiste was founded and edited by Marius Dubois.
