= Media preservation =

Preservation of media

Preservation of documents, pictures, recordings, video games, etc. digital content, is a major aspect of archival science. It is also an important consideration for people who are creating time capsules, family history, historical documents, scrapbooks and family trees. Common storage media are not permanent, and there are few reliable methods of preserving documents and pictures for the future.

== Paper/prints (photos) ==
Color negatives and ordinary color prints may fade away to nothing in a relatively short period if not stored and handled properly. This happens even if the negatives and prints are kept in the dark, because ambient light is not the determining factor, but heat and humidity are. The color degradation is the result of the dyes used in the color processes. Because color processing results in a less stable image than traditional black-and-white processing, black-and-white pictures from the 1920s are more likely to survive long-term than color films and photographs from after the middle of the 20th century.

Black-and-white photographic films using silver halide emulsions are the only film types that have proven to last for archival storage. The determining factors for longevity include the film base type, proper processing (develop, stop, fix, and wash), and proper storage. Early films used a Cellulose nitrate base which was prone to decomposition and highly flammable. Nitrate film was replaced with acetate-base films. These Cellulose acetate films were later discovered to outgas acids (also referred to as "vinegar syndrome"). Acetate films were replaced in the early 1980s by polyester film base materials, which have been determined to be more stable than film stocks with a nitrate or acetate base.

Color prints made on most inkjet printers have a very short lifespan, measured in months rather than in years. Even prints from commercial photo labs will start to fade in a matter of years if not processed properly and stored in cool, dry environments.

== Documents/books ==
With documents for which the media are not so critical as what the documents contain, the information in documents can be copied by using photocopiers and image scanners. Books and manuscripts can also have their information saved without destruction by using a book scanner.

Where the medium itself needs to be preserved, for example, if a document is a crayon sketch by a famous artist on paper, a complex process of preservation may be used. Depending on the condition and importance of the item, this can include gluing the media onto more stable media or protective enclosing of the media. Polyester sleeves, acid-free folders, and pH-buffered document boxes are common supportive protective enclosures whose selection must match the media's chemical and physical properties. Other considerations in preserving paper/books are

- Damaging light, particularly UV light, which fades and destroys media over time by breaking down the molecules.
- Atmosphere contains small traces of sulfur dioxide and nitric acid which turn media yellow and break the fibers down.
- Humidity and moisture also aid in the breakdown of media. If there is too much, the document can be attacked by bacteria, and if too little, the cellulose material breaks down.
- Temperature, particularly elevated ones, can destroy some media. Low temperatures can cause the water to form crystals, which expands, destroying the structure of paper-based documents.

== Online photo albums ==
Although there are many websites that allow the upload of photographs and videos, digital preservation for the long-term is still considered an issue. There is a lack of confidence that such websites are capable of storing data for long periods of time (ex. 50 years) without data degradation or loss.

== Optical media – CD, DVD, Blu-ray, M-Disc ==
Write-once optical media, such as CD-Rs and DVD-Rs, typically contain an organic dye that distinguishes data reading from data writing based on the dye's transparency along the disc. Conventional CDs and DVDs have finite shelf-life due to natural degradation of the dye; the newer M-DISC uses inorganic material technology to produce molded DVDs and Blu-Rays (up to 3-layer 100GB BDXL) with a claimed lifespan of 100–1000 years if stored correctly with most BD & BDXL rated read/writers enabling the higher power mode for the M-Disc format after 2011. The National Archives and Records Administration lists published life expectancies to be 10 or 25 years or more for normal CDs and DVDs and conservative life expectancies to be between 2 and 5 years. Storage environments, such as temperature and humidity, as well as handling conditions such as frequency of media use and compatibility between the recorder and media, affect media shelf-life. Improvements in media storage and migrations to new recording technologies can make certain formats obsolete within their respective lifespan. Technologists have pointed to internet streaming services, where services such as video-on-demand have contributed to the 33 percent decline in DVD sales the past 5 years, as a challenge for digital preservation.

== Magnetic media – video cassettes, tapes, hard drives ==
Magnetic media such as audio and video tape and floppy disks also have limited life spans.

Audio and videotapes require specific care and handling to ensure that the recorded information will be preserved. For information that must be preserved indefinitely, periodic transcription from old media to new ones is necessary, not only because the media are unstable but also because the recording technology may become obsolete.

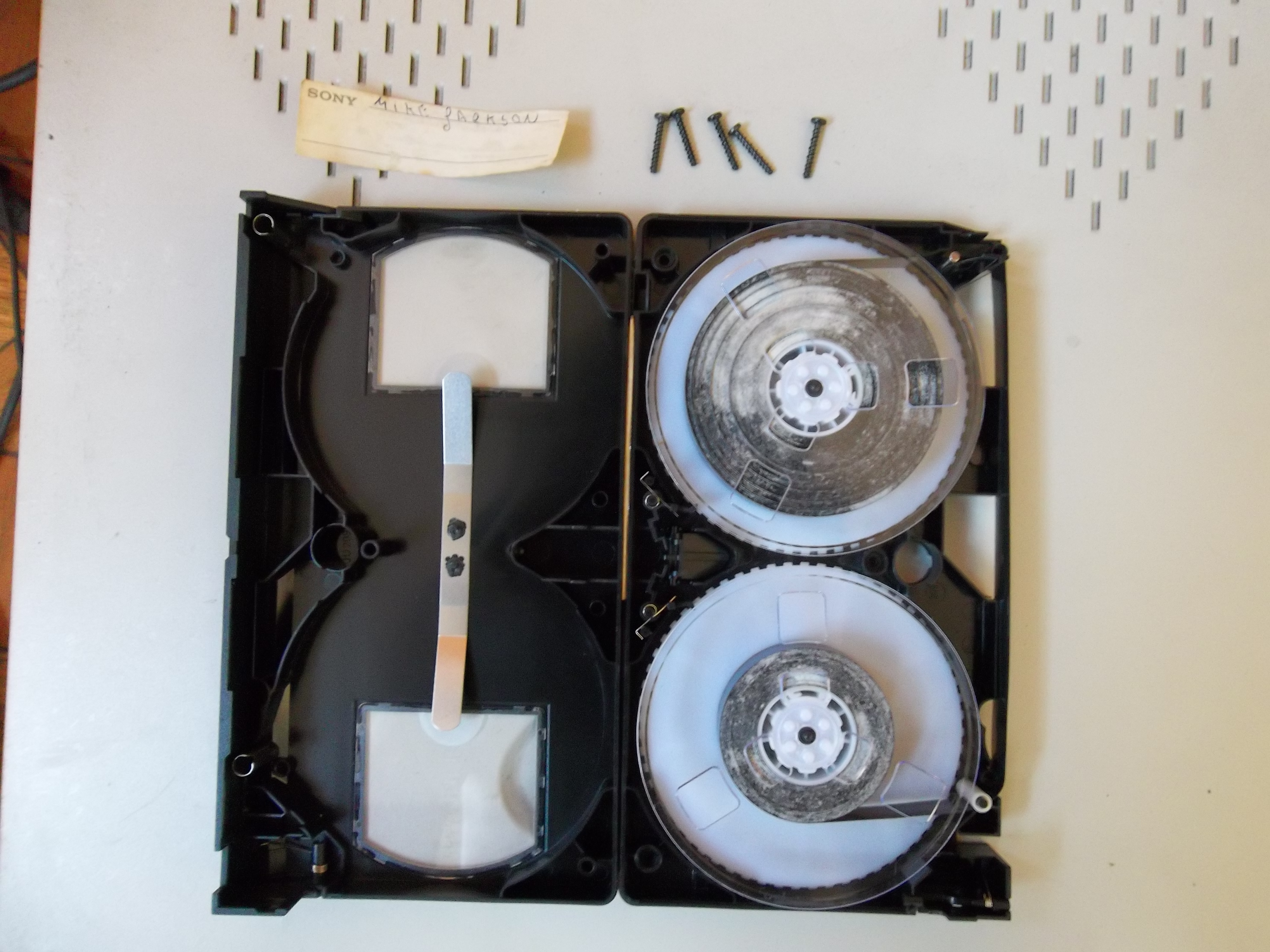
A badly molded VHS tape. Mold can grow due to humidity on the storage space, and then prevent modern usage.

Magnetic media also deteriorates naturally with typical shelf lives between 10 and 20 years. Magnetic tape can degrade from binder hydrolysis or magnetic remanence decay. Binder hydrolysis, also known as sticky-shed syndrome, refers to the breakdown of binder, or glue, that holds the magnetic particles to the polyester base of the tape. Tapes which have been stored in hot, humid conditions are particularly vulnerable to this phenomenon and may suffer from accelerated degradation. A severe binder can cause the magnetic material to fall off or shed from the base, leaving a pile of dust and clear backing. Archivists can bake the tape, which evaporates water molecules on the tape, to temporarily restore the binder before making a copy.

Magnetic tape can also be destabilized by magnetic remanence decay, which refers to the weakening of the tape's magnetization over time. This weakens the affected tape's readability, leading to reduced sound clarity and volume or picture hue and contrast. Baking the tape will not restore magnetization.

Media at risk include recorded media such as master audio recordings of symphonies and videotape recordings of the news gathered over the last 40 years. Threats to media that must be considered when archiving important record media include accidental erasure, physical loss due to disasters such as fires and floods, and media degradation.

Along with the actual media being degraded over the years, the machines that are available to play back or reproduce the audio sources are becoming archaic themselves. Manufacturers and their support (parts, technical updates) for their machines have disappeared throughout the years. Even if the medium is vaulted and archived correctly, the mechanical properties of the machines have deteriorated to the point that they could do more harm than good to the tape being played.

Many major film studios are now backing up their libraries by converting them to electronic media files, such as .AIFF or .WAV-based files via digital audio workstations. That way, even if the digital platform manufacturer goes out of business or no longer supports their product, the files can still be played on any common computer.

There is a detailed process that must take place previous to the final archival product now that a digital solution is in place. Sample rates and their conversion and reference speed are both critical in this process.

In floppy disks, the lubricants inside the plastic jackets of many older floppies promote the decay of the magnetic medium. Also, the alignment of the magnetic particles of the disk substrate may gradually degrade, leading to a loss of formatting and data. Early laser disk media were prone to degradation as the layers of the disk substrate were bonded with an adhesive that was vulnerable to decay and would crumble over time. This would lead the different layers of the disk to peel apart, damaging the pitted data surface and rendering the disk unreadable.

== See also ==
- Digital preservation – Practice to keep digital assets accessible in long term
- Media Preservation Foundation – US archive of radio station jingles
- Preservation (library and archival science) – Set of activities aimed at prolonging the life of a record or object
- Preservation of magnetic audiotape
- List of national archives
- Smithsonian Institution – US group of museums and research centers
- National Audio-Visual Conservation Center – US Library of Congress audiovisual archive
- Library of Congress – US Congress research library
- Academy Film Archive – Part of the Academy Foundation
- National Archives and Records Administration – United States government agency
- Packard Humanities Institute – American non-profit foundation
- George Eastman Museum – Museum in Rochester, New York
- George Eastman House Motion Picture Collection – Museum in Rochester, New York, United States
- Museum of the Moving Image (New York City) – Museum and archive in Queens, New York
- National Film Board of Canada – Public film and digital media producer and distributor
- Separation masters – Long-term preservation for modern color motion picture film
- Film preservation – Historic preservation of motion pictures
- Photograph preservation – Study of the physical care and treatment of photographic materials
