= Mold control and prevention (library and archive) =

Conservation activity

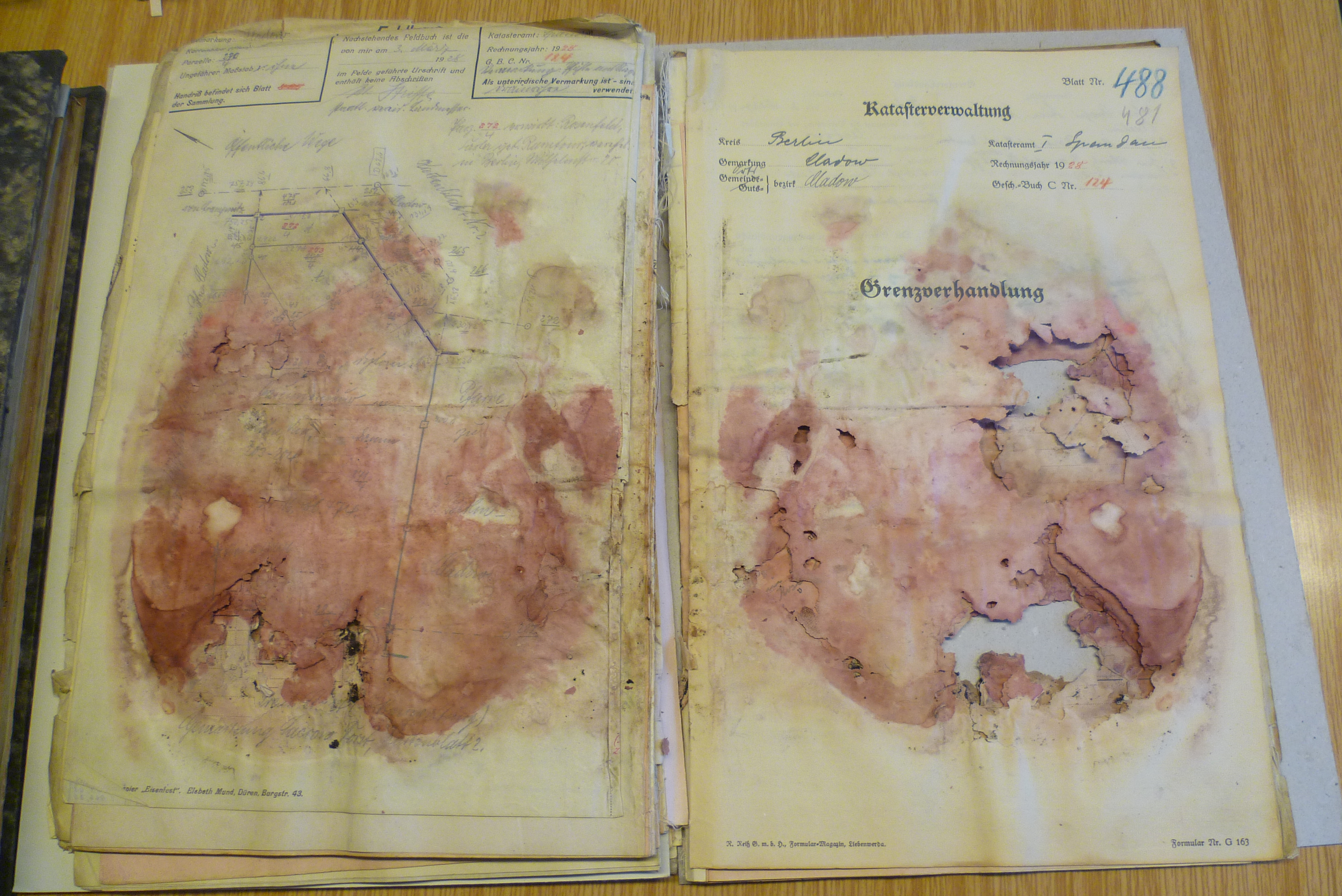
An example of mold damage

Mold control and prevention is a conservation activity that is performed in libraries and archives to protect books, documents and other materials from deterioration caused by mold growth. Mold prevention consists of different methods, such as chemical treatments, careful environmental control, and manual cleaning. Preservationists use one or a combination of these methods to combat mold spores in library and archival collections.

Due to the resilient nature of mold and its potential for damage to library collections, mold prevention has become an important activity among preservation librarians. Although mold is naturally present in both indoor and outdoor environments, under the right circumstances it can become active after being in a dormant state. Mold growth responds to increased moisture, high humidity, and warm temperatures. Library collections are particularly vulnerable to mold since mold thrives off of organic, cellulose-based materials such as paper, wood, and textiles made of natural fibers. Changes in the moisture in the atmosphere can lead to mold growth and irreparable damage to library collections.

== Mold ==
Mold is a generic term for a specific type of fungi. Mildew may also refer to types of mold. Since there are so many species of mold, their appearance varies in color and growth habit. In general, active mold has a musty odor and appears fuzzy, slimy, or damp. Inactive mold looks dry and powdery.

Mold propagates via spores, which are always present in the environment. Mold spores can be transferred to an object by mechanical instruments or air circulation. When spores attach to another organism, and the environment is favorable, they begin to germinate. Mold produce mycelium which growth pattern resembles cobwebs. Mycelium allows the mold to obtain food and nutrients through the host. Inevitably, the mycelium produces spore sacs and release new spores into the air. Eventually the spores land on new material, and the reproductive cycle begins again.

Identifying mold can be a challenge, because some species resemble dust, dirt, or spiderwebs. In addition, staining caused by mold can be confused with water damage. Ultraviolet light and magnification are two tools to aid in identifying mold on library collections.

Poor air circulation, moisture, high temperatures, and environmental humidity are the main causes of mold outbreaks in library collections. When the temperature is above 70 °F (21 °C) and the relative humidity is above 55 percent, mold begins to develop. Collections kept in basements or environments with uncontrolled temperature and humidity are most likely to be impacted by a mold outbreak.

Mold is a dangerous library pest because of the damage it causes to the collections. Mold thrives off of paper and books; these objects provide the fungi a source of nutrition, namely the sugar and starches present in the cellulose materials. Mold feeds on cloth, leather, glues, adhesives, cellulose starch and starches in the sizing. Frequently, mold is noticed on the bindings long before it begins on the text blocks. By feeding on books, mold can cause the paper to become thin, soft, or spongy. Images and decorative elements can be completely destroyed or, at the very least, become stained.

== Impact on materials ==
When a book or paper becomes moldy, the fungi will digest its food source, paper and cloth (such as book covers and bindings) in order to survive. This process stains and destroys books, papers, and other library collections over time. During their growth mold and mildew produce citric, gluconic, oxalic, or other organic acids that can damage paper, leather, cloth, etc. They also at times produce color bodies, leading to staining which is difficult to remove. Mold will continually grow until it uses up its food source, which means a library collection could be totally consumed. Unless every mold spore is treated, the issue will just return. Mold's enduring nature makes treatment difficult and prevention all the more necessary.

== Prevention ==
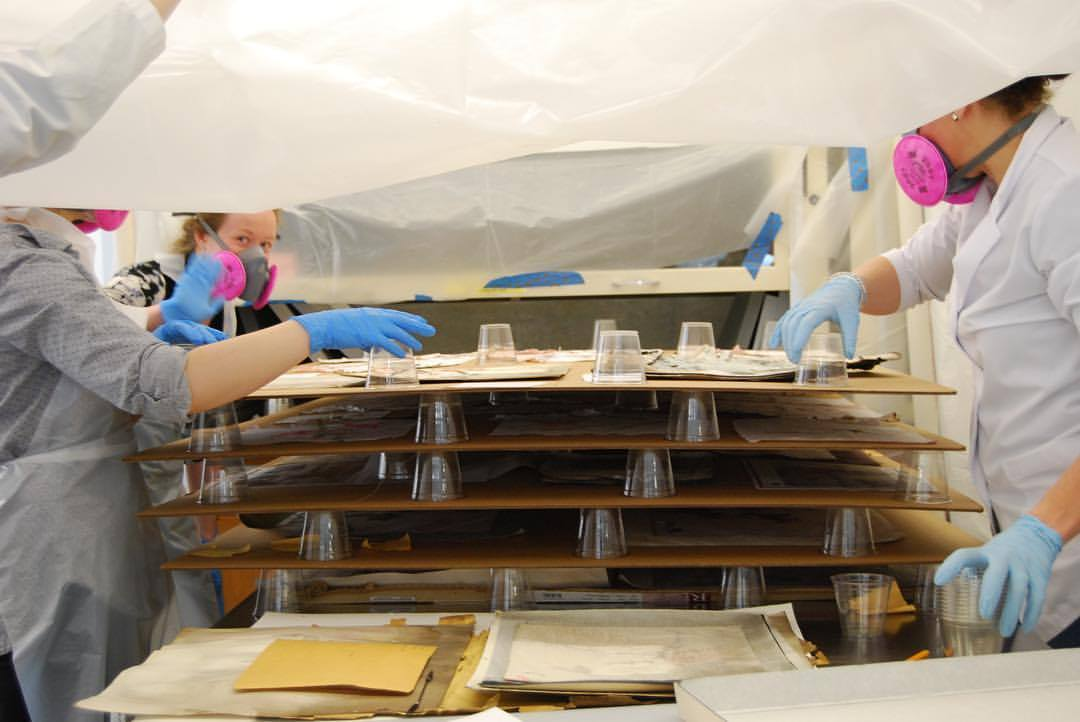
Conservation staff drying mold-damaged materials

The only way to control mold is by altering conditions conducive to its growth. The generally accepted threshold for mold growth is about 15% moisture content because the predominant cause of mold is excess water. Excess water can come from liquid water, as a result of leaks, or water vapor, as a result of high relative humidity due to improper storage, faulty humidifiers, or HVAC malfunctions. While most research shows that fungal growth is most prevalent in conditions in which relative humidity is above 60%, humidity levels below this threshold alone will not prevent mold growth, given the fact that favorable germination environments vary from species to species.

=== Environmental controls ===
Many libraries monitor a building's atmosphere through the use of HVAC systems. These built-in ventilation systems help to combat mold growth that occurs as a result of relative humidity levels greater than 65% and temperature greater than 70 °F (21 °C), as well poor air circulation. Proper use and monitoring of HVAC systems can help to prevent mold problems before they occur. Air ventilation removes existing mold spores from the air and keeps the atmosphere relatively dry and cool. Effective HVAC systems have a good system design and the ability to provide environmental control over entire building areas. Proper maintenance of equipment also lowers the chances that issues will arise due to system outages . At 70 °F (21 °C) and 50% relative humidity, the equilibrium moisture content of the environment would be 9.2%, low enough to prevent mold growth. However, proper air flow and air exchange is required to effectively disrupt the boundary layers of air around room contents, which can have high water vapor levels within the surrounding dry air and promote mold amplification.

=== Manual solutions ===
Manual methods such as HEPA filtered vacuuming serves as a backup to eliminating mold via environmental control. HEPA vacuums possess air filters that do not allow mold to be spread into the air again. Installing drying fans, wiping dry books and surrounding furniture, as well as air ducts and shelves will also help to prevent further infestations. In extreme cases, some books and items are discarded to protect the rest of the collection from being affected. These preservation activities are provided by available library staff or hired contractors.

=== Storage ===
Proper storage practices can be effective in preventing mold growth. Storing materials away from exterior walls and damp areas like basements can reduce the risk of mold growth. In addition, the use of desiccants can control humidity inside enclosed containers.

== Safe handling ==
Proper handling of affected or damaged materials prevents mold from spreading. Because mold spores are released into the air, it is recommended to wear an NIOSH-rated respirator before coming into contact with affected materials. Nitrile gloves should be worn to protect the skin from contact with mold. In extreme cases, a full-body hazmat suit may be required. Materials must always be treated on a surface that can be cleaned with bleach or on neutral, disposable materials such as unprinted newsprint.

=== Potential health concerns ===
Mold is harmful to materials, and may cause mold health issues in humans. When a library collection experiences a mold outbreak, actions need to be taken to ensure preservation of materials and the good health of the people involved. Mold is more hazardous to those who have allergies or suffer from respiratory problems such as asthma. Some mold species can irritate other parts of the body through prolonged exposure. In some cases, protective clothing is necessary when handling mold found on library collections.

== Monitoring ==
Mold spores are always present in the environment and when conditions are favorable, mold will occur. Regular monitoring of the collection through visual inspection and environmental controls is essential to prevent an outbreak.

Mold leaves a visual indication of its presence. Though mold can be any color, gray and black spots coupled with a musty odor can indicate the presence of mold. Books with these indicators can be isolated and treatment steps can be implemented. Books in the surrounding area can be monitored in case of further infestation. Presence of water or condensation and dust are other factors to look out for that can encourage mold growth. Regular cleaning and inspections will help monitor for mold growth.

The control and regular monitoring of temperature and humidity levels is vital to prevent mold growth. Guidelines suggest that temperatures be maintained between 65–70 °F (18–21 °C) and relative humidity between 45%-65%. HVAC systems can be utilized and monitored to ensure these levels are maintained. Temperature and humidity values can be systematically measured and recorded to document conditions, to alert of severe fluctuations, and to indicate the functionality of the climate control systems. The systems themselves should be regularly checked for accuracy and functionality.

== Treatments for mold damage ==
=== Chemical treatments ===
Preservation librarians use a number of different chemicals to prevent the growth of mold spores. Chemical compounds such as ethylene oxide, thymol, and orthophenyl phenol are regularly used.

Chlorine dioxide is a chemical that started growing in popularity in the early 2000's due its safety level for library employees and patrons. These chemicals act as effective sporicides in a variety of library settings. They are applied on books and surrounding shelves by manual wiping or using chlorine packets that release the chemicals in gaseous form into the air.

Chemical treatments are often used in enclosed storage areas with little air circulation. They are also used to deal with emergency situations involving mold outbreaks caused by pipe leaks in buildings. In 2000, the University of Oklahoma Libraries conducted an evaluation of the effects of chlorine packets on mold growth. Paper items that had been exposed to the substance showed lower overall pH levels than items that had not been treated. Although long-term effects of chemical treatments on paper permanence and other library materials have not been documented, libraries use this newer method of controlling mold in the stacks.

=== Freeze drying and UV light ===
Freeze drying or ultraviolet light exposure are other ways to inhibit mold growth, although they do not kill mold spores permanently. Eliminating mold through these methods is challenging due to paper degradation caused by light exposure over time. There are also some mold species that have preferences for colder temperatures. Freezing and UV exposure are used as a temporary means to stop mold from spreading throughout library collections.

== See also ==
- Mold growth, assessment, and remediation
- Preservation (library and archival science)
