= South Texas Historical Association =

The South Texas Historical Association is a regional organization dedicated to the preservation of the history of South Texas. It was founded in 1954 "to encourage the organization and to aid in the development of local historical societies and to discover, collect, preserve, and publish historical records and data relating to South Texas, and with special emphasis on the Tamaulipan background and the colony of Nuevo Santander." The Journal of South Texas is a biannual publication and is sent to all members of the South Texas Historical Association.
