= Paul Banks and Carolyn Harris Preservation Award =

Annual award for library preservation professionals

- Awarded for: Excellence in the preservation and/or conservation of library and archival materials
- Presented by: Association for Library Collections and Technical Services (ALCTS), American Library Association
- First award: 2001
- Final award: 2020
- Website: ptlp.com/en/ptlp/overview/banks-harris-award/recipients/

The Paul Banks and Carolyn Harris Preservation Award (known informally as the Banks/Harris award), was awarded annually by the Association for Library Collections and Technical Services (ALCTS), a division of the American Library Association, from 2001 to 2020. The award was established to honor the memory of Paul N. Banks and Carolyn Harris, two early leaders in library preservation.

The award consisted of a citation and a $1,500 grant donated by Preservation Technologies, L.P. The award recognized the contribution of a professional preservation specialist who has been active in the field of preservation or conservation for library or archival materials. Winners were chosen based on their accomplishments in preservation leadership, including activities such as leadership in professional associations, training and mentoring in the preservation field, development of new methods and techniques, and significant contributions to literature.

== Recipients ==
Year	Winner	Role
2001	Sally Buchanan	Associate professor at the University of Pittsburgh School of Information Sciences
2002	Ellen McCrady (d. 2008)	Editor and publisher of the Abbey Newsletter (Note: Abbey Newsletter) for preservation professionals from 1975 to 2004 and the Alkaline Paper Advocate (Note: Alkaline Paper Advocate) from 1988 to 2008. She also conducted research regarding papermaking and acid testing.
2003	John F. Dean	Head of the Department of Preservation and Conservation at Cornell University Library since its beginning in 1985
2004	Janice Merrill-Oldham	Malloy-Rabinowitz Preservation Librarian at Harvard Library, overseeing the Weissman Preservation Center and the Preservation and Imaging Department
2005	Paul Conway	Professor in the University of Michigan School of Information whose work focuses on digital preservation and electronic media
2006	Gary Frost	Conservator at the University of Iowa Libraries and leader in the field of library preservation for over 35 years
2007	Walter Henry	Conservator at the Stanford University Libraries and Academic Information Resources and creator of Conservation OnLine and the Conservation DistList
2008	Janet Gertz	Director for Preservation at Columbia University Libraries and former chair of ALCTS' Preservation and Reformatting Section (PARS)
2009	Barclay W. Ogden	Head of the Preservation Department at the University of California, Berkeley Libraries and leader in disaster planning
2010	Michèle V. Cloonan	Dean and professor of the Graduate School of Library and Information Science, Simmons College
2011	Roberta Pilette	Director of the Preservation Department and Chief Preservation Officer for the Yale University Library
2012	Julie Allen Page	Co-coordinator of the California Preservation Program (CPP) (Note: California Preservation Program (CPP)) and the Western States & Territories Preservation Assistance Service (WESTPAS). (Note: Western States & Territories Preservation Assistance Service (WESTPAS))
2013	Randy Silverman	Preservation Librarian, University of Utah Library
2014	James M. Reilly	Director, Image Permanence Institute
2015	Jeanne Drewes	Chief of Binding and Collections Care Division, Library of Congress
2016	Ellen Cunningham-Kruppa	Associate Director and Head of the Preservation and Conservation Division at the Harry Ransom Center, UT Austin
2017	Karen Kiorpes	Preservation Librarian for the University at Albany, SUNY, University Libraries
2018	Nancy E. Kraft	Head of the Preservation Department at the University of Iowa Libraries
2019	Paula De Stefano	Barbara Goldsmith Curator for Preservation and Head of the Preservation Department at New York University Libraries
2020	Jennifer Hain Teper	University of Illinois Urbana-Champaign
2021	no award	

== See also ==
- List of American Library Association awards
