= Tenite =

Brand of plastic

Tenite is a brand of cellulosic thermoplastic materials produced by the Eastman Chemical Company. Created in 1929, and trademarked in 1932, Tenite continues to be used in a wide variety of consumer, industrial, architectural and medical applications. Tenite cellulosics are manufactured from renewable raw materials (soft woods); they exhibit many of the same tactile and finish properties as wood, yet can easily be molded and extruded. Historically, applications for Tenite have varied from radios and telephones, to toys, toothbrushes and eyeglass frames.

Tenite is not a durable plastic. Objects manufactured from Tenite slowly deform and warp over decades, eventually becoming unusable. Some formulations of Tenite are susceptible to surface mold.. One form of Tenite degradation is a white scale or bloom.

== History ==
In 1920, George Eastman established the site that would later become the headquarters for Eastman Chemical to provide a reliable domestic supply of compounds for Kodak's photographic processes. With the company's knowledge of acetyl chemistry for film production, Tennessee Eastman developed compounded cellulose acetate in 1929, which was sold under the Tenite cellulosics trade mark. Over the next few decades new versions of Tenite were developed from mixed esters to meet a wider range of market requirements, with the most advanced remaining in production in 2025.

== Production ==
Tenite cellulosics are polymers of cellulose esters. Various formulations were referred to as Tenite Acetate, Tenite Butyrate, and Tenite Propionate. The mechanical, thermal, electrical, and optical properties were modified by the addition of plasticisers. Dyes and pigments are added for coloring, controlling translucency, and inhibiting the degrading effect of ultraviolet light. The material is processed into pellets for distribution. Downstream manufacturers mold or extrude the pellets into applications from eyeglass frames, tool handles and gun stocks to playing cards and casino dice.

Prior to World War II, Tenite was used by most American automakers to fashion steering wheels, dashboards, knobs, and handles. During the war, Tenite was used to manufacture a wide range of military equipment, including weaponry, medical devices, musical instruments, indicator lights, and other uses.

== Decay and preservation issues ==
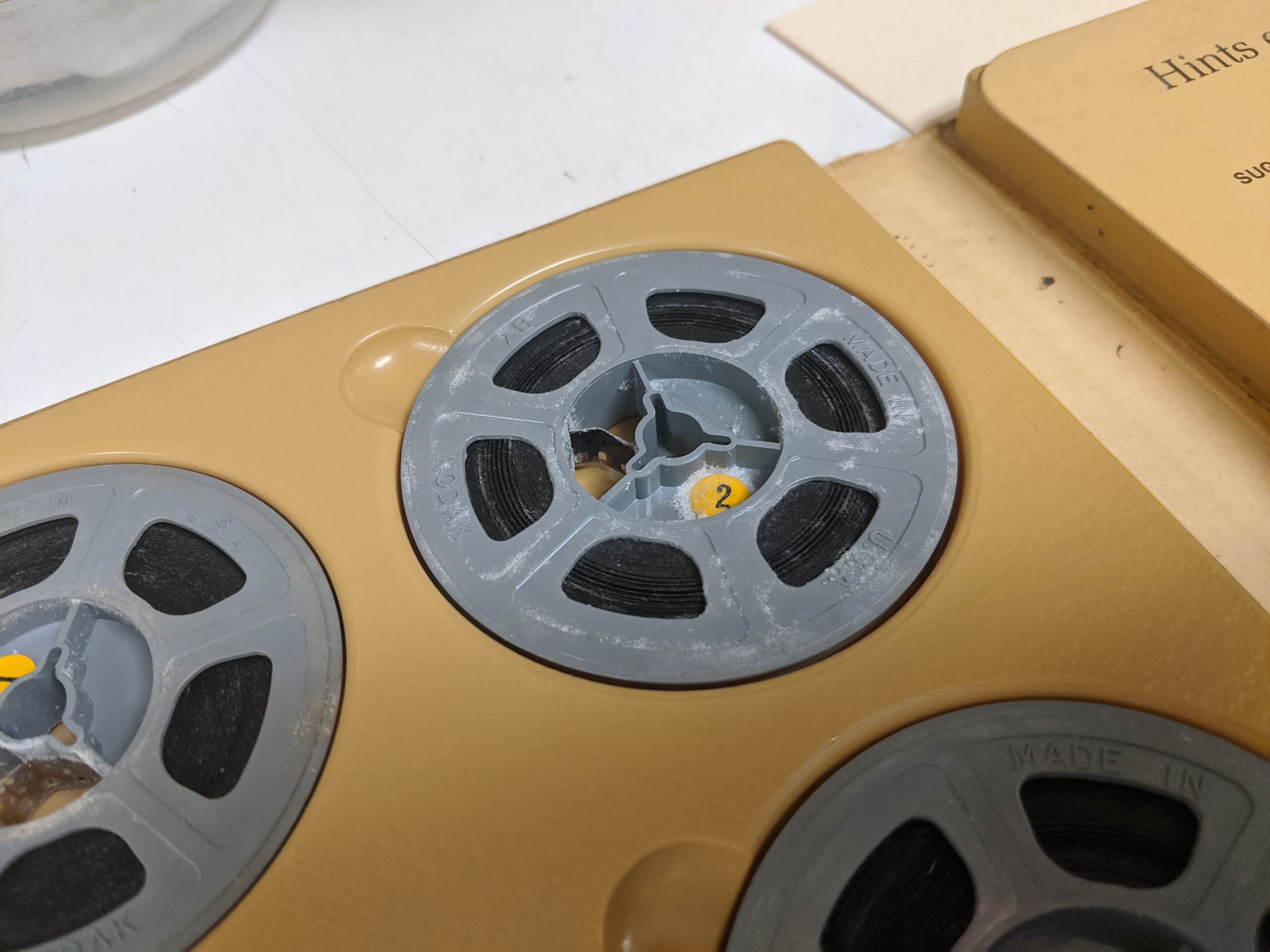
8mm Kodak home movie reel from the 1960s showing signs of Tenite decay (as a white powdery exudate).

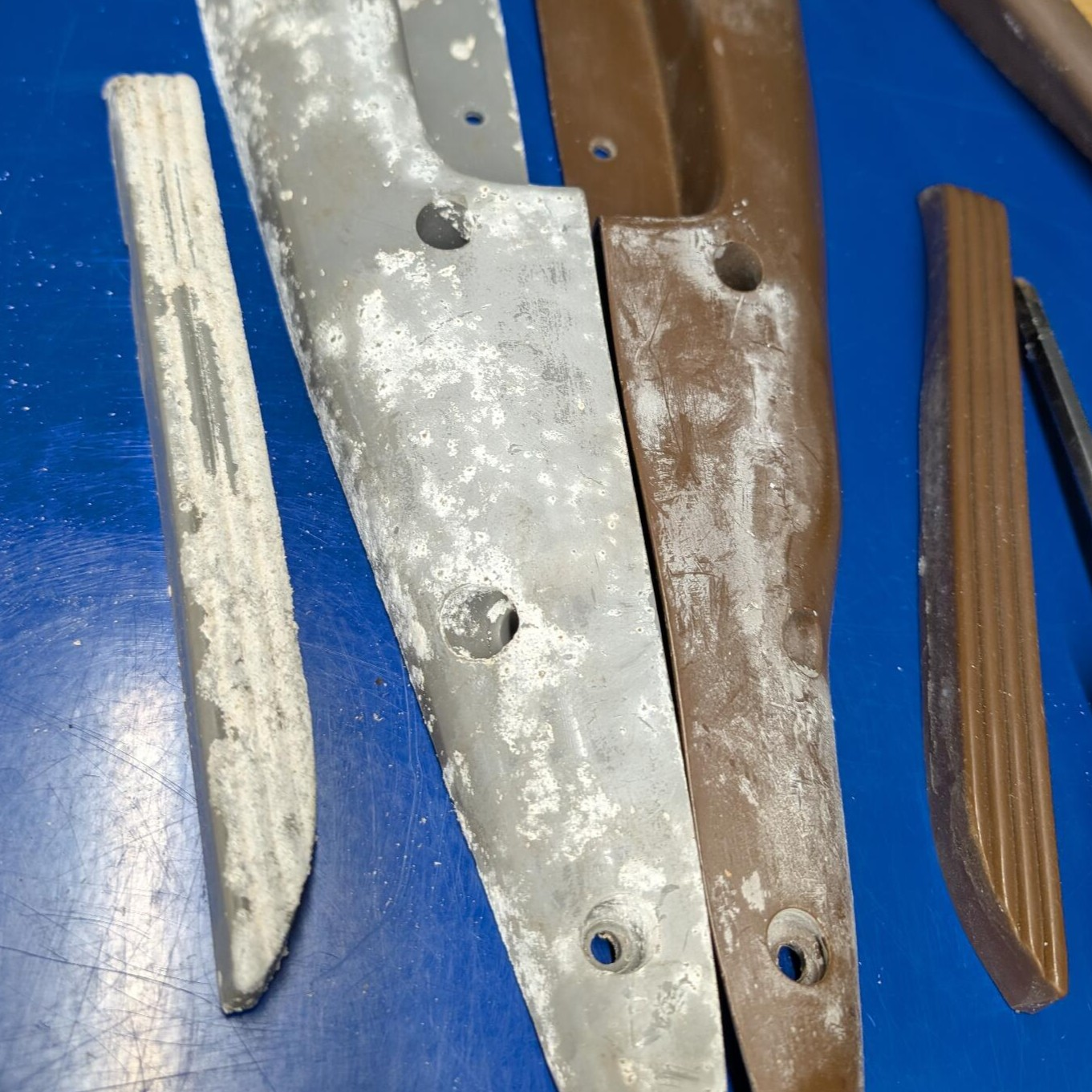
Pair of car armrests from 1952 showing significant decay.

Among the various uses for Tenite plastic included film reels for Kodak home movie stock. Film preservationists encounter decaying Tenite home movie reels producing areas of a white powdery exudate. Superficially resembling mold, the powder from Tenite decay is considered hazardous and proper gear, such as nitrile gloves, is recommended for handling. Some film preservationists have claimed that working with this decaying plastic has caused "problems with their eyes, nose, throat and lungs despite taking appropriate handling precautions".

In order to prevent decay and prolong the life of Tenite materials, the US National Park Service recommends such items be stored with a "stable temperature below 68°F (20 °C); stable RH between 30%-40%. Well ventilate, segregate; use gas adsorbents if stored in closed container."

The crystals may be removed using a medium grade of steel wool without damage to the underlying plastic, aside from very light scratching.
