= Mummy paper =

Paper made from linen

Mummy paper is paper that is claimed to be made from the linen wrappings and other fibers (e.g. papyrus) from Egyptian mummies imported to the United States circa 1855. The existence of this paper has not been conclusively confirmed, but it has been widely discussed.

== History ==
The history of mummy paper in America is intimately connected with the history of both American papermaking and papermaking in general.

=== Supply shortages ===
Paper can be said to have been born in ancient Egypt, circa 3000 B.C., with the invention of what the Romans called "papyrus", based on an earlier Greek name for the material. Papyrus is not paper in the modern sense of the word, since it was formed from compressed sheets of reed stalks and not a pulp. Paper made from a pulped plant fiber can be credited to Ts'ai Lun of China in 105 A.D., when he first presented the Emperor with a sheet of paper made from the inner bark of a mulberry tree. When the technique of papermaking found its way into Europe, paper was made not from trees but from a pulp of cotton and linen rag fibers. This technique of papermaking first came to America in Germantown, Pennsylvania in 1690 when William Rittenhouse established the first paper mill. Rittenhouse had been a papermaker in Amsterdam, the Netherlands before coming to America, bringing European techniques with him.

By the 1850s, papermaking in America was reaching a crisis point. America was producing more newspapers than any other country and its paper consumption was equal to England and France's combined. According to one 1856 estimate, it would take 6,000 wagons, each carrying two tons of paper, to carry all the paper consumed by American newspapers in a single year. This equals out to a need for 405,000,000 pounds of rags for the 800 paper mills then at work in the United States. Most of these rags were imported from Europe, with the largest source being from Italy. By 1854, however, Italy also started exporting rags to England, decreasing the supply available to American paper-makers. This meant that a substitute for or a new supply source of rags needed to be found, and quickly.

=== Isaiah Deck ===
At this same time period, Egyptian mummies were reasonably known to the public in America. Many mummies had been part of exhibits and had been shown in museums and traveling shows across the country. In fact, Dr. Pettigrew was the operator of one such show, where he would unwrap or unroll mummies in front of a crowd for their amusement. The impetus for a new supply source of rags for paper may have come from Dr. Isaiah Deck, an Englishman by birth, a New Yorker by residence, a geologist by trade, an archeologist by hobby and a determined explorer. On an earlier copper prospecting trip to Jamaica, Deck had evaluated other sources for paper including aloe, plantain, banana and dagger-grass, but none were acceptable. Thus, already preoccupied with paper and paper sources, Deck set out on a trip to Egypt in 1847 to search for Cleopatra's lost emerald mines. Deck's father, also named Isaiah, had known Giovanni Belzoni, a famous Italian explorer of Egyptian tombs; Deck the younger thus inherited from his father some Egyptian artifacts, including a piece of linen from a mummy.

While searching for the lost mines, Deck couldn't help but notice the plethora of mummies and mummy parts that turned up in communal burial sites called "mummy pits." He wrote, "So numerous are they in some localities out of the usual beaten tracks of most travelers, that after the periodical storms whole areas may be seen stripped of sand, and leaving fragments and limbs exposed in such plenty and variety." Deck did some calculations: assume two thousand years of widespread embalming, an average life span of thirty-three years, and a stable population of eight million. This would leave you with about five hundred million mummies. Add to that the number of mummified animals including cats, bulls and crocodiles, and the number drastically rises. Deck also states, "it is by no means rare to find above 30 lbs. weight of linen wrappings on mummies...A princess from the late Mr. Pettigrew's collection was swathed in 40 thicknesses, producing 42 yards of the finest texture." Deck further calculated that the average consumption of paper in America is about 15 lbs. per person per year. This meant that the supply of Egyptian mummies would be able to keep up with the American demand for about 14 years, by which point a substitute supply source or material would likely have been discovered, rendering the need for rags unnecessary.

== Evidence ==
Whether or not American paper mills took Isaiah Deck's proposal seriously cannot be either conclusively proved or rejected. However, some evidence does remain.

=== Dard Hunter ===
Dard Hunter is a well-known paper researcher and cataloguer and a proponent of handmade paper. His book, Papermaking: The History and Technique of an Ancient Craft, relates the experiments of I. Augustus Stanwood in both ground-wood paper and mummy paper. Hunter received his information from Stanwood's son Daniel, a professor of international law. According to Daniel, during the American Civil War his father was hard-pressed for materials for his Maine mill. As such, he imported mummies from Egypt, stripped the bodies of their wrappings, and used this material for making paper. Several shiploads of mummies were brought to the mill in Gardiner, Maine and were thus used to make a brown wrapping paper for grocers, butchers and other merchants. Professor Stanwood continues on to report that the rags supposedly caused a cholera outbreak among the workers since there were no standards for disinfection at this time. However, since cholera is actually a bacterium, it is unlikely that active disease cells could have survived for centuries in the wrappings, meaning the outbreak at the plant was likely either from poor personal hygiene of the workers or from dirty rags recently imported from deceased Europeans, primarily Frenchmen, and Italians, rather than the mummy rags.

Hunter also writes in an extensive footnote of a letter he received from a Mrs. John Ramsey of Syracuse, New York, relating the story her father's friend used to tell her of his days in a paper mill in Broadalbin, New York. He worked there from 1855 to 1860 and was one of the men responsible for unrolling the old linen wrappings from the mummies the mill received. She wrote to Hunter that "the rolled-up vestments retained the shape of the mummy, so that when the workmen tried to straighten or unroll the 'cocoon'...it sprang back at once into the shape of the mummy it had encased so long." She also describes the material as cream-colored linen still bearing fragments of embroidery on the edges.

Hunter also writes about and quotes from Deck's proposal on the importation of mummies. However, Hunter refers to the work as a manuscript, leaving Joseph Dane to dismiss the work off-hand, stating that the work could not be found and implying that Hunter invented it to suit his purpose. This claim of Dane must also be dismissed, since authors both before and since Dane, including Deck's contemporaries and modern authors, among which are both Wolfe and Baker, have been able to find copies of this paper. Dane also dismisses Deck's writing, and therefore Hunter's, on the basis that it is in the mode of Swiftonian satire. He cites Deck's references to thrift, concern with alleviating shortages and his precision in his calculations as further evidence of his writing in the manner of Book 3 of Gulliver's Travels. Dane also writes that Hunter should have realized that Deck wasn't serious, thus questioning Hunter's own authority in the field.

=== Evidence from periodicals ===
It is a verifiable fact that rags from Egypt were imported during this time period. Joel Munsell was a prolific printer and publisher from Albany, New York and he kept a scrapbook of articles relating to his trade. This eventually became the basis for his book Chronology of the Origin and Progress of Paper and Paper-Making. For an entry from 1855, Munsell records that a cargo of 1215 bales of Egyptian rags arrived and were purchased by J Priestly & Co. for about 4 cents a pound. His source, the Paper Trade Reporter, stated that the final purchase price for the transaction was $25,000. The next year, the New York Tribune wrote that about two and a quarter million pounds of rags have been imported from Egypt.

Articles discussing the practicality and the financial implications of the import of mummies for paper for the government of Egypt and American paper mills were also published in the 7 July 1847 issue of The Friend, the 19 June 1847 issue of Scientific American and the 17 December 1847 issue of the Cold War Fountain. While none of these articles confirm the manufacture of said paper in America, they do prove that the concept was both widely spoken of and under discussion in well-known and respected periodicals of the day.

Another article ran in the April 1873 edition of The Druggists' Circular and Chemical Gazette that described an 1866 visit of a New York businessman to Alexandria. There, he purchased and "exported to the United States 'mummies from the catacombs' to be converted to pulp for papermaking." This article also pointed out that mummies weren't ideal for printing paper due to the various oils and botanicals included in the rags, which lead to the discoloration of the paper. This corroborates Hunter's report that Stanwood's mill used the mummies to make brown butcher paper.

On 31 July 1856, the Syracuse Standard ran a notice in its paper that informed readers that it was printed on paper made from rags imported directly from Egypt. The rags were imported by Mr. G.W. Ryan and were processed at his plant in Marcellus Falls. Munsell adds the note that the rags were stripped from mummies. Hunter reports that he is unable to find a copy of this issue, and Dane takes this to mean that the paper didn't claim to have been printed on mummy paper, but just on rags from the region of mummies. Baker, however, has located a copy of the paper at the Onondaga Historical Association and confirmed both the wording of the notice and the physical difference of this issue from those before it.

=== Evidence against mummy paper ===
Dane argues that mummy paper cannot possibly exist because all the references to the paper are either vaguely documented or are the product of oral history. He also argues that they have an aura of Swift about them and that all the original writers have the intent of satire. Dane also states that neither the copy of the Standard on mummy paper can be found, nor can Deck's article be found, both of which statements have clearly been proven wrong.

There are indeed some facts that make proving the concrete existence of mummy paper impossible. First off, the paper from the Standard and the Norwich broadside cannot be chemically tested to prove they are from mummies, as the test would only prove they are made of linen. Nor can they be carbon-14 dated. This test requires the burning of the material, meaning that items that exist in only one or two copies would have to be destroyed to complete the test, something that clearly cannot be done. Also, mummies were made for over 4,000 years in Egypt, so even a time frame for the paper product wouldn't narrow down the age of the material to a useful window for solid conclusions to be made. Additionally, the percentage of mummy cloth to any other rag in a given pulp mixture could skew the results of the test. DNA testing would also prove to be inconclusive, as the only thing this test would verify is that the material at one point had close contact with a human.

Outside of scientific tests, there are no extant records of paper mills buying mummies. If there were records or account books, they have either been lost or recycled by the mill itself for more paper. There are no photographs of mummies or mummy wrappings at any paper mills. Shipping records and custom records have likewise vanished. However, these may not have proved anything conclusively either; since rags for paper were duty-free at this time, the cargo wouldn't have needed to have been declared. Even if the mummy rags had been declared, they probably would have been declared as rags for paper, without the provenance given.

== Other industrial uses for mummies ==
Perhaps the most famous claimed use of mummies in other industries than papermaking appeared in Mark Twain's novel Innocents Abroad. He writes of the practice then current on the Egyptian railroad of using mummies for fuel to power the locomotives.

I shall not speak of the railway, for it is like any other railway—I shall only say that the fuel they use for the locomotive is composed of mummies three thousand years old, purchased by the ton or by the graveyard for that purpose and that sometimes one hears the profane engineer call out pettishly, "D--n these plebeians, they don't burn worth a cent—pass out a King ...

This master storyteller was speaking tongue in cheek. He lets the reader in on the joke in the next passage, which reads "Stated to me for a fact. I only tell it as I got it. I am willing to believe it. I can believe anything." This story has been mentioned by a number of seemingly reliable secondary sources, including an article in Scientific American in 1859 and, more recently, a paper published for BBC News in 2011. As Heather Pringle noted in her definitive book The Mummy Congress, "no expert has ever been able to authenticate the story ... Twain seems to be the only published source -- and a rather suspect one at that."

There are many sources relating to the use of ground-up mummies (mummia) in pharmaceuticals. In fact, Merck & Company sold mummy up until 1910. Ground-up mummified bodies also produce a brown pigment, still referred to as "mummy brown" or "Egyptian brown". The color is no longer produced from mummies. Additional by-products of mummies include the distillation of the bodies to produce aromatic oils, such as olibanum and ambergris, which can be made into machine oils, soaps or even incense. Clearly, mummies were a multi-product import of choice, much as the buffalo or whale had been before them.

== See also ==
- Ancient Egyptian burial customs
- Dard Hunter
- Innocents Abroad
- Liber Linteus, an Etruscan text written on linen, later used as mummy wrappings.
- Mummy
- Nicholson Baker
- Paper
- Papermaking
- Preservation (library and archival science)
