= Preservation of magnetic audiotape =

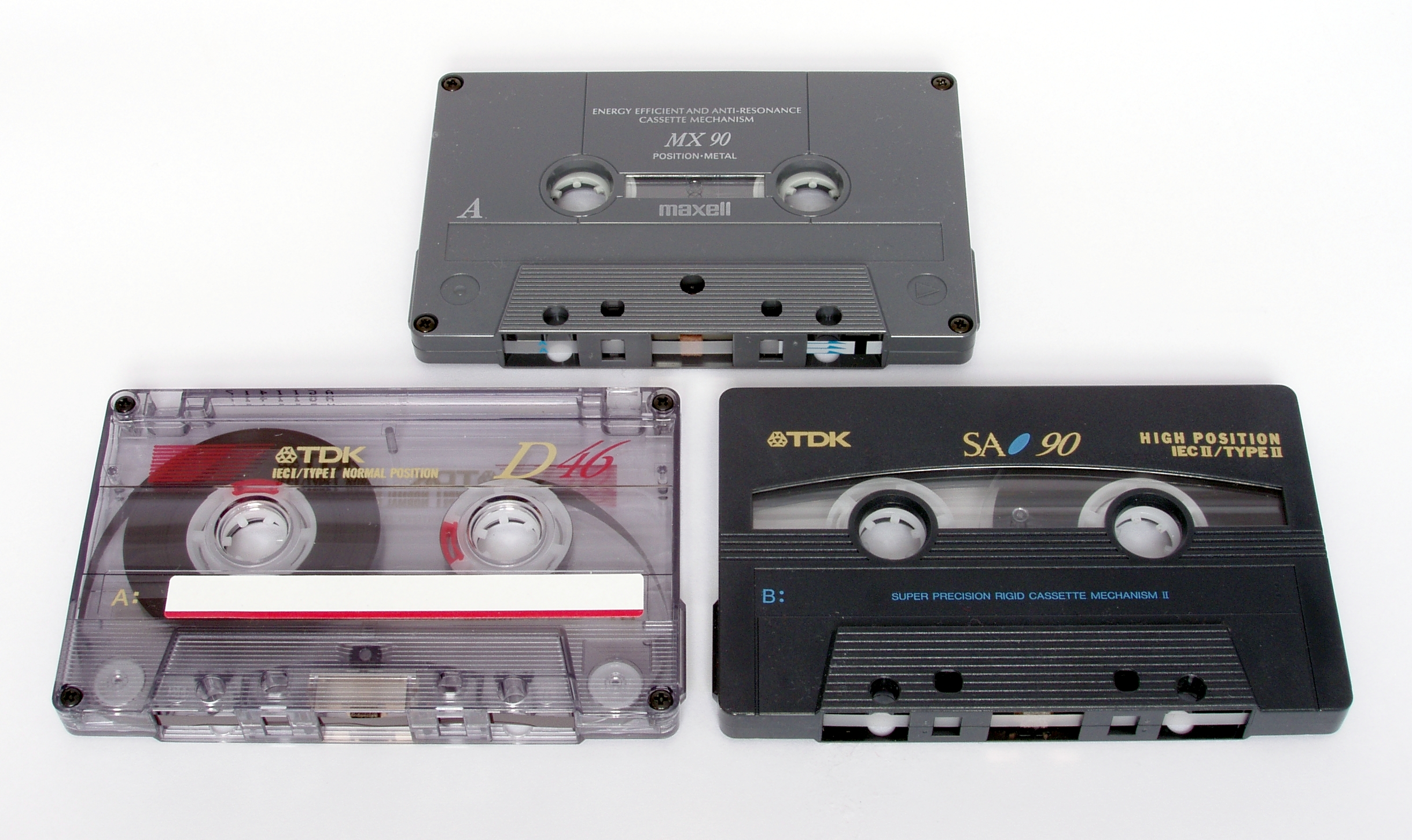
Magnetic audiotape cassettes

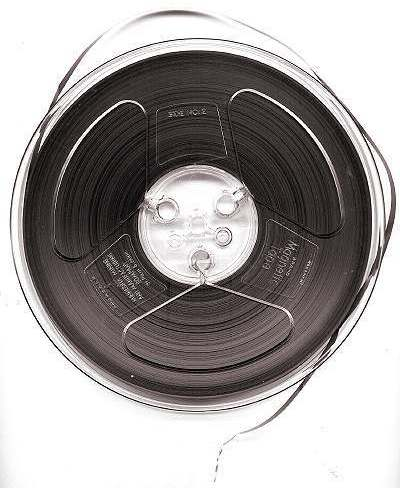
7-inch reel of magnetic tape

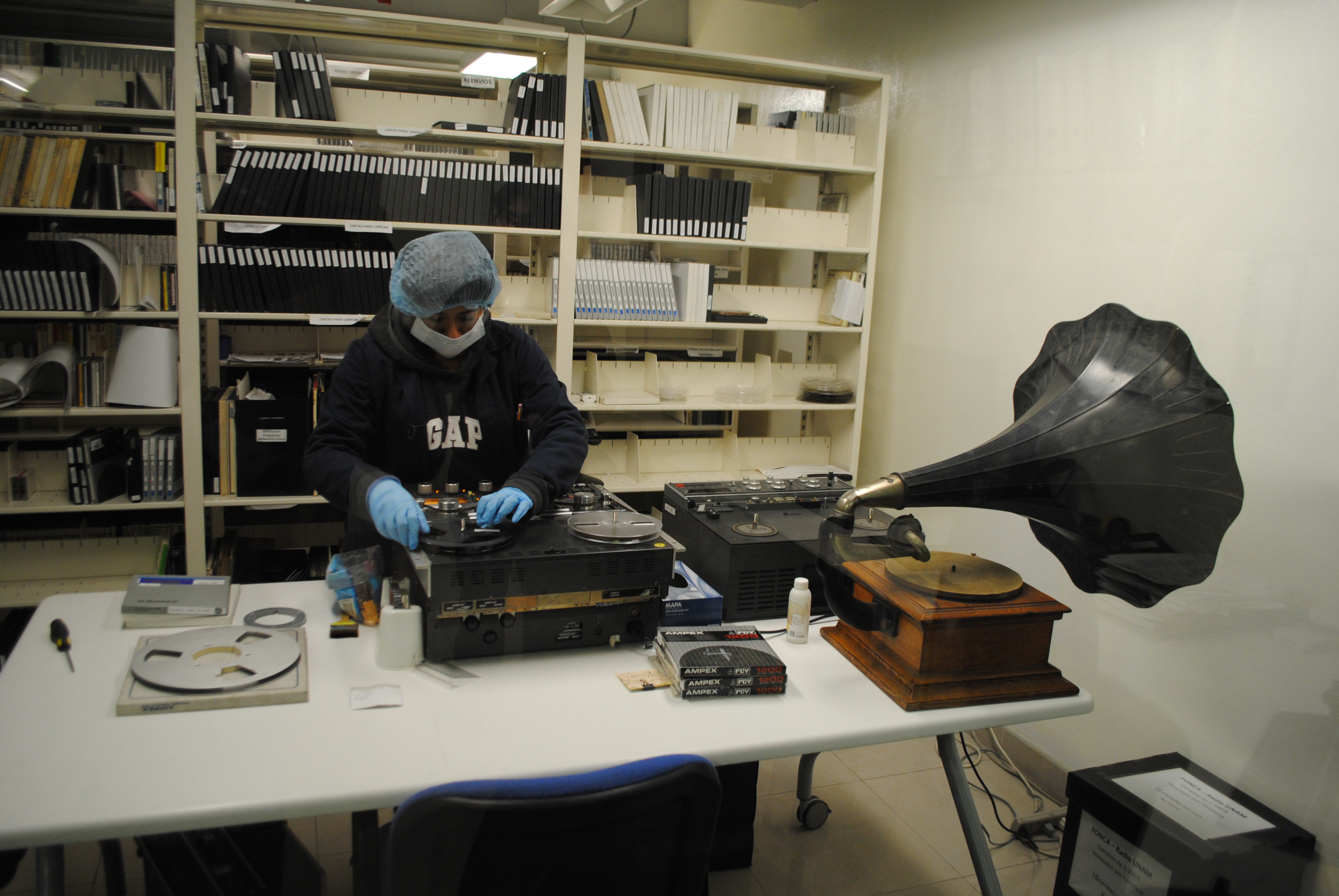
Preservation and recording of tapes at Fonoteca Nacional (National Sound Archive of Mexico).

Preservation of magnetic audiotape comprises techniques for handling, cleaning and storage of magnetic audiotapes in an archival repository. Multiple types of magnetic media exist but are mainly in the form of open reels or enclosed cassettes. Although digitization of materials on fragile magnetic media in library and information science is a common practice, there remains a need for conserving the actual physical magnetic tape and playback equipment as artifacts.

== Structure of magnetic tape ==
The first magnetic tapes were manufactured by BASF in Germany in 1932. They were designed with iron carbonyl as the magnetic pigment mixed into the cellulose acetate carrier. Production soon moved to iron oxide coated onto cellulose acetate rolls, cut into uniform strips, and wound onto plastic or metal hubs. Recordists began recording sound on magnetic media in the twenties in the form of magnetic wire. After World War II, the advantages of tape in terms of sturdiness and the ability to edit by cutting and splicing made tape preferable to wire as the magnetic medium of choice. Tape consists of a coating of a magnetic pigment, typically iron oxide (Fe_{2}O_{3}), on a long strip of polyester (polyethelyne terephthalate) base film. This base film has been used since the mid-sixties as a replacement for acetate bases film that was prone to chemical instability.

== Sticky-shed syndrome ==
A new problem with chemical stability became notable in the mid-seventies when two significant tape manufacturers changed their dispersion formulations by introducing a polyurethane binder that, in time, turned hygroscopic and broke down as it absorbed water molecules into the long hydrocarbon molecular chains. The tape coatings became sticky and shed oxide onto all tape recorder parts in their path, including heads, guides, rollers, and capstans. This is commonly called sticky-shed syndrome. Although the problem was confined to two of the four major tape manufacturers (neither BASF nor 3M studio tapes suffer from the problem because neither manufacturer used the hygroscopic binder), the reputation of all magnetic tapes has been tainted by the defect.

Information can be recovered from the "sticky-shed" tapes by heating them at a very low temperature in order to drive the water out of the binders. The baking method is a one-time solution to the problem because the binder remains unstable. Tapes that do not show the breakdown syndrome do not need any special treatment.

== Handling ==
It is advised that open reels are handled by the center hub area or by the outer edges of the reel flanges, if necessary, and that the actual tape is not touched. If the outer flanges must be used, do not squeeze the edges of the reel flanges together, as it will damage the edges of the tape. If possible, handle by the center hub only. Similarly, it is recommended that cassettes be handled by the existing outer plastic case and that fingers not be placed anywhere inside the cassette mechanism.

== Cleaning ==
Magnetic tape must be kept clean in order to prevent scratching and deterioration. Dust on the surface of the tape will cause friction between the tape and the tape heads on the playback equipment, which will scratch the oxide layer. The website for sound preservation hosted by the National Library of Canada classifies dirt in two classes: Foreign matter (fingerprints, dust) and alteration of the original state (chemical reactions caused by grime and dirt deposited on the tape surface). In any event, the tapes must be properly cleaned.

Recommended methods for removing dust on tapes include using a small vacuum with a hose or wiping with 3M Tape Cleaning Fabric. Care must be used when using a vacuum if a hose attachment is available. If the motor of the vacuum is powerful enough, it can demagnetize the tape, and the recording will be compromised. Many of the professional companies for tape restoration recommend professional help for proper care. They are generally correct to recommend this, as it is a delicate process that requires training if one plans to undertake serious chemical or physical repair. Vidipax, a professional tape restoration company, recommends using Pellon fabric or cloth as the safest and most efficient way to clean tapes. They warn against using solvents at all costs unless the tapes have already been submerged in water or another solvent (in the case of a flood). They also remind tape owners or collections managers that baking tapes to reverse hydrolysis is rarely a permanent fix and permanently alters the make-up of the tape.

== Storage ==
As is the case with any collection, proper storage is extremely important. The general environment, including temperature and relative humidity, is key. The proper levels vary depending on how long the materials need to be stored. The Library of Congress recommends that any tapes needing preservation for a minimum of 10 years should be stored between 65–70 °F (18–21 °C) at 45-50% relative humidity (RH). Large fluctuations in either of these factors should be avoided at all costs. If the tapes need permanent preservation, they should be stored at 46–50 °F (8–10 °C) at 20-30% relative humidity. In the case of magnetic tapes, contrary to traditional preservation storage rules for books and photographic film, colder is certainly not better. If the collections are stored below 46 °F (8 °C), the tape lubricant can separate from the base, ruining the recording. The most important thing is to keep conditions consistent once desirable conditions are achieved.

The National Library of Canada recommends that one and a half rounds of a previously unused tape should be cut off, so as to remove any adhesive at the end, which could later be transferred to the tape or machinery. They also recommend not storing any paper labels in the box with reel-to-reel tapes to prevent chemical transfer from the paper and/or printing processes used on the paper to the tape.

The Library of Congress recommends that tapes with water repellent plastic containers be stored vertically on edge, not flat, and that reel-to-reel boxes need not be separated, but should be stored vertically with bookends, so as not to fall. Also, it is always important to remember that these collections will be very heavy and should be shelved on strong, non-acidic shelving.

Tapes should only be rewound just before the next play. When rewinding, if possible, use a slower archival wind technique. Although super-speed rewinders may seem convenient, they will warp and damage tapes over time. Professional media librarians at the National Library of Canada suggest that the best way to achieve an archival wind for reel-to-reel tapes is to remove the heads on the player and play backwards at normal play speed. However, the tape tension may need to be adjusted after removing the heads.

== Digitization ==
Sometimes, a tape may be so fragile that the only long-term method for preservation is to transfer the media to a digital format. However, all of the above precautions still must be taken with collections in order to achieve a proper transfer. The materials must be in good enough condition to play in order to be digitized; therefore, one should not count on digitization as a safety net.
