= Pamela Darling =

American librarian (born 1943)

- Born: Pamela W. Darling; August 31, 1943 (age 82); Lake Forest, Illinois, U.S.
- Education: Northwestern University (BA); Columbia University (MLS)
- Occupation: Librarian

Pamela W. Darling (born August 31, 1943) was an American library preservation specialist. She was a leader in developing preservation procedures and planning for academic libraries. She developed a grid that is helpful in prioritizing preservation activities.

== Overview ==
Pamela Darling stressed the importance of preservation since the beginning of her career in the 1970s. She wrote many journal articles and several books stressing the need for a national plan for preservation. She urged the library profession to make preservation a priority "in which organization and cooperation are essential: standards-making, professional education, policy development, influencing legislation..." She also declared that preservation is the responsibility and duty of all library staff and anyone having to do with books, from publishers to users.

== Significance to preservation ==
As the preservation specialist for the Association of Research Libraries, Office of Management Studies in 1980, Pamela Darling helped develop and test planning procedures for academic libraries to identify preservation problem areas and what to do about them. In 1982, along with Duane E. Webster, she wrote Preservation Planning Program: An Assisted Self-Study Manual for Libraries, a practical guide for an organized preservation program plan. Dartmouth College, the University of Washington, and the University of Virginia tested the ideas in the manual. Evaluations and suggestions from these schools were used to update future editions of the manual. Darling's work enabled academic libraries to establish or add to preservation programs without having to invent their own plan.

Darling also developed a method to prioritize preservation activities that she included in the manual. She created a grid containing four boxes to help determine which actions should be given the highest priority. Actions that have high impact and are easy to put into practice are put into Box 1; actions that are easy to put into practice but have little impact are put into Box 2; actions that have high impact but are hard to do are put into Box 3; and actions that are hard to do and have little impact are put into Box 4. According to Darling, the highest priority should be given to the actions in Box 1 since they have the highest impact and can be easily done. The actions in Box 3 should be accomplished because of their high impact. The actions in Box 2 and Box 4 could be eliminated since they both would have little impact.

== Education and career ==
Pamela W. Darling was born August 31, 1943, in Lake Forest, Illinois. She graduated from Northwestern University in 1965, with a Bachelor of Arts in English, and from Columbia University in 1970–71, with a Master's in Library Science. She started her career at the Library of Congress in 1971, and became an Executive Assistant in the Process Department in 1972. She was the Head of the Preservation Program Office at the New York Public Library from 1973 to 1974. From 1974 to 1980, Darling was the Head of the Preservation Department for the Columbia University Libraries. She became the Preservation Specialist for the Association of Research Libraries, Office of Management Studies in 1981.

== Selected bibliography ==
- Darling, Pamela W. "Call To Action." Library Journal. 101.20 (15 November 1976): 2342.
- Darling, Pamela W. From Problems Perceived to Programs in Practice: The Preservation of Library Resources in the U.S.A., 1956-1980. American Library Association, 1981.
- Darling, Pamela W. "Preservation Epilogue: Signs of Hope." Library Journal.104.15(1 September 1979): 1627.
- Darling, Pamela W. "Preservation: a National Plan at Last?" Library Journal. 102.4(15 Feb. 1977): 447–449.
- Darling, Pamela W., and Duane E. Webster. Preservation Planning Program: An Assisted Self-Study Manual for Libraries. Association of Research Libraries, 1993.
- Darling, Pamela W. "Preservation: Today on a Shoestring, Tomorrow...?" Library Journal. 105.7(1 April 1980): 781–785.
- Ogden, Sherelyn. "Considerations for Prioritizing." Preservation Leaflets. 2007.
