= Book preservation in developing countries =

Book preservation in developing countries is a growing concern among preservation and conservation librarians. As of result of a lack of sufficient resources and training, developing countries are unable to maintain books and manuscripts as part of their cultural history. Environmental conditions are one of the greatest threats to these materials. Political instability also endangers library and museum collections. Recent contributions are helping to address specific needs and promote the development of preservation programs.

== Overview ==
All library collections experience damage from use and decay from the aging process. Due to a variety of economic, historic, environmental and political factors, libraries and archival repositories in developing countries face exceptional challenges in book and manuscript preservation. Southeast Asia, Africa, and the Middle East have been identified as areas with materials having critical need for preservation. Local librarians and archivists struggle to provide access for patrons while protecting the structural integrity of materials against damage from over-use, neglect, and extreme climate conditions.

This is especially difficult as print materials in developing countries are often created using fragile, non-lasting paper product and ink. Providing information and education about preservation practices and principles is becoming an increasing focus for professionals working in countries with established practices. Going back to at least the year 2000, efforts have been made to establish a decision matrix and guidelines for preservation workers in developing countries to use in implementing preservation and conservation programs.

== Efforts to improve preservation ==
In August 1985, John F. Dean became Cornell University Library's first preservation and conservation librarian. Dean's efforts helped the Department of Preservation and Conservation at Cornell to grow into one of the leading programs of its kind in the United States. Aside from his work at Cornell, Dean has made important contributions towards improving preservation efforts in developing countries. He has created online tutorials for library conservation and preservation in Southeast Asia and Iraq and the Middle East. The tutorials are designed so that librarians and archivists in these and other countries have a set of basic guidelines to refer to when dealing with preservation issues. Specific topics addressed in the tutorials include "Management and Planning", "Preservation", "Building Capacity" and "Supporting the Effort". Both tutorials are available in English; the tutorial for Iraq and the Middle East is also available in Arabic.

== Area specific problems and actions ==
=== Bulgaria ===
The L’viv National University Library in Bulgaria received enough funds from their government to build a new facility to house extra collections and offices. However the new building, with its brand new heating system has caused the collections to deteriorate much more rapidly than those collections stored in the main building which has thick stone walls and a naturally occurring stable environment. These countries are coping with the transition from being under Soviet rule to self-governing states.

=== India ===
The advancement of technology and IT professions in India has resulted in a large number of digital library projects across the country. The main problem these initiatives are running into are access and copyright laws.

=== Ukraine ===
Conservators at the Ukraine V. Stefanyk Scientific Library of the National Academy of Sciences make the effort to adapt advanced preservation techniques to their home area by hiring local craftsmen to manufacture necessary tools and equipment.

=== United States (Puerto Rico) ===
Munoz-Sola points out the impracticality of mounting modern environmental controls in a library to stabilize temperature and humidity in the balmy Puerto Rican climate. The expense involved in creating an ideal environment in both energy and manpower would counteract positive outcomes for the condition of collections. Puerto Rico also has an additional concern with preservation: due to political instability in the past, many libraries and collections have been destroyed, which places a greater need on preserving what is left. Munoz-Sola also points out that many developing countries are in tropical climates, and thus face these problems.

== See also ==
- Archival science
- Disaster recovery

== Selected bibliography ==
- Axer, Peter. "Conservation at the South African Library." Quarterly Bulletin of the South African Library. 51.3 (March 1997): 86–92.
- Baird, B. J. & Schaffner, B. L. "Slow fires still burn: results of a preservation assessment of libraries in L’viv, Ukraine and Sofia, Bulgaria." College & Research Libraries. 64.4 (2003): 318–330.
- Chepesiuk, Ron. Mission Possible: Two U.S. Libraries Reach Out to Muslims in Asia." American Libraries. 33.7 (August 2002): 56-58.
- College and Research Libraries News. 66.10 (November 2005): 708-709.
- Dean, John F. "Digital Imaging and Conservation: Model Guidelines" Library Trends. 52.1 (Summer 2003): 133–137.
- Dean, John F. "Conservation Essays" Library Journal. 108.19 (1 November 1983): 2036.
- Hedberg, Jane. "Web-Based Tutorial." College and Research Libraries News. 64.1 (January 2003): 40.
- Jeevan, V. K. "Digital library development: identifying sources of content for developing countries with special reference to India." International Information & Library Review. 36.3 (2004): 185–197.
- Maele, Veronica. "Africa in the Digital Age: Opportunities and Threats to the Preservation of Library and Archival Materials." S. A. Archives Journal. 43 (2003): 69–78.
- Munoz-Sola, H. "Preservation of library materials in a tropical climate. The Puerto Rican experience." Science & Technology Libraries. 7.3 (1987): 41–47.
- Ngulube, Patrick, and Lindiwe Magazi. "Protecting Documents Against Disasters and Theft: The Challenge Before the Public Libraries in KwaZulu-Natal, South Africa." South African Journal of Library and Information Science. 72.3 (2006): 185–197.
