= Paul N. Banks =

American book conservator (1934–2000)

Paul Banks (April 15, 1934 – May 10, 2000) was Conservator and Head of the Conservation Department and Laboratory at the Newberry Library from 1964 to 1981. He left the Newberry Library in 1981 to establish the first United States degree-granting program in library preservation at the Columbia University School of Library Service. Banks published widely on library preservation, conservation issues, and education.

== Biography ==
He was born in California in 1934 as an only child, and was drawn to fine printing techniques, a skill not offered in colleges and universities. Banks studied at Carnegie Institute of Technology in Pittsburgh before working in book production and typography in New York City for Viking Press and Clark & Way from 1956 to 1960. During this time he took evening courses at Columbia in book related topics. The next four years were spent in part-time jobs, giving book binding lessons, and writing reports for the Journal of the Guild of Book Workers.

== Career ==
He was appointed Conservator at the Conservation Department at the Newberry Library in Chicago when it was established in 1964. At the Newberry, he improved repair practices and began training apprentices and other staff in conservation; many future conservators received training there. In 1971, the Newberry Library Conservation Laboratory was established with Banks as the Director; he continued in this capacity until he left in 1981.

At the Newberry, he published on conservation topics and developed leaflets to help beginning conservators find resources and training. His paper at the 1969 Annual Meeting of the American Institute for Conservation of Historic and Artistic Works (AIC) was the first paper on book conservation ever given at the conference. He served as President of the AIC from 1978 to 1980 and was the first president to be a professional book conservator.

He left the Newberry in 1981 to help establish a conservation and preservation program at the Columbia University School of Library Service, and remained until the school was closed in 1992. The preservation program then moved to the University of Texas at Austin, where he taught until his retirement. According to Ellen McCrady, a former student, Banks’ lectures were the “heart of the program.”

Gary Frost, a co-worker of Banks at the Newberry and 2006 winner of the Paul Banks and Carolyn Harris Preservation Award, writes, "Paul's greatest legacy to the future has been and will be his library school based training program for preservation administrators and library conservators."

== Paul Banks and Carolyn Harris Preservation Award ==
The Paul Banks and Carolyn Harris Preservation Award was established to honor Paul Banks and Carolyn Harris by the Association for Library Collections & Technical Services (ALCTS), a division of the American Library Association.

== Selected bibliography ==
- Banks, P. N. (1974). "Environmental standards for storage of books and manuscripts." Library Journal, 99(3), 339–343.
- Banks, P. N. (1976). "Books in peril: Cooperative approaches to conservation." Library Journal. 101(20), 2348–51.
- Banks, P. N. (1979). "Education for conservators." Library Journal, 104(9), 1013–1017.
- Banks, Paul N. (1981). "Education in Library Conservation". Library Trends. 30 (2): 189–201.
- Banks, P. N. (1981). A selective bibliography on the conservation of research library materials. Chicago: Newberry Library.
- Banks, P. N. (1987). Preservation of Library Materials. Chicago: Newberry Library.
- Banks, Paul N. (1990). "Preservation, Library Collections, and the Concept of Cultural Property". In Dain, Phyllis; Cole, John Y. (eds.). Libraries and Scholarly Communication in the United States: The Historical Dimension. New York: Greenwood Press.
- Banks, P. N. (1995). "ISR/ASTM workshop on paper aging." Conservation Administration News, (60), 22.
- Banks, P. N. (2000). "Environment and building design for preservation of library materials." Preservation. Chicago: American Library Association.
- Banks, P. N. & Pilette, R. (2000). Preservation: Issues and Planning. Chicago: American Library Association.
