= Inventory (library and archive) =

Validation of items present in a collection against official inventories

In the context of libraries and archives, an inventory refers to a detailed list or record of the items, materials, or resources held within a collection.

== Overview ==
It helps to document and organize the contents, making it easier for staff to manage, locate, and track items. An inventory typically includes information such as titles, authors, publication dates, call numbers, and other relevant details about each item in the collection. It is the one method that libraries and archives use to determine whether some items in their collection are in need of preservation or conservation activities. A modern inventory might involve examining item by item with a barcode scanner and a laptop, with the objective of adjusting bibliographic and item records in theirs and OCLC's WorldCat databases. Using a laptop and handheld bar code reader will "reduce human error and inconsistencies, while helping to maintain staff concentration and enthusiasm for the project".

Print materials in the digital age, though dramatically decreased in size compared to e-print materials, are still valuable components of a library's collection. Increasing print material's accessibility, and reducing user frustration, make the inventory process an effective tool in improving library service quality. "When library users are unable to find materials in the expected locations, they lose confidence in the library catalog as well as in the library itself". Missing or mislabeled books have a direct impact on the quality of library services. Maintaining the stacks through inventories and shelf reading can mitigate staff time lost searching for missing or mislabeled items.

Libraries have thousands of books; large academic libraries may have millions of books. Doing an annual (or less frequent) physical inventory with the laying on of hands on each individual item may not be practical for several reasons. It may not be financially feasible, employees required may not have extra time to devote to such an inventory, and there are no financial rewards for the Library for completing an inventory. Problems that are discovered (books in need of repurchase, rebinding, repair, or digitization) may require solutions that are expensive and labor-intensive. Because of these restraints, inventories may not take place for decades, if ever, at large academic institutions. By contrast, complete inventories are often a regular part of the school library media specialist's job at K-12 institutions, where inventory may be a legal requirement that shows that the libraries are accountable for the money they have spent throughout the year. Checking for lost books and materials can be similarly compared to auditing.

However, there are alternative options to performing a complete inventory, such as performing a selective inventory. Selective inventory can be performed by circumstance or by data prediction. Physical space is a premium in libraries. Inventorying mini collections before relocating them to their new location presents the library with an opportunity to perform a selective inventory project. An alternative to opportunistic selective inventory projects is Kohl's (1982) assertion that circulation statistics, book search statistics, and ILL statistics can be useful tools in identifying areas as possible selective inventory areas. He writes, "areas in need of an inventory can be identified through the use of predictive data". Once the objectives for accuracy and methods of measuring have been established "the criteria need to be quantified. An overall measure of the inventory accuracy should be maintained as a management key performance indicator".

== The role of inventories ==
Although collecting new materials is viewed as a central mission of the library, maintaining the condition of library collections, which includes less satisfactory activities such as weeding, book repair, shifting and counting what libraries think they have on their shelves, are also a vital part of the library's mission to provide access to current patrons, as well as those people who will use the library at some point in the future.

Each time an inventory is conducted the physical condition of the collection and bibliographic representation problems are identified and addressed. "This enables the integrity of the OPAC to be strengthened, [making] it a more effective resource for users". Improved accessibility of collections for users has a tremendous impact on patron service and how the library is perceived. During an inventory process "library staff gain knowledge of the collection and are [better] able to provide stronger customer service." Patrons benefit from the confidence library staff gain in their collections and in their collection development skills. Inventories help guarantee that the collections as listed in Online public access catalogs and Finding aids do not lack integrity. School libraries also use the inventory to assess the collection (numbers, age and ratio:student) against benchmarks of accrediting institutions, and also to examine each resource and determine its future in the collection based on age, relevance, currency and condition—which may include repair, replacement, disposal or cleaning to ensure that attractive, up-to-date resources are available for patrons. Inventory can also identify anomalies in the catalog and provide an opportunity to correct catalog records and labeling of items. This is also a time when shelves can be rearranged to minimize overcrowding to prevent damage.

== Sampling ==
Sampling is a compromise measure, which can be an important management tool. Random sampling of library collections can give a quick and clear assessment measure of a collection—whether the books are present, and whether those books present are in good physical condition. In 1982, the California State University libraries, suggested inventory procedures to insure that the 19 campus collections were secure and intact. They recognized that a complete regular inventory was too expensive, and decided that the best method of assessing book loss would be to use sampling. Every three years, a sample was to be taken of an identified number of items in each Library of Congress letter classification. If loss rates were more than 1% for two years in a row, this would indicate that a full inventory was needed.

"A random sampling of the collection serves as an indicator for the rest of the collection. If all the items are accounted for in a random sampling, then it can be assumed that rest of the collections' records is just as reliable. However, a complete inventory provides the institution with the knowledge that the entire collection can be accounted for; the random sampling is used to check the consistency of the collections' records."

=== Determining the sample size and items ===
First, it must be determined if the entire collection, including stacks, reference and special collections will be sampled together or if just a particular area will be analyzed. At the University of Illinois, their bookstacks included government publications and the Asian library, but these special holdings were not included in their study. Unbound items may also be excluded.

Next, the Library needs to decide upon the size of its sample. More datapoints, of course result in more accurate data about the collection. There are two types of errors possible in sampling: tolerance and confidence. Tolerance is the unexact percentage, a maximum deviation from the nominal error value, for example, a survey question may be accurate for 85-95% of the population, it could also be stated 90% ±5; in this case, the tolerance is five. Confidence is the second error, measuring the certainty of a true answer within the limits stated in the tolerance. If there is a 90 per cent confidence, it is predicted that if the sample study is repeated ten times using different samples, but with the same tolerance, then the results would be accurate for nine of those studies out of ten.

In the table below, for a tolerance of ±5%, the sample sizes for a collection of more than 50,000 books would be 381 items for 95% confidence, and 648 items for 99% confidence. To achieve a lower tolerance of ±1% one would have to sample thousands of books, which might stretch the resources available for even a sample inventory. Surveying 270 to 655 volumes is much more reasonable for the average-sized library staff.

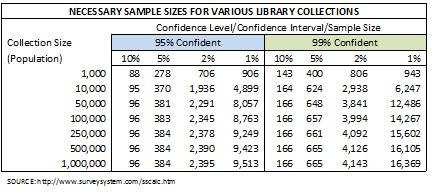

An alternative for counting hundreds of books in a given random sample is to count until you know that you do or do not have a problem. The Prescott Memorial Library at Louisiana Tech employed sequential analysis in the late 1980s when working on automation of the collections.

Random selection of the books can take place in a couple of different ways. If in addition to the physical condition of items, a library also wants to know whether items are missing from shelves, random samples should be generated from the library's integrated library system (ILS). If librarians are just accessing the collection for preservation purposes, they can easily count ranges, columns, shelves and books and use Microsoft Excel or other spreadsheet software to create random samples. Misplacement of books on shelves does have associated costs—in the patron's satisfaction with the library's services and in staff time trying to locate missing books. It may be well worth the extra time to figure out how to extract random items from your library's ILS to complete your sample.

=== Management of sampling surveys ===
Once librarians are laying hands on individual books in their sample, what do they look for? They should check the cover of the book for discoloration, peeling, damage. Then they should open the book and look at the pages of the text—are they yellowing, brittle? An archival marking pen may be used to determine whether a book is acidic. How is the binding? Are the pages intact? This data can be recorded in a spreadsheet for use of later analysis of the entire sample. Include the item's call number, place of publication, place of production, publication date, measurements (spine height, cover width, depth of back to front cover, the amount of shelving space surrounding the item, horizontally and vertically); describe the case style, leaf attachment and binding condition, text attachment, acidity, paper strength, and text contrast; list the damaged pages and describe the enclosure type and condition; record any additional notes that will be useful for future reference and analysis.

Costs for sampling 384 random items at the University of Illinois Urbana-Champaign in 1987 were less than $5000. The University of Illinois Urbana-Champaign Library employed eleven graduate students from the school of library and information science, who received training and supervision. Each surveyor collected forty samples, 90% of the surveys were completed on the first day in 5.5 survey hours.

=== Analysis of results ===
Information from samples can easily be recorded in Excel or some other spreadsheet program, where simple analysis can be performed. For preservation purposes, librarians want to know the condition of their collections: what percentage of the books are acidic? What percentage of the collection is damaged? Does more damage take place on cramped shelves? Does the library need to be concerned with books printed in Eastern Europe? Etc. After identifying the issues of primary concern in the collection, preservation measures should be considered. What needs to happen as soon as possible to preserve the collection? What choices can be delayed for some time? Does the library have a preservation plan in its collection management policy? Is there a budget for maintaining the collections? What can be extrapolated from the data about what might happen to the collection in ten to twenty years?

Using the results of the library's collection assessment, budgetary requests can be substantiated by data. The library needs an increase in budget to care for aging collections, or the library needs an increase in funding to add new materials for our students to meet deficiencies and weaknesses. This strategy was employed by the Joyner Library at East Carolina University after an inventory and shelf-analysis project in 2005.

=== Other uses of sampling in library collection management ===
Sampling can also be used to calculate optimum intervals for shelf reading. Average misplacement of books on a shelf in a university library is 5.6%. 65 percent of the books were located on the correct shelf, but not in the right order. Cooper and Wolthausen developed equations indicating that the optimal shelf-reading interval is a function of the number of books in a section, the likelihood that a book in one section will migrate to another, checking and users costs, and the error rate of the shelf reader. Daily shelf reading assignments, another important component of collection maintenance, performed by the Stack Maintenance staff maintain proper shelf order in a library collection. Yet daily shelf reading cannot be considered in lieu of a collection inventory, the manpower expended for shelf reading is invaluable to a library's collection.

For mislabeled items the ability for Stack Maintenance to accurately read shelves, and Interlibrary Loan staff to retrieve items, is crucial. Collections that have not been properly inventoried impact library users beyond the university's walls with unfulfillable interlibrary loan requests. Inventory projects can save money by reducing unnecessary interlibrary loan requests and duplicate purchases. Atkins and Weible (2003) "used interlibrary loan requests to identify problems in locating materials. Not on shelf is a common reason for a cancellation of an interlibrary loan request". Addressing these factors inevitably contributes to increased service quality.
