= Journal of South Texas =

The Journal of South Texas (ISSN 1099-9310) is a biannual peer-reviewed academic journal published for the South Texas Historical Association by Texas A&M University-Kingsville. The editor-in-chief is Alberto Rodriguez (Texas A&M University-Kingsville). It was established in 1974 and covers the history and heritage of greater Texas.
