= Preventive conservation =

Preventive conservation may refer to:

- Collections maintenance
- Conservation and restoration of cultural property
- Preservation (library and archive)
- Risk management (cultural property)
