= Carolyn Harris (librarian) =

American librarian

Carolyn Lynnet Harris (1947 – January 15, 1994) was an American preservation librarian. She received a B.A. in Art History in 1969 and a Masters of Library Science in 1970, both from the University of Texas at Austin.

== Career ==
Harris was educated at the University of Texas at Austin and began her career as a manuscript cataloguer at the University of Texas's Harry Ransom Center, where she worked from 1973 to 1980.

From 1981 to 1987, she was the head of Columbia University Libraries’ Preservation Division After teaching in Columbia University's preservation and conservation library science program, she was named program director in 1990.

When the program closed in 1992, she moved it to the University of Texas at Austin. From 1992 to 1994, she was director and a senior lecturer of the Preservation and Conservation Studies at the Graduate School of Library and Information Science at the University of Texas at Austin.

She published extensively throughout her career and was president of the Resources and Technical Services Division of the American Library Association from 1988 to 1989.

Her writings in the field of conservation and preservation won her the John Brubaker Award from the Catholic Library Association in 1983 and The Rex Dillow Award from CAPPA in 1990.

== Paul Banks and Carolyn Harris Preservation Award ==
The Paul Banks and Carolyn Harris Preservation Award was established to honor Paul N. Banks and Carolyn Harris, early leaders in library preservation by the Association for Library Collections & Technical Services (ALCTS), a division of the American Library Association.

== Death ==
Harris died on January 15, 1994, in Austin, Texas, at the age of 46.

== Works ==
- Harris, C. L. (1979). "Mass deacidification: Science to the rescue?". Library Journal. 104 (13): 1423–1427.
- Harris, Carolyn (March 1982). "Brittle Books: A Way of Life". Catholic Library World. 53: 332–35. Winner of John Brubacker Award
- Bagnall, R. S.; Harris, C. L. (1987). "Involving scholars in preservation decisions: The case of the classicists". Journal of Academic Librarianship. 13 (3): 140–146.
- Harris, C. L. (1986). “Preservation of library materials.” The ALA yearbook of library and information services, 11. Chicago: American Library Association.
- Pilette, Roberta; Harris, Carolyn (1989). "It Takes Two to Tango: A Conservator's View of Curator/Conservator Relations". Rare Books and Manuscripts Librarianship. 4 (2): 103–111.
- Harris, C. L. (1990). “Education for preservation administration: Part 1 -- the role of the conservation education program of Columbia University's school of library service.” Conservation Administration News, (42)8-9, 24.
- Harris, C. L. (1990). Education for preservation administration: Part 2—the role of the conservation education program of Columbia university's school of library service. Conservation Administration News, (43)4-5, 29.
- Harris, C. L. (1990). "Library binder's role in preservation education". New Library Scene. 9: 8–11.
- Harris, C. L. (1991). "The preservation consideration in electronic security systems". Library & Archival Security. 11 (1): 35–42. doi:10.1300/J114v11n01_04.
- Harris, C.; Mandel, C.; Wolven, R. (1991). "A cost model for presentation: The Columbia University libraries' approach". Library Resources and Technical Services. 35 (1): 33–54.
- Harris, C. L. (1991). "The preservation consideration in electronic security systems". Library & Archival Security. 11 (1): 35–42. doi:10.1300/J114v11n01_04.
- Harris, C. L.; et al. (1991). "The Columbia University libraries staff development seminar". The Journal of Academic Librarianship. 17: 71–3.
- Harris, C. L. (1994). "CAN moving to UT-Austin". Conservation Administration News. 56: 1.
- Harris, Carolyn (2000). "Selection for preservation". In Banks, Paul N.; Pilette, Roberta (eds.). Preservation: Issues and Planning. Chicago: American Library Association. pp. 206–224. ISBN 0-8389-0776-8.
