= Weissman Preservation Center =

The Weissman Preservation Center exists to preserve the collections of books, manuscripts, prints, drawings, maps, photographs, and other holdings of Harvard University.
