= Preservation (library and archive) =

Set of activities aimed at prolonging the life of a record or object

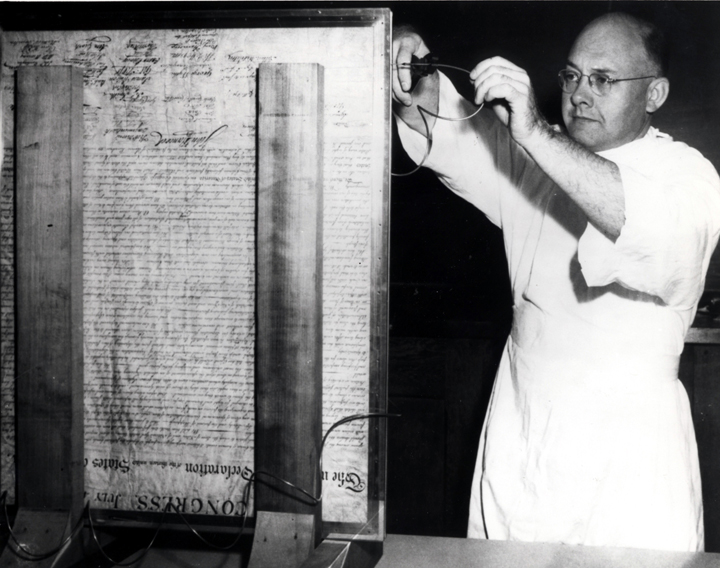
National Bureau of Standards preserving the U.S. Declaration of Independence in 1951

In conservation, library and archival science, preservation is a set of preventive conservation activities aimed at prolonging the life of a record, book, or object while making as few changes as possible. Preservation activities vary widely and may include monitoring the condition of items, maintaining the temperature and humidity in collection storage areas, writing a plan in case of emergencies, digitizing items, writing relevant metadata, and increasing accessibility. Preservation, in this definition, is practiced in a library or an archive by a conservator, librarian, archivist, or other professional when they perceive a collection or record is in need of maintenance.

Preservation should be distinguished from interventive conservation and restoration, which refers to the treatment and repair of individual items to slow the process of decay, or restore them to a usable state. "Preventive conservation" is used interchangeably with "preservation".

== Fundamentals ==
=== Standard functions of preservation programs ===
- Risk management in collections is the preventive care of a collection as a whole.
  - Preservation can include general collections maintenance activities such as security, environmental monitoring, preservation surveys, and more specialized activities such as mass deacidification.
  - Disaster preparedness (RT: Disaster Plan / Business Continuation / Disaster Recovery / Disaster Mitigation Plan) is the practice of arranging for the necessary resources and planning the best course of action to prevent or minimize damage to a collection in the event of a disaster of any level of magnitude, whether natural or human-made.
  - Digital preservation is the maintenance of digitally stored information. Some means of digital preservation include refreshing, migration, replication and emulation. This should not be confused with digitization, which is a process of creating digital information which must then itself be preserved digitally.
  - Reformatting is the practice of creating copies of an object in another type of data-storage device. Reformatting processes include microfilming and digitization.

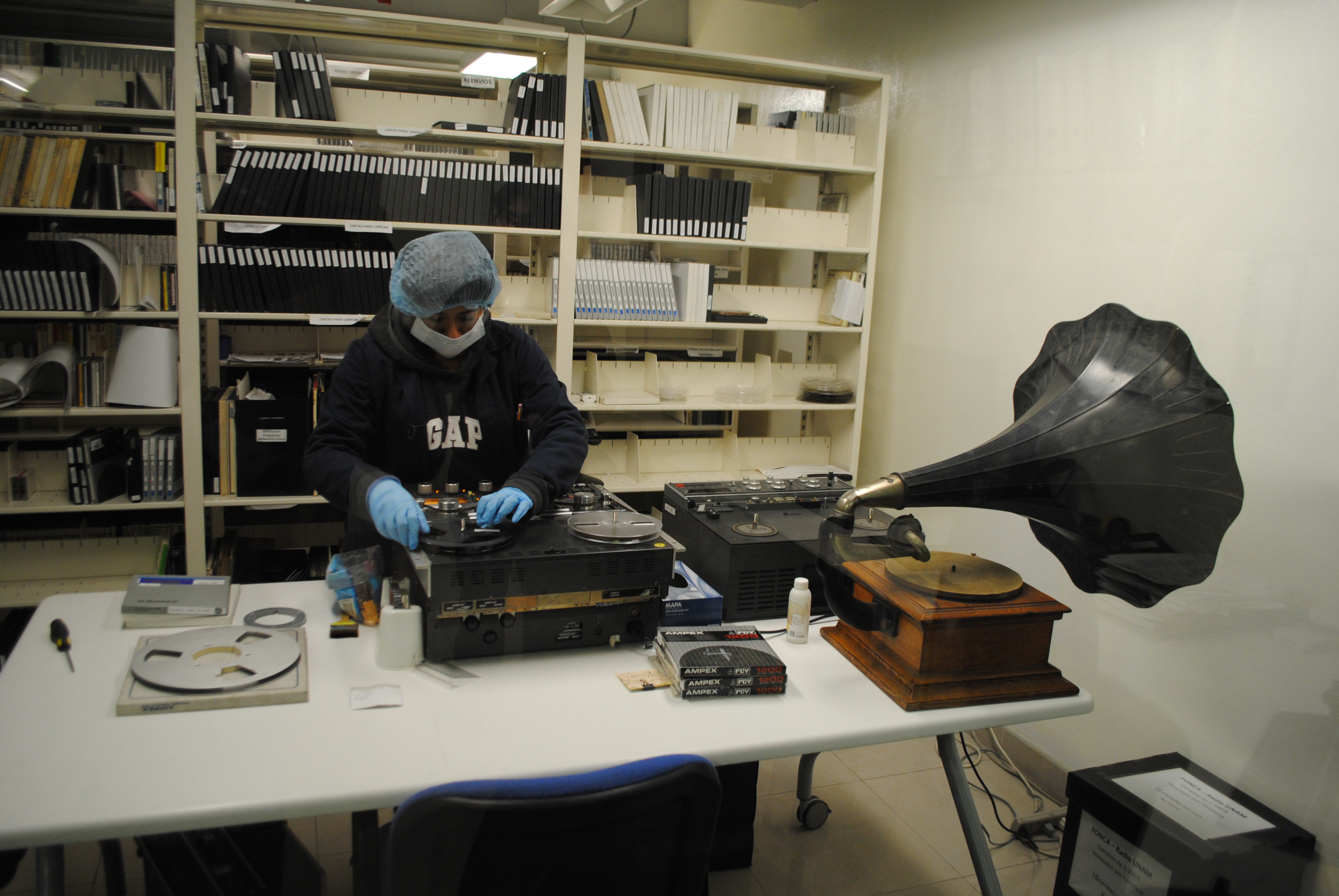
Preservation and recording of magnetic tapes at Fonoteca Nacional (National Sound Archive of Mexico)

=== Media-specific issues and treatments ===
- Books - Sizing and Leather Binding
- Ephemera and Realia
- Paper - Acid-free paper, Japanese tissue, Mummy paper, Paper splitting, and Print permanence
- Parchment - Parchment repair and Preservation of Illuminated Manuscripts
- Moving image - Film preservation and Video recording
- Sound recording - Preservation of magnetic audiotape
- Oral history preservation
- Language Preservation
- Visual material - Color photography § Preservation issues and Architectural reprography, a variety of technologies and media used to make multiple copies of original drawings or records created by architects, engineers, mapmakers and related professionals.
- Optical media preservation
- Ink

=== Digitization ===
A relatively new concept, digitization, has been hailed as a way to preserve historical items for future use. "Digitizing refers to the process of converting analog materials into digital form."

For manuscripts, digitization is achieved through scanning an item and saving it to a digital format. For example, the Google Book Search program has partnered with over forty libraries around the world to digitize books. The goal of this library partnership project is to "make it easier for people to find relevant books – specifically, books they wouldn't find any other way such as those that are out of print – while carefully respecting authors' and publishers' copyrights."

Although digitization seems to be a promising area for future preservation, there are also problems. The main problems are that digital space costs money, media and file formats may become obsolete, and backwards compatibility is not guaranteed. Higher-quality images take a longer time to scan, but are often more valuable for future use. Fragile items are often more difficult or more expensive to scan, which creates a selection problem for preservationists where they must decide if digital access in the future is worth potentially damaging the item during the scanning process. Other problems include scan quality, redundancy of digitized books among different libraries, and copyright law.

However, many of these problems are being solved through educational initiatives. Educational programs are tailoring themselves to fit preservation needs and help new students understand preservation practices. Programs teaching graduate students about digital librarianship are especially important.

Digital Preservation is related to digitization. The main goal of digital preservation is to guarantee that people will have access to the digitally preserved materials long into the future.

Groups such as the Digital Preservation Network strive to ensure that "the complete scholarly record is preserved for future generations". The Library of Congress maintains a Sustainability of Digital Formats web site that educates institutions on various aspects of preservation: most notably, on approximately 200 digital format types and which are most likely to last into the future.

== Practices ==
When practicing preservation, one has several factors to consider in order to properly preserve a record: 1) the storage environment of the record, 2) the criteria to determine when preservation is necessary, 3) what the standard preservation practices are for that particular institution, 4) research and testing, and 5) if any vendor services will be needed for further preservation and potentially conservation.

=== Storage environment ===
Environmental controls are necessary to facilitate the preservation of organic materials and are especially important to monitor in rare and special collections. Key environmental factors to watch include temperature, relative humidity, pests, pollutants, and light exposure.

In general, the lower the temperature is, the better it is for the collection. However, since books and other materials are often housed in areas with people, a compromise must be struck to accommodate human comfort. A reasonable temperature to accomplish both goals is 65–68˚F (18–20 °C). However, if possible, film and photography collections should be kept in a segregated area at 55 ˚F (13 °C).

Books and other materials take up and give off moisture making them sensitive to relative humidity. Very high humidity encourages mold growth and insect infestations. Low humidity causes materials to lose their flexibility. Fluctuations in relative humidity are more damaging than a constant humidity in the middle or low range. Generally, the relative humidity should be between 30 and 50% with as little variation as possible, however recommendations on specific levels to maintain vary depending on the type of material, i.e. paper-based, film, etc. A specialized dew point calculator for book preservation is available.

Pests, such as insects and vermin, eat and destroy paper and the adhesive that secures book bindings. Food and drink in libraries, archives, and museums can increase the attraction of pests. An Integrated Pest Management system is one way to control pests in libraries.

Particulate and gaseous pollutants, such as soot, ozone, sulfur dioxide, oxides of nitrogen, can cause dust, soiling, and irreversible molecular damage to materials. Pollutants are exceedingly small and not easily detectable or removable. A special filtration system in the building's HVAC is a helpful defense.

Exposure to light also has a significant effect on materials. It is not only the light visible to humans that can cause damage, but also ultraviolet light and infrared radiation. Measured in lux or the amount of lumens/m^{2}, the generally accepted level of illumination with sensitive materials is limited to 50 lux per day. Materials receiving more lux than recommended can be placed in dark storage periodically to prolong the original appearance of the object.

Recent concerns about the impact of climate change on the management of cultural heritage objects as well as the historic environment has prompted research efforts to investigate alternative climate control methods and strategies that include the implementation of alternative climate control systems to replace or supplement traditional high-energy consuming HVAC systems as well as the introduction of passive preservation techniques. Rather than maintaining a flat line, consistent 24/7 condition for a collection's environment, fluctuation can occur within acceptable limits to create a preservation environment while also thinking of energy efficiency and taking advantage of the outside environment.

Bound materials are sensitive to rapid temperature or humidity cycling due to differential expansion of the binding and pages, which may cause the binding to crack and/or the pages to warp. Changes in temperature and humidity should be done slowly so as to minimize the difference in expansion rates. However, an accelerated aging study on the effects of fluctuating temperature and humidity on paper color and strength showed no evidence that cycling of one temperature to another or one RH to another caused a different mechanism of decay.

The preferred method for storing manuscripts, archival records, and other paper documents is to place them in acid-free paper folders which are then placed in acid-free of low-lignin boxes for further protection. Similarly, books that are fragile, valuable, oddly shaped, or in need of protection can be stored in archival boxes and enclosures. Additionally, housing books can protect them from many of the contributing factors to book damage: pests, light, temperature changes, and water. Contamination can occur at the time of manufacture, especially with electronic materials. It must be stopped before it spreads, but it is usually irreversible.

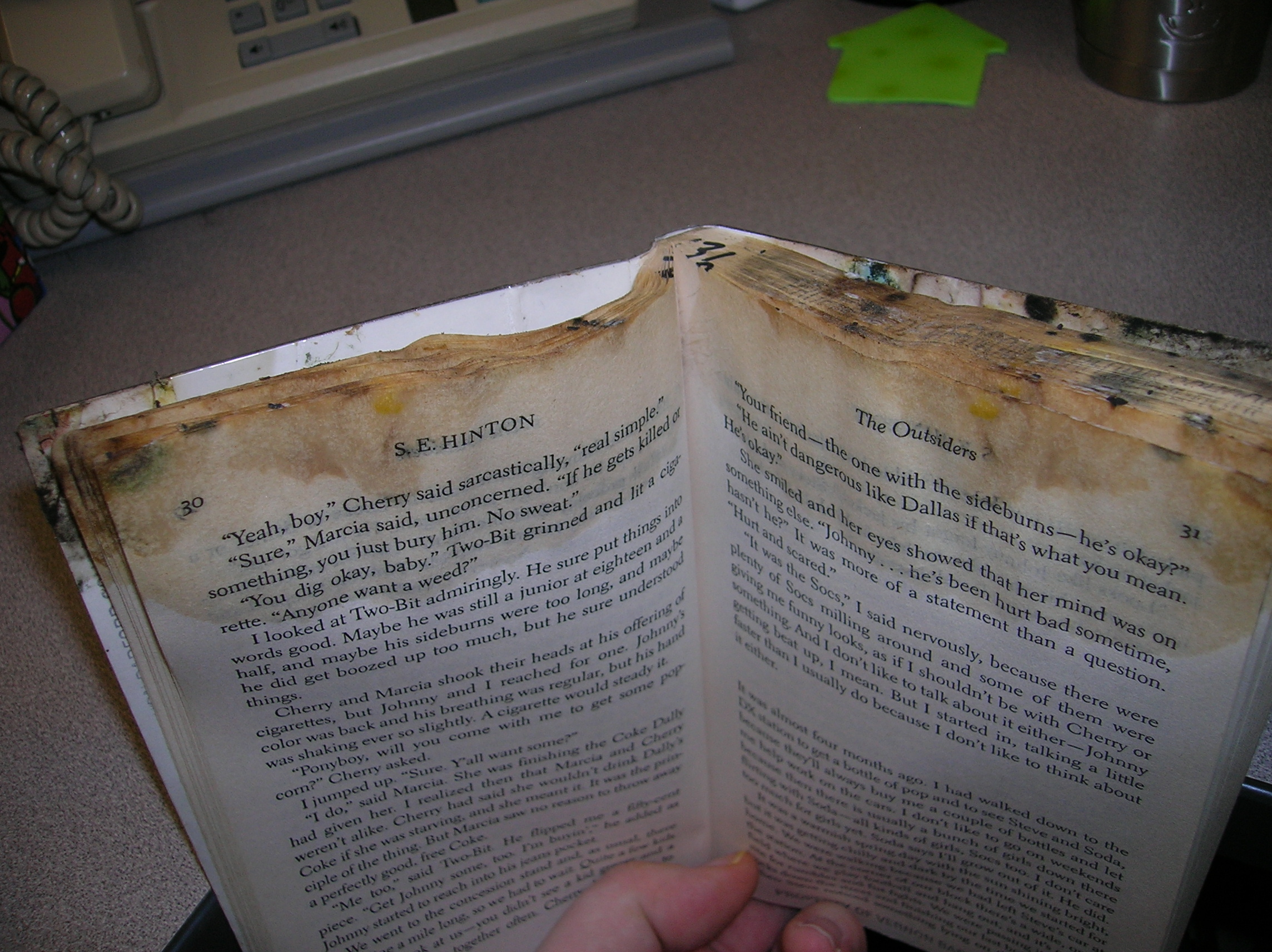
Photo of a book damaged by being inadvertently left for some time in close proximity to a banana in a closed backpack

=== Preservation criteria ===
Making a proper decision is an important factor before starting preservation practices. Decision making for preservation should be made considering significance and value of materials. Significance is considered to have two major components: importance and quality. "Importance" relates to the collection's role as a record, and "quality" covers comprehensiveness, depth, uniqueness, authenticity and reputation of the collection. Moreover, analyzing the significance of materials can be used to uncover more about their meaning. Assessment of significance can also aid in documenting the provenance and context to argue the case for grant funding for the object and collection.

Forms of significance can be historically, culturally, socially, or spiritually significant. In the preservation context, libraries and archives make decisions in different ways. In libraries, decision-making likely targets existing holding materials, whereas in archives, decisions for preservation are often made when they acquire materials. Therefore, different criteria might be needed on different occasions. In general, for archive criteria, the points include:

1. the characteristics of a record (purpose, creator, etc.);
2. the quality of the information in the record;
3. the record in context (part of a series or not);
4. potential use and possible limitations; and
5. the cost against the benefits from its existence.

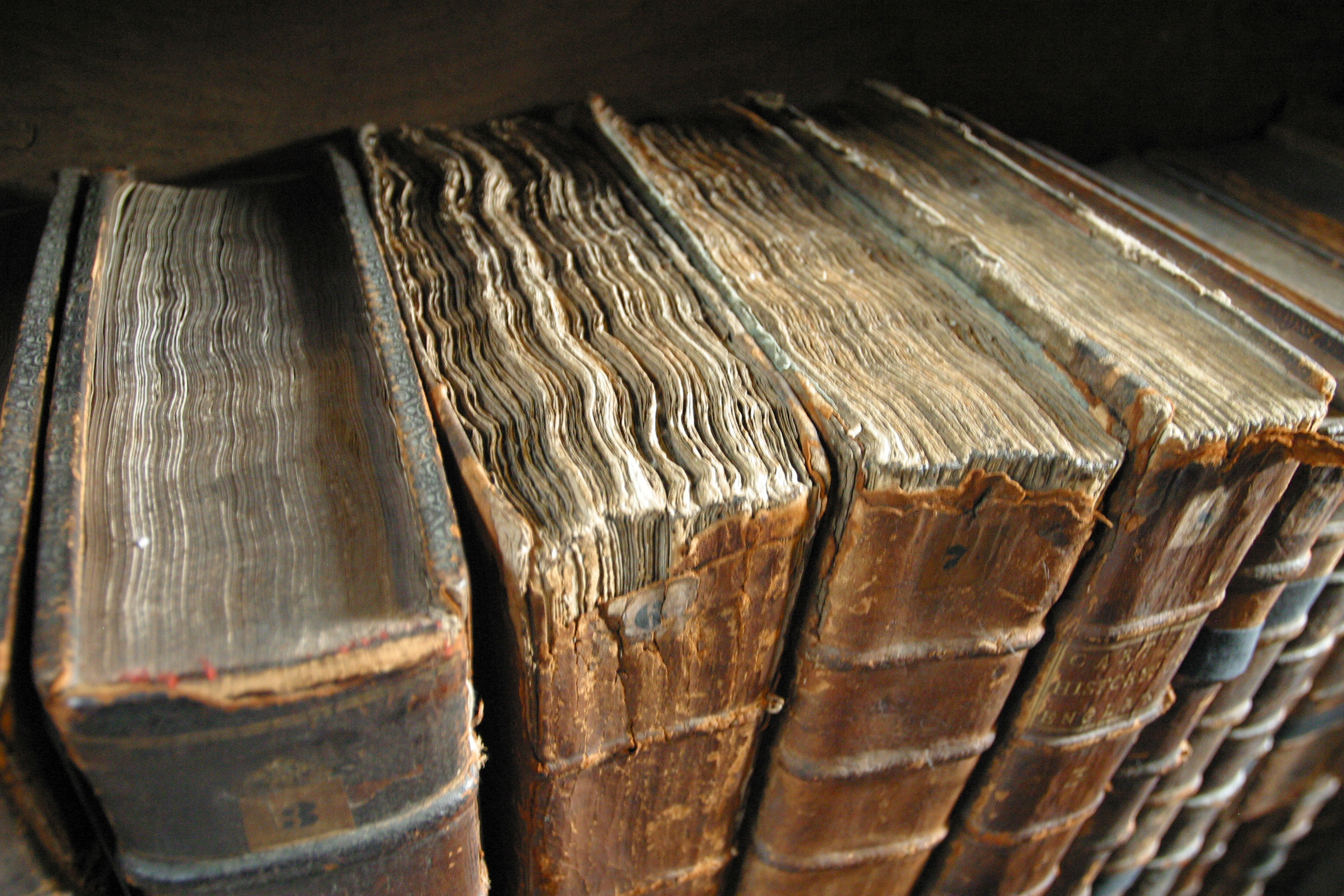
Worn books at the library of Merton College, Oxford

For archival criteria, the following are evidence of significance:

1. uniqueness,
2. irreplaceability,
3. high level of impact – over time or place,
4. high level of influence,
5. representation of a type, and
6. comparative value (rarity, completeness, integrity relative to others of its kind).

=== Standards ===
Since the 1970s, the Northeast Document Conservation Center has stated that the study of understanding the needs of the archive/library is inherently important to their survival. To prolong the life of a collection, it is important that a systematic preservation plan is in place. The first step in planning a preservation program is to assess the institution's existing preservation needs. This process entails identifying the general and specific needs of the collection, establishing priorities, and gathering the resources to execute the plan.

Because budget and time limitations require priorities to be set, standards have been established by the profession to determine what should be preserved in a collection. Considerations include existing condition, rarity, and evidentiary and market values. With non-paper formats, the availability of equipment to access the information will be a factor (for example, playback equipment for audio-visual materials, or microform readers). An institution should determine how many, if any, other institutions hold the material, and consider coordinating efforts with those that do.

Institutions should establish an environment that prioritizes preservation and create an understanding among administration and staff. Additionally, the institution's commitment to preservation should be communicated to funders and stakeholders so that funds can be allocated towards preservation efforts. The first steps an institution should implement, according to the NEDCC, are to establish a policy that defines and charts the course of action and create a framework for carrying out goals and priorities.

There are three methods for carrying out a preservation survey: general preservation assessment, collection condition surveys, and an item-by-item survey. General condition surveys can be part of a library inventory.

Selection for treatment determines the survival of materials and should be done by a specialist, whether in relation to an established collection development policy or on an item by item basis. Once an object or collection has been chosen for preservation, the treatment must be determined that is most appropriate to the material and its collecting institution. If the information is most important, reformatting or creation of a surrogate is a likely option. If the artifact itself is of value, it will receive conservation treatment, ideally of a reversible nature.

=== Research and testing ===
With old media deteriorating or showing their vulnerabilities and new media becoming available, research remains active in the field of conservation and preservation. Everything from how to preserve paper media to creating and maintaining electronic resources and gauging their digital permanence is being explored by students and professionals in archives/libraries. The two main issues that most institutions tend to face are the rapid disintegration of acidic paper and water damage (due to flooding, plumbing problems, etc.). Therefore, these areas of preservation, as well as new digital technologies, receive much of the research attention.

The American Library Association has many scholarly journals that publish articles on preservation topics, such as College and Research Libraries, Information Technology and Libraries, and Library Resources and Technical Services. Scholarly periodicals in this field from other publishers include International Preservation News, Journal of the American Institute for Conservation, and Collection Management among many others.

== Education ==
Learning the proper methods of preservation is important and most archivists are educated on the subject at academic institutions that specifically cover archives and preservation. In the United States most repositories require archivists to have a degree from an ALA-accredited library school. Similar institutions exist in countries outside the US.

Since 2010, the Andrew W. Mellon Foundation has enhanced funding for library and archives conservation education in three major conservation programs. These programs are all part of the Association of North American Graduate Programs in the Conservation of Cultural Property (ANAGPIC).

Another educational resource available to preservationists is the Northeast Document Conservation Center or NEDCC.

The Preservation, Planning and Publications Committee of the Preservation and Reformatting Section (PARS) in the Association for Library Collections & Technical Services has created a Preservation Education Directory of ALA Accredited schools in the U.S. and Canada offering courses in preservation. The directory is updated approximately every three years. The 10th Edition was made available on the ALCTS web site in March 2015.

Additional preservation education is available to librarians through various professional organizations, such as:

- American Institute for Conservation
- American Library Association
- Amigos Library Services Preservation Service
- Association for Information and Image Management (AIIM)
- Association for Recorded Sound Collections (ARSC)
- Association of Moving Image Archivists (AMIA)
- Buffalo State College. Art Conservation Department, Buffalo, New York
- Campbell Center for Historic Preservation Studies, Mount Carroll, Illinois
- Conservation Center for Art and Historic Artifacts in Philadelphia, Pennsylvania
- George Eastman Museum School of Film & Video Preservation Rochester, New York
- International Federation of Film Archives (FIAF) Bologna, Italy
- Kilgarlin Center for Preservation of the Cultural Record
- Library Binding Institute
- Lyrasis
- New York University Institute of Fine Arts Conservation Center, New York, New York
- North Bennet Street School, Boston, Massachusetts
- Northeast Document Conservation Center (NEDCC)
- Queen's University. Master of Art Conservation Program, Ontario, Canada
- Rare Book School (RBS) at the University of Virginia
- Society of American Archivists
- University of Delaware/Winterthur Museum Art Conservation Program, Newark, Delaware
- The National Archives

== Preservation in non-academic facilities ==
=== Public libraries ===
Limited, tax-driven funding can often interfere with the ability for public libraries to engage in extensive preservation activities. Materials, particularly books, are often much easier to replace than to repair when damaged or worn. Public libraries usually try to tailor their services to meet the needs and desires of their local communities, which could cause an emphasis on acquiring new materials over preserving old ones. Librarians working in public facilities frequently have to make complicated decisions about how to best serve their patrons. Commonly, public library systems work with each other and sometimes with more academic libraries through interlibrary loan programs. By sharing resources, they are able to expand upon what might be available to their own patrons and share the burdens of preservation across a greater array of systems.

=== Archival repositories and special collections ===
Archival facilities focus specifically on rare and fragile materials. With staff trained in appropriate techniques, archives are often available to many public and private library facilities as an alternative to destroying older materials. Items that are unique, such as photographs, or items that are out of print, can be preserved in archival facilities more easily than in many library settings.

=== Museums ===
Because so many museum holdings are unique, including print materials, art, and other objects, preservationists are often most active in this setting; however, since most holdings are usually much more fragile, or possibly corrupted, conservation may be more necessary than preservation. This is especially common in art museums. Museums typically hold to the same practices led by archival institutions.

== History ==
=== Antecedents ===
Preservation as a formal profession in libraries and archives dates from the twentieth century, but its philosophy and practice has roots in many earlier traditions.

In many ancient societies, appeals to heavenly protectors were used to preserve books, scrolls and manuscripts from insects, fire and decay.

- To the ancient Egyptians, the scarab or dung beetle (see: Scarab (artifact)) was a protector of written products.
- In ancient Babylon, Nabu is the heavenly patron of books and protector of clay tablets. Nabu is the Babylonian god of wisdom and writing, and is the patron of the scribes, librarians and archivists.
- In Arabic and other eastern societies, sometimes a traditional method to protect books and scrolls was a metaphysical appeal to "Kabi:Kaj", the "King of the Cockroaches".
- There are three saints in the Christian church that are closely associated with libraries as patrons: Saint Lawrence, Saint Jerome, and Catherine of Alexandria.
- In some Christian monasteries, prayers and curses were placed at the end of books to prevent theft, or to damn the thieves. Frequently called a "book curse", these were placed in the book to deter theft.
- Sri Lankan symbols or images of the Sinhalese "Fire Demons" are hung in the corners of libraries and other buildings to appease the incendiary demons and to avert fire, lightning and cataclysm, according to Sinhalese mythology. Since fire and acid decomposition (also known as "slow fires") are a special problem for libraries because of the concentration of paper products, the "Fire Demons" are also included when used to assuage these destroyers of libraries and books.
- The Aztec and Mayan Indians of Latin America also had deities concerned with libraries. The major god, Quetzalcoatl, is credited with the discoveries of the arts, the calendar, and of writing. A single feather or plume at the beginning or at the end of a document or stone carving would indicate a dedication to the "Feathered Serpent". This symbol degenerated over time to a single fringed line.

Human record-keeping arguably dates back to the cave painting boom of the Upper Paleolithic, some 32,000–40,000 years ago. More direct antecedents are the writing systems that developed in the 4th millennium BC. Written record keeping and information sharing practices, along with oral tradition, sustain and transmit information from one group to another. This level of preservation has been supplemented over the last century with the professional practice of preservation and conservation in the cultural heritage community.

1. Oral tradition or oral culture, the transmission of information from one generation to the next without a writing system.
2. Antiquarian practices, including scribal practice, burial practice, the libraries at Pergamum, Alexandria and other ancient archives.
3. Medieval practices, including the scriptorium and relic collection
4. Renaissance and the changing conception of artists and works of art
5. Enlightenment and the Encyclopedists
6. Romantic movement's imperative to preserve

=== Significant events ===
- 1933: William Barrow introduces the field of conservation to paper deacidification when he publishes a paper on the acid paper problem. In later studies, Barrow tested paper from American books made between 1900 and 1949, and learned that after forty years the books had lost on average 96 percent of their original strength; after less than ten years, they had already lost 64 percent. Barrow determined that this rapid deterioration was not the direct result of using wood-pulp fibers, since rag papers of this period were also aging rapidly, but rather due to the residual sulfuric acid produced in both rag and wood pulp papers. Earlier papermaking methods left the final product only mildly alkaline or even neutral and such paper has maintained its strength for 300 to 800 years, despite sulfur dioxide and other air pollutants. The manufacturing methods used after 1870, however, employed sulfuric acid for sizing and bleaching the paper, which would eventually lead to yellowing, brittle paper. Barrow's 1933 article on the fragile state of wood pulp paper predicted the life expectancy, or "LE", of this paper was approximately 40–50 years. At that point the paper would begin to show signs of natural decay, and he concluded that research for a new media on which to write and print was needed.
- 1966: The Flood of the River Arno in Florence, Italy, damaged or destroyed millions of rare books and led to the development of restoration laboratories and new methods in conservation. Instrumental in this process was conservationist Peter Waters, who led a group of volunteers, called "mud angels", in restoring thousands of books and papers. This event awakened many historians, librarians, and other professionals to the importance of having a preservation plan. Many consider this flood to be one of the worst disasters since the burning of the Library of Alexandria. It spurred a resurgence in the profession of preservation and conservation worldwide, including the addition of a Preservation Office at the Library of Congress.
- 1987: Terry Saunders releases the film Slow Fires: On the Preservation of the Human Record which examines paper embrittlement resulting from acid decay
- 1989: March 7 ["Commitment Day"] Major US print publishers convene at NYPL to endorse a community-wide commitment to utilizing ISO 9706 certified permanent durable paper in order to combat the acid paper epidemic.

=== Significant people ===
- William Barrow (1904–1967) was an American chemist and paper conservator, and a pioneer of library and archives conservation. He introduced the field of conservation to paper deacidification through alkalization.
- Paul N. Banks (1934–2000) was Conservator and Head of the Conservation Department at the Newberry Library from 1964 to 1981, and published regularly on bookbinding, book and paper conservation, and problems related to conservation. He designed and implemented a curriculum for the Columbia University School of Library Service that dealt directly with preservation training.
- Pamela Darling, author and historian, was Preservation Specialist for the Association of Research Libraries. Her works include materials to aid libraries in establishing their own comprehensive preservation programs.
- Carolyn Harris worked as head of Columbia University Libraries' Preservation Division from 1981 until 1987, where she worked closely with Paul Banks. She published extensive research throughout her career, especially dealing with mass deacidification of wood-pulp paper.
- Carolyn Price Horton (1909–2001), American conservator-restorer of books at the American Philosophical Society and Yale University. Helped museums and libraries in Florence recover books damaged from the 1966 flood of the Arno and the 1972 flood of the Corning Museum of Glass
- Peter Waters, former Conservation Officer at the Library of Congress in Washington, DC, worked in the areas of disaster recovery and preparedness, and the salvaging of water-damaged paper goods.
- Nicholson Baker is a contemporary American novelist and author of Double Fold, a criticism of libraries' destruction of paper-based media.
- Patricia Battin, as the first president of the Commission on Preservation and Access, worked to organize a national campaign both for the use of alkaline paper in publishing companies and for a national program of preservation microfilming.
- John F. Dean, Preservation and Conservation Librarian at Cornell University, has made contributions towards improving preservation efforts in developing countries. Specifically, Dean has created online tutorials for library conservation and preservation in Southeast Asia and Iraq and the Middle East.

The Paul Banks and Carolyn Harris Preservation Award for outstanding preservation specialists in library and archival science, is given annually by the Association for Library Collections & Technical Services, a subdivision of the American Library Association. It is awarded in recognition of professional preservation specialists who have made significant contributions to the field.

== Legal and ethical issues ==
Reformatting, or in any other way copying an item's contents, raises obvious copyright issues. In many cases, a library is allowed to make a limited number of copies of an item for preservation purposes. In the United States, certain exceptions have been made for libraries and archives.

Ethics will play an important role in many aspects of the conservator's activities. When choosing which objects are in need of treatment, the conservator should do what is best for the object in question and not yield to pressure or opinion from outside sources. Conservators should refer to the AIC Code of Ethics and Guidelines for Practice, which states that the conservation professional must "strive to attain the highest possible standards in all aspects of conservation."

One instance in which these decisions may get tricky is when the conservator is dealing with cultural objects. The AIC Code of Ethics and Guidelines for Practice has addressed such concerns, stating "All actions of the conservation professional must be governed by an informed respect for cultural property, its unique character and significance and the people or person who created it." This can be applied in both the care and long-term storage of objects in archives and institutions.

It is important that preservation specialists be respectful of cultural property and the societies that created it, and it is also important for them to be aware of international and national laws pertaining to stolen items. In recent years there has been a rise in nations seeking out artifacts that have been stolen and are now in museums. In many cases museums are working with the nations to find a compromise to balance the need for reliable supervision as well as access for both the public and researchers.

Conservators are not just bound by ethics to treat cultural and religious objects with respect, but also in some cases by law. For example, in the United States, conservators must comply with the Native American Graves Protection and Repatriation Act (NAGPRA). The First Archivists Circle, a group of Native American archivists, has also created Protocols for Native American Archival Materials. The non-binding guidelines are suggestions for libraries and archives with Native American archival materials.

The care of cultural and sacred objects often affects the physical storage or the object. For example, sacred objects of the native peoples of the Western United States are supposed to be stored with sage to ensure their spiritual well-being. The idea of storing an object with plant material is inherently problematic to an archival collection because of the possibility of insect infestation. When conservators have faced this problem, they have addressed it by using freeze-dried sage, thereby meeting both conservation and cultural needs.

Some individuals in the archival community have explored the possible moral responsibility to preserve all cultural phenomena, in regards to the concept of monumental preservation. Other advocates argue that such an undertaking is something that the indigenous or native communities that produce such cultural objects are better suited to perform. Currently, however, many indigenous communities are not financially able to support their own archives and museums. Still, indigenous archives are on the rise in the United States.

== Criticism and reception ==
There is a longstanding tension between preservation of and access to library materials, particularly in the area of special collections. Handling materials promotes their progression to an unusable state, especially if they are handled carelessly. On the other hand, materials must be used in order to gain any benefit from them. In a collection with valuable materials, this conflict is often resolved by a number of measures which can include heightened security, requiring the use of gloves for photographs, restricting the materials researchers may bring with them into a reading room, and restricting use of materials to patrons who are not able to satisfy their research needs with less valuable copies of an item. These restrictions can be considered hindrances to researchers who feel that these measures are in place solely to keep materials out of the hands of the public.

There is also controversy surrounding preservation methods. A major controversy at the end of the twentieth century centered on the practice of discarding items that had been microfilmed. This was the subject of novelist Nicholson Baker's book Double Fold, which chronicled his efforts to save many old runs of American newspapers (formerly owned by the British Library) from being sold to dealers or pulped. A similar concern persists over the retention of original documents reformatted by any means, analog or digital. Concerns include scholarly needs and legal requirements for authentic or original records as well as questions about the longevity, quality, and completeness of reformatted materials. Retention of originals as a source or fail-safe copy is now a fairly common practice. Another controversy revolving around different preservation methods is that of digitization of original material to maintain the intellectual content of the material while ignoring the physical nature of the book. Further, the Modern Language Association's Committee on the Future of the Print Record structured its "Statement on the Significance of Primary Records" on the inherent theoretical ideology that there is a need to preserve as many copies of a printed edition as is possible as texts and their textual settings are, quite simply, not separable, just as the artifactual characteristics of texts are as relevant and varied as the texts themselves (in the report mentioned herewith, G. Thomas Tanselle suggests that presently existing book stacks need not be abandoned with emerging technologies; rather they serve as vitally important original (primary) sources for future study).

Many digitized items, such as back issues of periodicals, are provided by publishers and databases on a subscription basis. If these companies were to cease providing access to their digital information, facilities that elected to discard paper copies of these periodicals could face significant difficulties in providing access to these items. Discussion as to the best ways to utilize digital technologies is therefore ongoing, and the practice continues to evolve. Of course, the issues surrounding digital objects and their care in libraries and archives continues to expand as more and more of contemporary culture is created, stored, and used digitally. These born-digital materials raise their own new kinds of preservation challenges and in some cases they may even require use new kinds of tools and techniques.

=== The library as a sacred institution ===
In her book Sacred Stacks: The Higher Purpose of Libraries and Librarianship, Nancy Kalikow Maxwell discusses how libraries are capable of performing some of the same functions as religion. Many librarians feel that their work is done for some higher purpose. The same can be said for preservation librarians. One instance of the library's role as sacred is to provide a sense of immortality: with the ever-changing world outside, the library will remain stable and dependable. Preservation is a great help in this regard. Through digitization and reformatting, preservation librarians are able to retain material while at the same time adapting to new methods. In this way, libraries can adapt to the changes in user needs without changing the quality of the material itself. Through preservation efforts, patrons can rest assured that although materials are constantly deteriorating over time, the library itself will remain a stable, reliable environment for their information needs. Another sacred ability of the library is to provide information and a connection to the past. By working to slow down the processes of deterioration and decay of library materials, preservation practices help keep this link to the past alive.

== See also ==
- Archaeological site
- Architectural conservation
- Archival science
- Art conservation and restoration
- Digital artifactual value
- Disaster recovery plan
- Hand-colouring of photographs
- Historic preservation
- History of public library advocacy
- Integrated Pest Management
- Library and information science
- Library binding
- Library management
- Museology
- Public library advocacy
- Quipu
- Tribal Historic Preservation Officer
- Video game preservation
- Wood-pulp paper

== Publications ==
- Cloonan, M. V. (Ed.). (2015). Preserving our heritage: perspectives from antiquity to the digital age. Neal-Schuman.
