= Sticky-shed syndrome =

Mode of magnetic tape deterioration

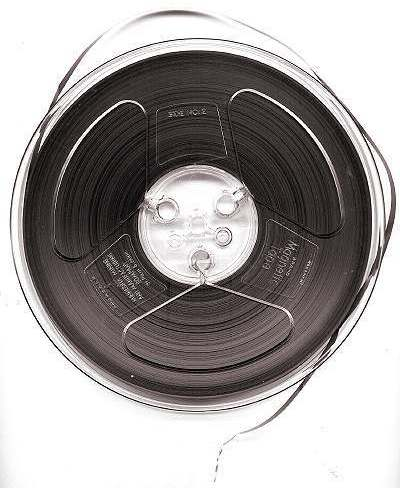
Reel of magnetic audiotape

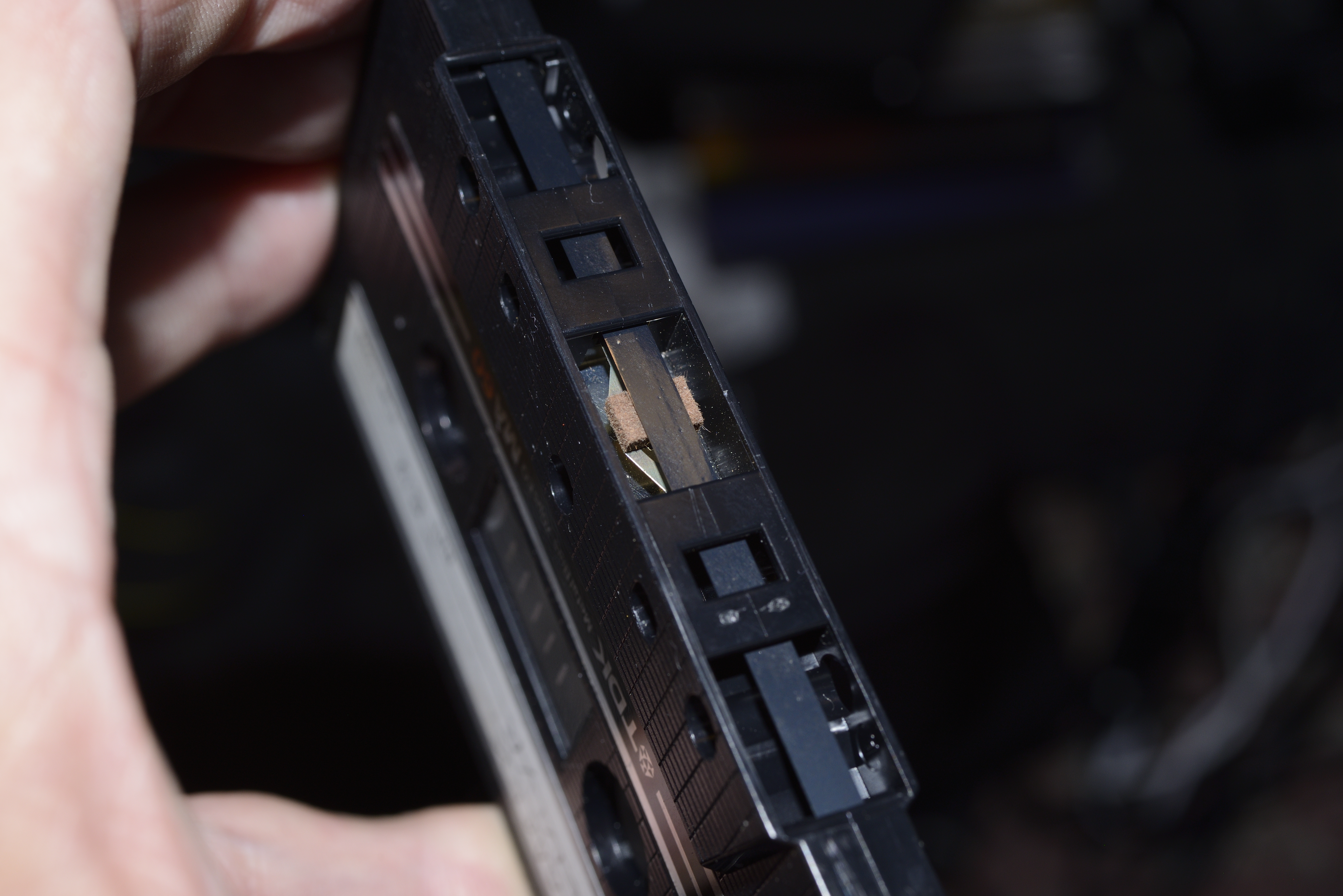
A damaged cassette tape

Sticky-shed syndrome is a condition created by the deterioration of the binders in a magnetic tape, which hold the ferric oxide magnetizable coating to its plastic carrier, or which hold the thinner back-coating on the outside of the tape. This deterioration renders the tape unusable. Some kinds of binder are known to break down over time, due to the absorption of moisture (hydrolysis).

The symptoms of this breakdown can be immediately obvious even when rewinding the tape: tearing sounds and sluggish behavior. If a tape with sticky-shed syndrome is played, the reels will make screeching or squeaking sounds, and the tape will leave dusty, rusty particles on the guides and heads. In some cases, particularly with digital tapes, the symptoms are more subtle, causing intermittent dropouts.

== Cause ==
Some tapes may deteriorate because of a breakdown in the binder (the glue) that holds the oxide particles on the tape, or the back coating on the reverse side, if the tape was from any of the tape manufacturers who had inadvertently used an unstable binder formulation. That binder contained polyurethane that soaks up water (hydrolysis) and causes the urethane to rise to the tape's surface. This problem became known as the 'sticky-shed syndrome'. One explanation offered was that short strands of urethane were commonly used in tapes until it was discovered that mid-sized strands are better and were good at absorbing moisture. Baking the tape at low temperature may temporarily restore the tape by driving the water molecules from the binder so that it can be safely copied to another tape or a different format. After baking, the tape may remain in good condition for approximately a month. If the tape re-deteriorates, it may be possible to bake the tape again.

== Affected stock ==
Tapes affected by sticky-shed are those that were made by Ampex/Quantegy such as 406/407, 456/457, 499, and consumer/audiophile grade back coated tapes such as Grand Master and 20-20+, as well as those made by Scotch/3M including professional tapes such as 206/207, 226/227, 262 (though not all 262 is backcoated and therefore isn't affected), 808, and 986 as well as audiophile tapes such as "Classic" and "Master-XS".

Though less common, many Sony-branded tapes such as PR-150, SLH, ULH, and FeCr have also been reported to suffer from sticky-shed.

Blank cassettes from the 70s–90s are unaffected because the hygroscopic binder was not used in cassette formulations. However, some cassette tape formulations do suffer from a similar problem caused by fatty acids working to the surface of the tape that can cause sticking to heads and guides and severe modulation of signals through the playback head until it is cleaned.

Ampex-branded U-matic cassette tapes are also now exhibiting sticky-shed problems, similar to their reel tape media.

As of the 2020s, digitizing companies have documented examples of sticky-shed from Maxell. TDK has been showing signs as of late of shedding its lubricant in the form of a white powder or white/yellowish goo. This has shown up on the TDK SA and some LX and BX tapes.https://heirloom.cloud/blogs/blog/sticky-shed-syndrome-the-silent-killer-of-vhs-and-8mm-tapes There have been a few reports of some tape from the current manufacturers ATR and RMGI exhibiting symptoms of sticky-shed. But these may be isolated incidents relating to prototype or single bad batches and are not necessarily indicative of the overall product line integrity.

BASF tape production did not use the unstable formulation, and their tape production rarely shows this type of coating instability, although BASF LH Super SM cassettes manufactured in the mid-70s are prone to the problem. Certain batches of Chromdioxid Extra II C-90s, produced around 1989–1991 and sold in the UK, shed a white powder that would coat the record/playback head after a few months of use. The slightly higher performance Chromdioxid Super II and Chromdioxid Maxima C-90 cassettes were unaffected.

As of 2015, some 35 mm magnetic fullcoat tapes produced by Kodak, such as those used for the audio portion of older IMAX films, are also reported to be exhibiting sticky-shed. As tapes remain in storage for a longer time, it is possible that other binder formulations may develop problems.

In some Canadian Disney VHS tapes the Sticky-Shed Syndrome was noticed. These were published between late 1991 and mid 1992/ They will not rewind or fast forward and cause a squeaking noise when playing.

== Solutions ==
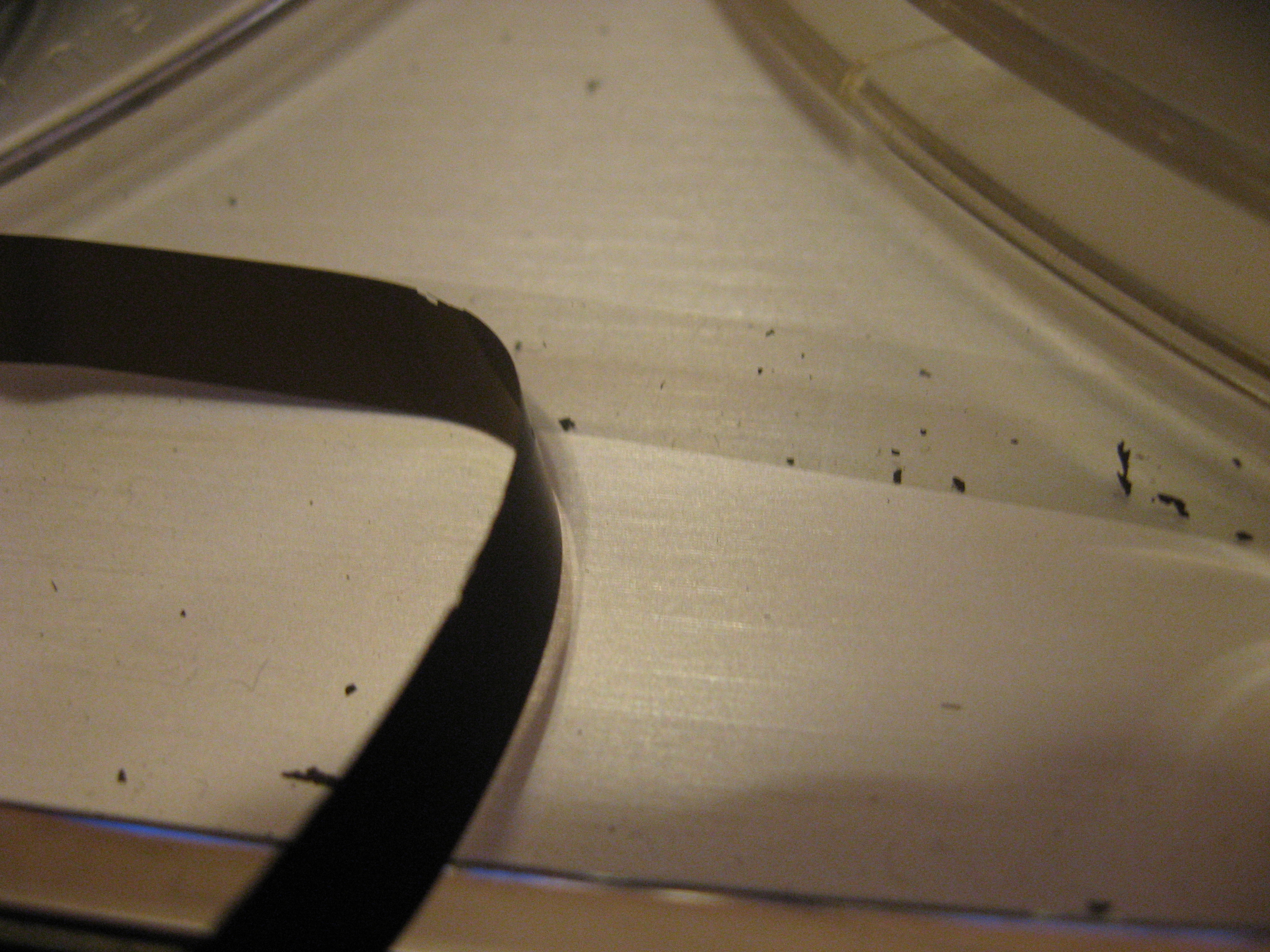
The binder on this tape has deteriorated to the extent that the dark brown oxide layer, which holds the magnetic information, has come away from the clear polyester base, rendering the information unrecoverable.

Current solutions to sticky-shed syndrome seek to safely remove the unwanted moisture from the tape binder. Two different strategies are commonly employed: applying heat to the tape (commonly called 'baking'), and changing the environment to lower the humidity. Baking is widely practiced but can damage tapes if not done properly. While modification of humidity by safely controlling the environment may take significantly longer, its major benefit is that it does not irreparably damage the tape.

=== Baking ===
Baking is a common practice for temporarily repairing sticky-shed syndrome. There is no standard equipment or practice for baking, so each engineer is left to create their own methods and materials. Generally, tapes are baked at low temperatures for relatively long periods of time, such as 130 to 140 °F (54 to 60 °C) for 1 to 8 hours. Tapes wider than 1/4 inch (0.635 cm) may take longer. It is commonly thought that baking a tape will temporarily remove the moisture that has accumulated in the binder. A treated tape will reportedly function like new for a few weeks to a few months before it will reabsorb moisture and be unplayable again.

Baking cannot be used with acetate tapes, nor is it needed.

Baking is not helpful for the removal of mould from tapes, which is a very different issue. Mould may "glue" the tape together on the spools, causing snapping if an attempt is made to play or wind the tape. Even if the tape does not snap, mould can cause head clogging and so be mistaken for sticky-shed syndrome. Further it is possible that a tape may exhibit both mould and sticky-shed syndrome.

==== Necessity ====
Tape baking should only be done when necessary, since there is a risk of damaging the tape from the heat. However, there are some important signs that show when a tape needs baking. The signs include flakes and sticky goo on the tape heads or transport machinery. The usual symptom is squealing when the tape passes the playback head or other fixed parts of a tape player. The squealing is audible directly from the tape and usually also transmitted electronically through the output of the tape recorder as a wideband distortion of the playback signal. Continuous use of a shedding tape permanently damages it, as oxide is literally torn off the tape. This flaking residue can be seen and can feel gummy while still on the tape's surface. There is also a risk of damage to the player. Another symptom is the tape sounding dull and distorted. In a video recording, degradation can be represented by audio-visual dropouts.

== See also ==
- Disc rot
- The Disintegration Loops
