= List of newspaper archives =

Archives of newspapers are held in many libraries, either in the original format, on microfilm or other physical formats. Digital archives of newspapers, some searchable via the internet, also now exist. Archives listed here specialise in or have notable collections of newspapers.

== List of archives ==
Archive	Organisation	Geographic scope	Temporal scope	Format	Notes
Archivo General de la Nación de República Dominicana	Agency of the Government of the Dominican Republic	Dominican Republic	? to present	?	Part of Ministry of Culture (Dominican Republic) until 2008.
BAnQ numérique	Bibliothèque et Archives nationales du Québec	Canada: Quebec	?	Online	
Brazilian Digital Library	Biblioteca National de Brasil	Brazil	1811-present	Online	
British Newspaper Archive	A collaboration between the British Library and Brightsolid	United Kingdom and Ireland	17th century onwards	Physical and online	
California Digital Newspaper Collection	Center for Bibliographical Studies and Research (CBSR) at the University of California Riverside	United States: California	1840s onwards	Online	
Chronicling America	A partnership between the Library of Congress and the National Endowment for the Humanities.	United States and territories	1690–1963	Online	Part of the National Digital Newspaper Program
Delpher	Royal Library of the Netherlands	Netherlands	1618–2005	Online	
Digital Library of the Caribbean	Digital Library of the Caribbean	International		Online	
e-newspaperarchives.ch	Swiss National Library	Switzerland	1692–present	Online	
Florida Digital Newspaper Library	University of Florida Digital Collections	United states: Florida	?	Online	
GenealogyBank	NewsBank	United States	1690–present	Online	
Google News Archive	Google	Worldwide	?	Online	Purchased PaperofRecord.com in 2006
Historic Cambridge Newspaper Collection	Cambridge Public Library	United States: Massachusetts (Cambridge)	1846-1923	Online	
Historic Oregon Newspapers	University of Oregon Libraries	United States: Oregon	1846 onwards	Online	
Illinois Newspaper Project	University of Illinois at Urbana–Champaign	United States: Illinois	1840s onwards	Microfilm and digital	
Internet Archive "Newspapers" collection	Internet Archive	Worldwide	1728 onwards	Online	
Irish Newspaper Archives	Irish Newspaper Archives	Ireland	1738 onwards	Online	
Korean Newspaper Archive	National Library of Korea	Korea	1883–1960s	Physical and online	
National Digital Newspaper Program	Partnership between the National Endowment for the Humanities and the Library of Congress	United States	1836–1922	Online	Companion to the United States Newspaper Program
NewspaperArchive	Heritage Microfilm, Inc.	Worldwide (18 countries and territories available as of 2015)	18th century onwards	Online, microfilm	Claims to be the world's largest archive of newspapers
NewspaperSG	National Library Board and Singapore Press Holdings	Singapore	19th century onwards	Online	
Newspapers.com	Ancestry.com	Worldwide (10 countries available as of 2024)	1607 onwards	Online	
PaperofRecord.com	Cold North Wind, Inc.	Worldwide (14 countries listed on website)	18th century onwards	Online	Sold to Google in 2006
Papers Past	National Library of New Zealand	New Zealand	?	Online	
RetroNews	Bibliothèque nationale de France	France	1631–1951	Online	
Scriptorium	Cantonal and University Library of Lausanne	Switzerland: Vaud	?	Online	
Texas Digital Newspaper Program	University of North Texas	United States: Texas	1728 onwards	Online	
Trove	National Library of Australia	Australia	1803–1957 (The Canberra Times 1926–1995)	Online	Digital copies of the National Library of Australia's microfilm archives
United States Newspaper Program	Partnership between the National Endowment for the Humanities and the Library of Congress	United States and territories	? to present	Microfilm	

== See also ==
- List of archives
- Newspaper digitization
