= Illinois Newspaper Project =

American newspaper archive

- Industry: Library and Information Science
- Founded: April, 1987
- Founder: United States Newspaper Program
- Headquarters: Urbana-Champaign, United States
- Services: Cataloging and preserving Illinois Newspapers
- Website: www.library.illinois.edu/inp/

The Illinois Newspaper Project (INP) began as part of the United States Newspaper Program (USNP), a cooperative effort between the states and the federal government designed to catalog and preserve on microfilm the nation's historic newspaper heritage. The USNP was funded by the National Endowment for the Humanities (NEH) and administered by the Library of Congress, which is currently funding the National Digital Newspaper Program (NDNP), of which the INP is also a part.

Since its establishment in 1987, the INP has been staffed by librarians from the Illinois State Historical Library (ISHL), the Chicago Historical Society (CHS), and the University of Illinois at Urbana–Champaign (UIUC) Library, respectively. The ISHL, now the Abraham Lincoln Presidential Library (ALPL), participated from 1987 to 1995. The CHS, now the Chicago History Museum (CHM), worked on the project from 1989 to 2009 in the 19 northernmost Illinois counties. When the UIUC Library joined the project in June 1995 (and the INP relocated its offices there), it became responsible for the central and southern Illinois counties.

== History ==
=== April 1987 – May 1995 ===
The Illinois State Historical Library was the first Illinois institution to participate in the USNP, and received a planning grant from the National Endowment for the Humanities to develop a survey to assess the state's newspaper collections. ISHL staff sent more than 4,000 surveys to libraries, newspaper publishers, historical societies, genealogical organizations, and anyone whom they learned might own newspapers.

With the planning phase completed in March 1989, the Illinois Newspaper Project team received another grant from NEH to undertake the cataloging and inventorying work (or, "fieldwork"), with technical assistance provided by the Library of Congress. The INP began inventorying and cataloging the newspaper collections at the ISHL in Springfield, Illinois and at the Chicago Historical Society in Chicago. This work took the INP six years to complete.

=== June 1995 – January 1996 ===
After the fieldwork on the collections at ISHL and CHS was completed, the INP relocated its office to the University of Illinois at Urbana-Champaign Library in Urbana, Illinois. Staff at CHS continued inventorying and cataloging other collections in northeast Illinois, and the UIUC-based staff began inventorying and cataloging the newspaper collections at UIUC. INP staff completed work on the collection at UIUC in three years. When this was completed, they began fieldwork in east central Illinois.

=== July 1999 – December 2007 ===
INP staff at UIUC completed fieldwork in east central Illinois, and by 2005, the Midwestern region of Illinois was also completed. The CHS team took responsibility for inventorying and cataloging newspaper collections found in the northwest part of the state.

By the end of 2007, UIUC INP staff had completed the southernmost region of the state, and also began preservation microfilming of unique Illinois newspapers from the UIUC Library collections and other institutions in the state. Staff at the Chicago History Museum (formerly the Chicago Historical Society) completed fieldwork in northeastern Illinois.

=== January 2008 – June 2009 ===
INP staff at UIUC completed fieldwork in southeast Illinois. The staff at CHM completed fieldwork in northwest Illinois, closing their project in April 2009. With the completion of fieldwork in downstate Illinois, the staff at UIUC began the task of re-inventorying the newspaper microfilm collection at the Abraham Lincoln Presidential Library in Springfield, and also continued preservation microfilming of unique Illinois newspapers.

In June 2009, UIUC Library received funding under the National Endowment for the Humanities' National Digital Newspaper Program to digitize culturally significant Illinois newspapers. Titles digitized as part of this program are hosted on the Library of Congress' Chronicling America website.

=== July 2009 – August 31, 2015 ===
The Illinois Newspaper Project, as part of the USNP, completed work in July 2010. To date, INP staff has inventoried and cataloged 21,000+ U.S. newspaper titles, added 26,000+ holdings records to the newspaper union list in OCLC, and microfilmed almost 2,250,000 pages, becoming an important resource for scholars, genealogists, and ancestry enthusiasts. In 2010, the INP exhausted its grant funding for preservation microfilming of unique Illinois newspaper titles, having preserved on microfilm almost 500 titles.

In July 2013, the INP received funding under the NEH to continue digitizing culturally significant Illinois newspapers until August 31, 2015.

=== September 2015 – 2021 ===
According to their website, they were under budget for funds they received in 2013 and were allowed an extension to reallocate the additional funds to a new project that focused on digitizing non-English language newspapers, which consisted of 9,112 pages. An additional grant in 2016, provided further funding. The aim was to prioritize titles published by and for immigrant communities in Chicago, including the world's oldest continuously published Lithuanian paper, Draugas.103,730 pages were digitized.

In 2018, they received a grant to digitize papers from diverse communities, such as African-American, European immigrant and non-mainstream religious and political groups. Examples include Illinois Staats-Zeitung, Daily Worker and the African-American paper Chicago Whip. Due to the COVID-19 pandemic, the grant was extended and concluded September 2021. The finished project consisted of 37 newspaper titles and 91,308 pages.

=== September 2022 – November 2025 ===
The INP received a grant from the National Endowment for the Humanities to digitize 100,000 pages. In 2023, the INP asked for public input on which titles to include and in December of 2023 the advisory board announced their selections.

In November 2025, INP announced the completion of the National Digital Newspaper Program that began in 2022. It included 10,879 issues and 100,848 pages

== List of newspapers digitized by the INP ==
- The Broad Ax (1895–1922)
- The Cairo Bulletin (1868–1915)
- Cairo Evening Times (1865)
- Chicago Eagle (1889–1920)
- The Day Book (1911–1917)
- Juliet Signal (1846–1864)
- The Ottawa Free Trader (1840–1890)
- The Rock Island Argus (1862–1922)

== See also ==
- Digitized Illinois newspapers
