= James P. Hagerstrom =

American flying ace (1921–1994)

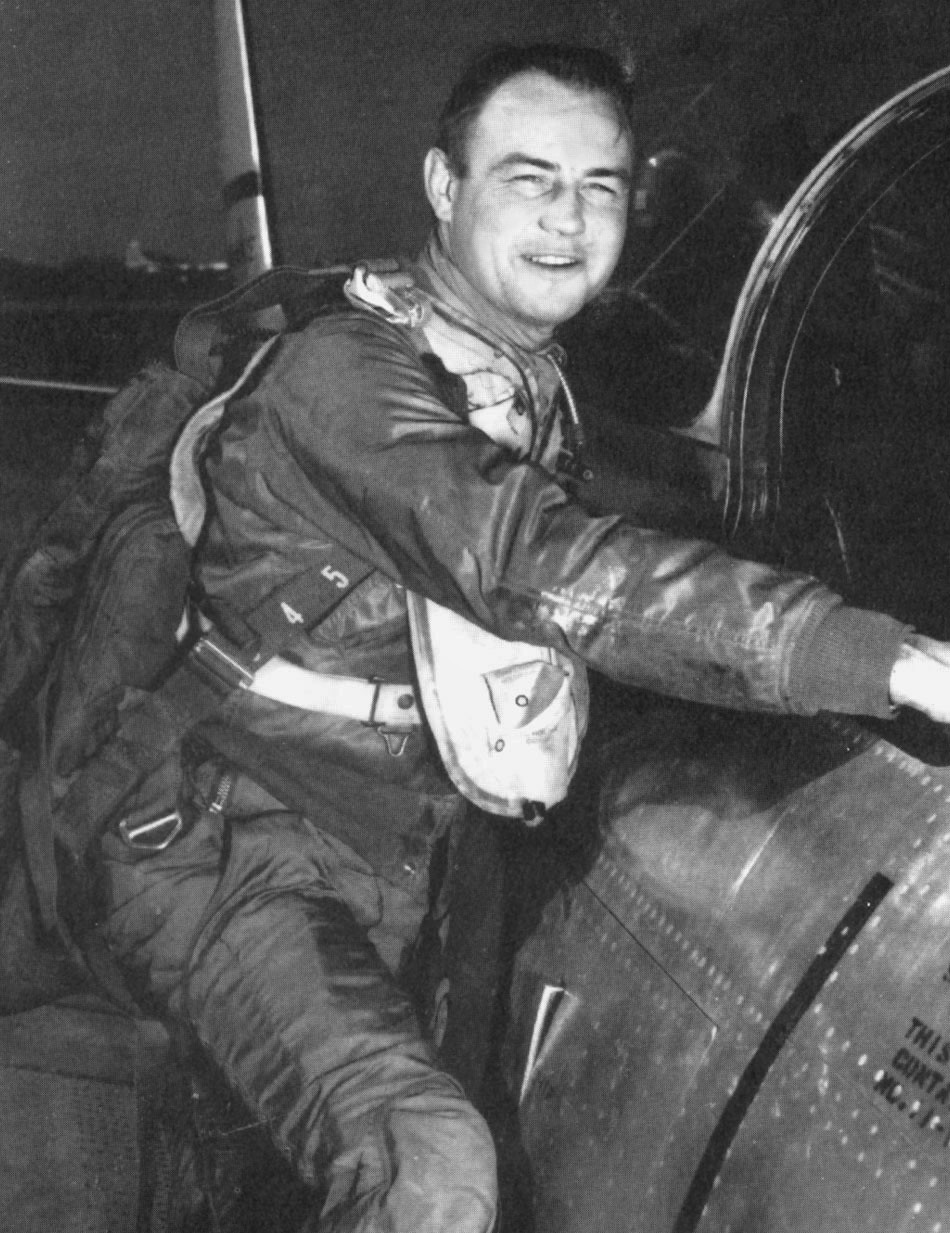
- Hagerstrom with an F-86 Sabre in Korea, c. 1952
- Born: James Philo Hagerstrom; January 14, 1921; Cedar Falls, Iowa, U.S.
- Died: June 25, 1994 (aged 73); Shreveport, Louisiana, U.S.
- Burial place: Arlington National Cemetery
- Spouse: Virginia Lee Jowell (m. 1944)
- Military career
- Allegiance: United States
- Branch: United States Army Air Forces; United States Air Force
- Service years: 1941–1968
- Rank: Colonel
- Service number: 0-727447
- Units: 8th Fighter Squadron; 334th Fighter-Interceptor Squadron
- Commands: 111th Fighter-Bomber Squadron; 67th Fighter-Bomber Squadron; 450th Fighter-Day Group
- Conflicts: World War II; New Guinea campaign; Korean War; MiG Alley; Vietnam War
- Awards: Distinguished Service Cross; Silver Star; Legion of Merit; Distinguished Flying Cross (6)
- Other work: Lawyer

James Philo Hagerstrom (January 14, 1921 – June 25, 1994) was an American pilot and fighter ace who served with both the United States Army Air Forces (USAAF) in World War II and the U.S. Air Force (USAF) in the Korean War. With a career total of 14.5 victories, he is one of seven American pilots to have achieved ace status in two different wars.

Born in Cedar Falls, Iowa, Hagerstrom became eager to fly at a young age. He left college in 1941 to join the USAAF, and participated in the New Guinea campaign of the South West Pacific theater of World War II. There, he mainly escorted bombers, flying P-40 Warhawks with the 8th Fighter Squadron. He shot down six Japanese aircraft during the war, including four in one morning. After the war, he continued flying, joining the Texas Air National Guard and participating in several air races. By 1950 he was in command of the 111th Fighter-Bomber Squadron, which was deployed to Korea following the outbreak of the Korean War. He later transferred to the USAF and flew F-86 Sabre fighter jets with the 18th Fighter-Bomber Wing in "MiG Alley", the nickname given to the area around the northern border of North Korea with China. During his service in Korea, he was credited with shooting down 8.5 Chinese, Soviet, and North Korean MiG-15s (the half coming from a shared credit).

Hagerstrom returned to the U.S. in 1953 and remained in the Air Force, also earning degrees in economics and law. In 1965, he served in command roles during the Vietnam War while flying 30 combat missions. After retiring in 1968, he traveled around the Pacific Ocean in a homemade boat with his family, living on several islands before returning to the U.S. and settling in Mansfield, Louisiana. Hagerstrom died in nearby Shreveport of stomach cancer in 1994.

== Early life and education ==
James Philo Hagerstrom was born on January 14, 1921, in Cedar Falls, Iowa. He was the third son of Edward and Hazel Hagerstrom. His father, the son of Swedish immigrants, worked as an electrician with the Iowa Public Service Company, and the family lived in Waterloo, Iowa. James' interest in aviation began at a young age: when he was five, he had the opportunity to sit in the cockpit of a Curtiss JN-4 "Jenny" biplane at a family friend's farm. His fascination increased at thirteen when he took a short fifty-cent flight in a Ford Trimotor aircraft at an airshow.

Hagerstrom attended Waterloo West High School, where he joined the wrestling team and earned a varsity letter. He also built model airplanes as a hobby, and swam. After graduating in 1939, he began studying at the University of Iowa, where he joined the Army Reserve Officers' Training Corps. After a year he transferred to Iowa State Teachers College, where he helped start an aero club. While in college, he began flight training, accumulating several dozen hours of flying experience.

== Military career ==
=== World War II ===
==== Training and mobilization ====
On December 6, 1941, the day before the attack on Pearl Harbor, Hagerstrom went to Iowa City and enlisted in the U.S. Army Air Forces (USAAF) Aviation Cadet program. He was sent to Fort Des Moines, and was inducted into the USAAF on January 15. He and other new inductees were then sent to Minter Field in Bakersfield, California, for paperwork and more physical examinations, and were sent north to Visalia for primary training on January 23. The class (which wore coveralls and other civilian attire owing to a lack of military uniforms) first trained in PT-22 Recruits. Hagerstrom's previous flying experience allowed him to undertake an accelerated program before moving back to Minter Field for basic flight training in BT-13 Valiants. His older brother Robert happened to be in basic flight training at the same time, and they were together for six weeks. After this phase, Hagerstrom and his classmates went to Luke Field near Phoenix, Arizona, where he underwent advanced flight training in the AT-6 Texan. On July 26, 1942, he graduated and was commissioned as a second lieutenant, receiving his wings from Brigadier General Ennis Whitehead.

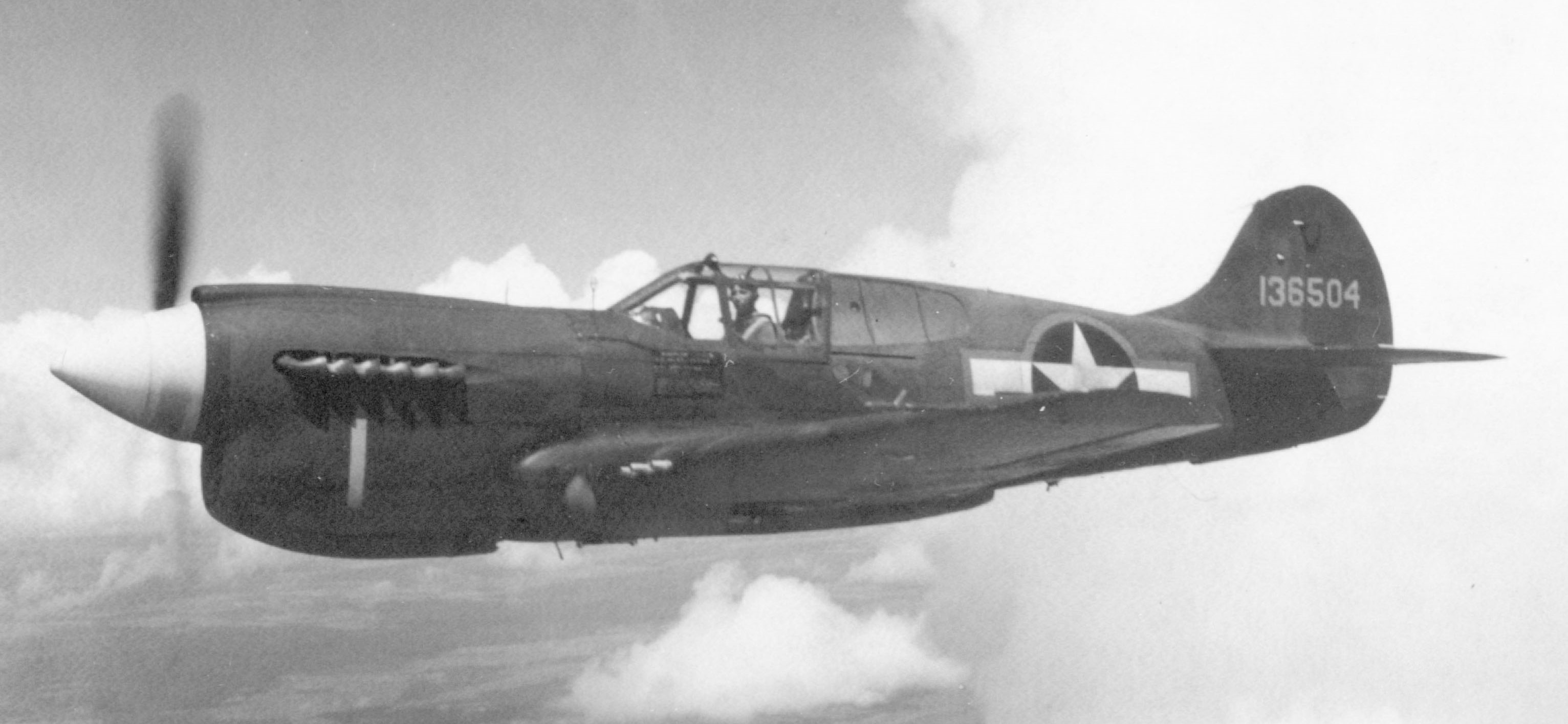
Hagerstrom flew the P-40 Warhawk in World War II.

Hagerstrom was posted to active duty with the 20th Pursuit Group and sent to Myrtle Beach Air Force Base in Myrtle Beach, South Carolina, and then to Pinellas Army Air Field, near St. Petersburg, Florida, flying the P-39 Airacobra and P-40 Warhawk. In late September he was assigned to the 8th Fighter Squadron (8th FS) of the 49th Fighter Group (49th FG) and sent to San Francisco, California. Hagerstrom was temporarily given the duty of quarters officer, and he arranged for the group of forty second lieutenants to stay at the Mark Hopkins Hotel. After processing at Fort Mason, they sailed on the Norwegian troopship M/V Torrens to Hawaii along with 1,500 other personnel, including the headquarters of the Fifth Air Force (5th AF). They stayed for a short time at Hickam Field, near Pearl Harbor, before leaving again, this time as part of a naval task force. Near the end of October, they broke off from the task force and sailed with a destroyer escort to Suva, Fiji, for an overnight stop before heading towards Australia. A corvette from the Royal Australian Navy took over the escort until it arrived in Townsville, Queensland. Initially there was no one to greet the Americans and nowhere to house the 5th AF commanders besides some barracks at RAAF Base Garbutt. Eventually Brigadier General Paul Wurtsmith of the 5th AF organized a refresher session for the new pilots, and they learned from experienced combat aviators at Charters Towers Airfield.

==== New Guinea ====
Hagerstrom joined the rest of the 8th FS at Kila Airfield, near Port Moresby, Territory of Papua, to fight in the New Guinea campaign. He flew several missions out of Kila in the P-40, all without seeing combat. The 8th FS then relocated in early April 1943 to Dobodura Airfield, near Popondetta, to rejoin the rest of the 49th FG. Shortly after, Hagerstrom was promoted to first lieutenant. His first combat experience—and aerial victory—came on April 11, when he joined a fight over Oro Bay with several Japanese A6M Zeros. His first attempt at taking a shot at a Zero failed because his guns were switched off, but he later shot down a Zero that was trailing two P-38 Lightning fighters. He returned to base with little fuel to spare.

I fired my first burst when his wings filled my sight. It hit him in the left engine, wing root and fuselage. The left engine exploded and the aircraft did a steep wing-over due to the sudden loss of power ... I rolled with the "Dinah", firing again at the left wing root and it caught fire. I rolled over and split-essed, only to find he had hit the water.

— Hagerstrom, describing a victory on October 5, 1943

While at Dobodura, the 8th FS mainly escorted C-47 Skytrains airdropping supplies to ground troops below, and Hagerstrom was awarded the Distinguished Flying Cross for his work during this period. At the end of August 1943, the squadron was moved to Tsili Tsili Airfield in the Territory of New Guinea, hastily and covertly constructed in July on recently captured territory. Although it was not known whether the surrounding area was clear of Japanese forces, the airstrip was not attacked after two raids on August 15 and 16 that did little damage. The 8th FS switched to escorting B-25 Mitchell and A-20 Havoc bombers but saw little action themselves. The pilots saw more combat when they began escorting the high-altitude B-17 Flying Fortress and B-24 Liberator bombers; the unit was often low on fuel and other supplies as a result of being at the end of a long supply chain.

On October 5, Hagerstrom led one of two formations to intercept an approaching Ki-46 "Dinah" reconnaissance aircraft over Finschhafen. He chased the plane for twelve minutes, climbing at full throttle to 18,000 feet (5,500 m) before getting within firing range. He was able to damage the Dinah's left engine, wing root, and fuselage. The engine exploded and sprayed what Hagerstrom guessed to be hydraulic fluid onto his plane, causing him eye irritation. He pursued the crippled aircraft until it hit the water. After a malfunction with his navigational instruments, he had to find his way back to the airfield by following the Markham River. The plane was running low on fuel, night had fallen, and Tsili Tsili was in blackout due to another enemy reconnaissance plane in the area, so Hagerstrom had to estimate the airstrip's location but landed safely. Later that month, heavy rainfall made the airstrip too muddy to allow the co-located P-38s to take off, and the 8th FS was relocated 50 miles (80 km) north to Gusap Airfield. Soon after, Hagerstrom contracted malaria and was sent to Australia for three weeks to recover.

On January 23, 1944, Hagerstrom was leading a flight of four aircraft assisting P-38 Lightnings to escort bombers near Wewak. They encountered 10–15 enemy aircraft, and he and his wingman, John Bodak, dove on a group of Zeros that were pursuing four P-38s; Hagerstrom shot down one of the aircraft. He took a shot at another Zero but missed, and was in turn targeted by a Zero on his tail. Bodak destroyed this plane, and Hagerstrom shot down a Zero that was tailing his wingman. He got a third Zero and then went to the assistance of several P-38s who had started a Lufbery circle defensive maneuver. Hagerstrom fired a short burst at one of the pursuing Japanese planes, a Ki-61 "Hien". He followed the damaged aircraft and gave it another burst at short range, causing it to catch fire and crash. Hagerstrom and Bodak damaged several more Zeros before running out of ammunition. Hagerstrom returned home with four victories for a total of six, making him an ace. He was awarded the Distinguished Service Cross for his "extraordinary heroism" during the engagement. By this time in the war, much of the Imperial Japanese Navy Air Service's small, elite pilot corps had been killed in battle, and the Japanese lacked the time and resources to properly train enough replacement airmen. By the end of 1943 most of the surviving Japanese pilots were poorly trained and equipped, while the U.S. had all along concentrated on training a large pool of pilots to an adequate standard. In early February, Hagerstrom received orders to return home from New Guinea, which he called a "terrible place" due to the poor conditions. He had flown 170 combat missions comprising 350 hours and destroyed six enemy aircraft.

=== Between wars ===
External image
- Hagerstrom in the cockpit of a P-38 Lightning plane at the 1949 National Air Races in Cleveland, Ohio

After a period of rest back home in Iowa, Hagerstrom went to Miami, Florida, to be reassigned. He requested a unit that flew jet aircraft, but jets had not reached widespread production, so he was instead made an instructor in the Army Air Forces School of Applied Tactics flying P-47 Thunderbolts at a base near Orlando. There, he met Virginia Lee Jowell, a member of the Women Airforce Service Pilots (WASP), and they were married on July 25, 1944. Shortly after, Virginia was transferred to Brownsville, Texas, to train in fighter aircraft, while he was assigned to Evansville, Indiana, to be a test pilot for the P-47s being produced at the Republic Aviation plant there. The couple were reunited when Virginia finished her training and moved to Evansville to serve as a ferry pilot for the P-47s, delivering them to coastal air bases to be shipped overseas. James was promoted to the rank of captain in January 1945, and he remained in Evansville until September 6 of that year, when he left the USAAF.

Hagerstrom and his now-pregnant wife returned to Waterloo, and he re-applied to Iowa State Teachers College to complete his studies, the president of the college personally re-enrolling him. In October, the first of the Hagerstroms' eight children was born. Hagerstrom graduated in June 1946 with a bachelor's degree in economics and subsequently went to Houston, Texas, to work in the municipal bonds business. He grew bored of the bonds industry and wanted to keep flying, so he joined the 111th Fighter-Bomber Squadron (111th FBS) of the Texas Air National Guard, which he and his fellow pilots viewed as the "bottom of the heap". He enjoyed his tenure with the P-51 Mustang–equipped squadron and was successful, becoming operations officer for the 111th FBS within six months. He flew the P-38 Lightning and P-51 (redesignated as F-51) in the National Air Races in September 1949; he took sixth place in the Thompson Trophy race and won a $1,500 prize, flying his F-51 at an average speed of 372.7 miles per hour (599.8 km/h).

Hagerstrom was promoted to major and appointed commander of the 111th FBS in June 1950. In October, the 111th FBS was federalized and ordered into active duty to serve in the Korean War. Hagerstrom's assignment was at the headquarters of the Tactical Air Command (TAC) at Langley Air Force Base, Virginia, where he persuaded the commander to allow him and some other officers to fly a combat tour in Korea. They were allowed to transfer from the Air National Guard into the active-duty Air Force. Hagerstrom was sent to Nellis Air Force Base in Nevada, where he undertook gunnery training on the jet-powered F-80 Shooting Star and F-86 Sabre, taught by William T. Whisner Jr. He became operations officer of the 4th Fighter-Interceptor Group.

=== Korean War ===
==== Preparation and first two victories (1952) ====
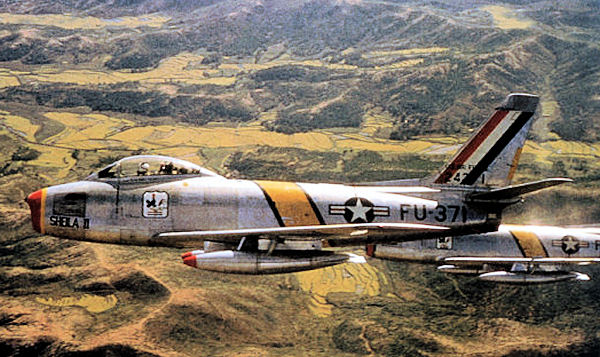
North American F-86F-25-NH Sabre of 18th Fighter-Bomber Wing

Hagerstrom, keen for any edge that would give him the chance to be an ace in two wars, prepared extensively for flying in Korea. He studied gun sights and intelligence reports on the MiG-15, and he made metric conversion tables to allow him to patrol altitudes where MiGs commonly flew. He got a pair of moccasin boots lined with felt and a silk-lined flight suit for winter insulation, and he obtained special half-mirrored sunglasses that allowed him to see twice as clearly as normal, at the risk of permanently ruining his eyes. The Air Force issued its pilots a standard survival kit for their aircraft, to which he added 30 days' worth of food (including 10 pounds [4.5 kg] of rice), a camp stove, maps, a monocular, a radio, sulfa, and a sleeping bag he had vacuum-packed into a tin can. He also obtained a .22 Hornet rifle issued to Strategic Air Command, because he thought the standard .45 caliber pistol would be ineffective against patrols with rifles. If he had to bail out over enemy territory, he planned to fight off any patrols searching for him, and then hike 10 miles (16 km) a day toward the Demilitarized Zone between North and South Korea. According to Hagerstrom, this obsessive preparation helped him control his fear: "the difference between panic and fear is pretty tight, and you can spread that line a bit by having one last chance".

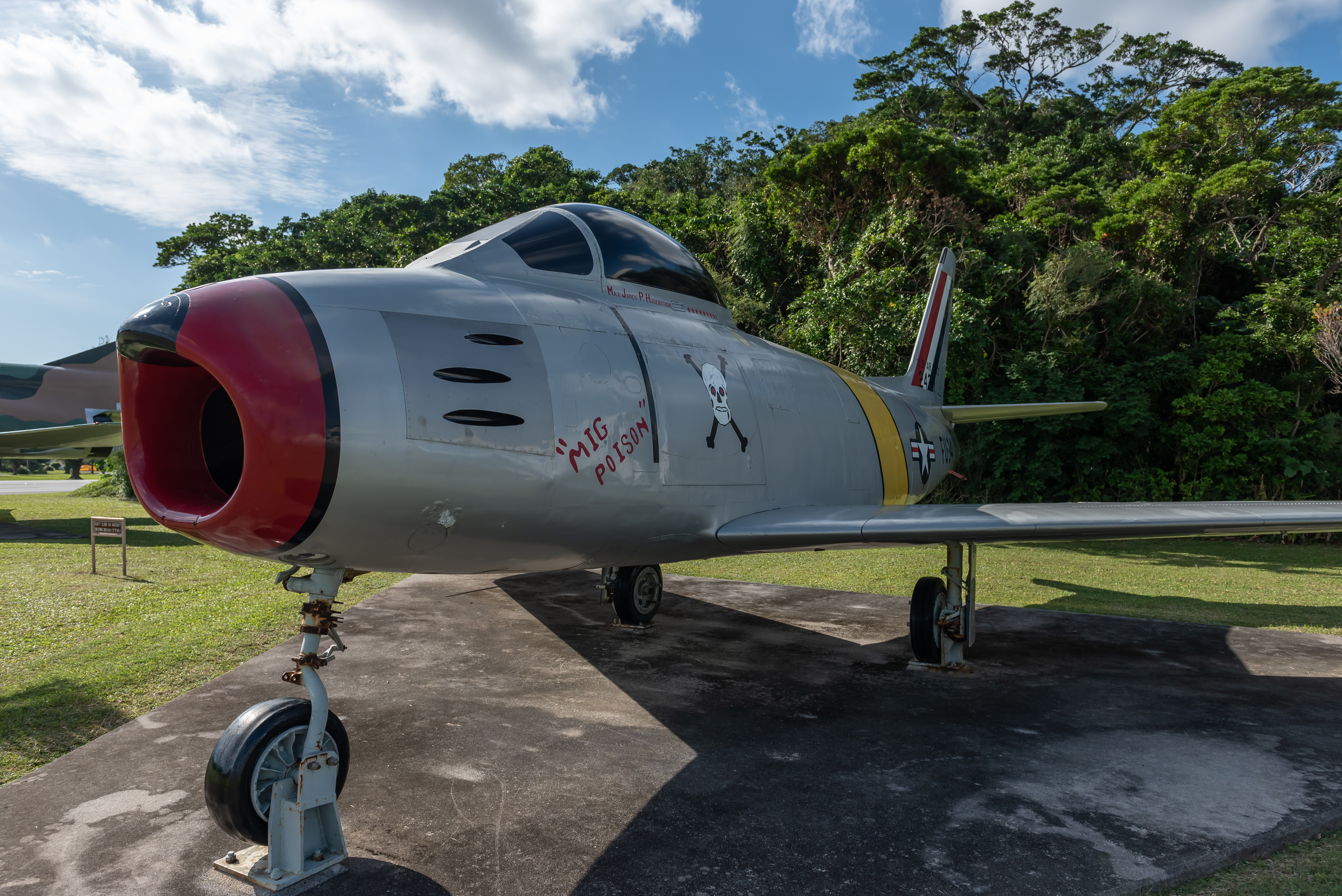
Hagerstrom flew an F-86 Sabre nicknamed "MiG Poison" in the Korean War. The reproduction pictured here is on display at Kadena Air Base in Okinawa, Japan.

Upon arrival in Korea, Hagerstrom was assigned to the 334th Fighter-Interceptor Squadron of the Fifth Air Force's 18th Fighter-Bomber Wing (18th FBW). At this time, the 4th and 51st Fighter-Interceptor Wings were the only units equipped with F-86 Sabres, but Hagerstrom was able to convince his commander to let him and several other officers fly these aircraft, despite not being in the designated wings. Hagerstrom registered the 18th FBW's first victory of the war on November 21, 1952, about 100 miles (160 km) south of the Yalu River. The MiG pilot Hagerstrom was shooting at ejected just before his plane exploded. Hagerstrom was separated from his wingman and no one witnessed the action, so Kimpo Air Base group commander Royal N. Baker refused to confirm it unless he had good film from his gun camera. This proved unnecessary when Baker confirmed the victory after spotting a piece of the exploded MiG embedded in Hagerstrom's F-86. The engagement earned him a second Distinguished Flying Cross, this time with a "V" device, for "courage, tenacity, superior tactical skill and marksmanship".

On December 24, Hagerstrom led a group of jets that attacked three MiGs in formation just south of the Yalu near the Sup'ung Dam. Twenty more MiGs arrived from Manchuria, and Hagerstrom managed to damage three enemy aircraft while being chased as far south as the Chongchon River.

The next day, Hagerstrom was to have the day off for Christmas, but he still wanted more action: "I tried to get some of the men to trade with me—I'm not on the schedule today—but with weather like this, they know there are MiGs up there near the Yalu. No one was willing to trade his mission for my day off." He was able to talk his superiors into giving him a mission, and he ended up getting the only confirmed "kill" of the day when the MiG he was chasing spun out of control at an altitude of 50,000 feet (15,000 m), so high that Hagerstrom did not fire for fear of stalling. The pilot ejected, most likely dying of exposure to the −20 °F (−29 °C) temperatures.

==== Ace status (1953) ====
In January 1953, Hagerstrom was transferred to Osan Air Base to help the rest of the pilots of the 18th FBW transition from F-51s to F-86s, beginning on January 28. Despite cold weather and a limited number of instructor pilots, the wing's 125 pilots were trained in the F-86 in under a month. On February 3, Hagerstrom was named commander of the 67th Fighter-Bomber Squadron, and on February 25 he was part of the 18th FBW's first patrol in Sabre jets. He was chasing two MiGs when he noticed a third attacking another F-86; he engaged and shot it down flying very low over Mukden, China. Low on fuel, he had just enough to land and park the aircraft back at Osan, and he later received the Distinguished Flying Cross for the third time.

On March 13, Hagerstrom and his wingman Elmer N. Dunlap came across two MiGs, the first of which Hagerstrom, by his own account, "shot the daylights out of". He fired at the second until he ran out of ammunition, and the remaining MiG was leaking fuel and its engine had stopped. Hagerstrom told Dunlap to "finish off" the crippled plane, and the MiG's pilot bailed over the enemy's Antung Airfield. That mission gave Hagerstrom a total of 4.5 victories, just short of the five kills needed for ace status. Knowing that he was likely to be transferred out soon, he became even more determined to get another victory, giving a speech to his men on March 27:

Gentlemen, I've been living on coffee. I haven't been sleeping. I've got to do this thing. I'm gonna do it, and if you don't want to go with me, that's fine, I'll understand. We are going to go up there and give it one good college try south of the Yalu, and if we don't scare anything up, I'm going after them today.

I thought, 'I wonder what he's going to tell those guys at the officers club tonight because he's going to be landing very close to his own air base.' Seeing a burning MiG crash on your own base can cause a hell of a morale problem.

— Hagerstrom after shooting down an enemy plane over its own base

That day, Hagerstrom snuck up behind six MiGs, fired on one, and by "sheer ass luck ... knocked his wing tip off". He kept up the chase, shooting short bursts, until the pilot, Chinese ace Wang Hai, ejected above his own base. On the way home, Hagerstrom destroyed another MiG, bringing the total to 6.5. He became the war's 28th ace and the first and only from the 18th FBW. After the engagement, he was awarded the Silver Star for "his outstanding ability and gallantry in the face of enemy opposition".

Hagerstrom scored another victory on April 13, when he fired a long burst at a single MiG flying at 49,000 feet (15,000 m). The plane burst into flames and went down near the Chongchon River. In early May, he learned that he was to return to the U.S. On his last day in Korea, May 16, he was waiting for a Military Air Transport Service plane to become available for his flight out to Tachikawa Airfield in Japan when he got a call from a friend who said he needed four planes in the air. He said, "I got tired of the inaction, so I posted the name 'Sam Kratz' on the flight board and went out as a regular combat officer and not as a squadron commander as on other missions." Hagerstrom took off, still wearing his blue dress uniform instead of a flight suit, and the flight soon came across the formation of 24 MiGs. He pretended to have communication difficulties to prevent the mission from being recalled because they were heavily outnumbered. When the MiGs turned and headed toward the safety of Chinese airspace, Hagerstrom attacked one of the planes and followed it into a dive, firing short bursts. After his target crashed, he pulled out and the flight and headed back to base, reporting the large number of MiGs. During the debriefing, his commanding officer interrupted and assured Hagerstrom that he would be on the next C-54 Skymaster flight out, before he could take another risky flight. He was awarded his eleventh Air Medal in the form of a second silver oak leaf cluster for courage during the flight. The mission gave him 8.5 victories for the war in 101 missions.

==== Attitude toward combat ====
Like many other aces, Hagerstrom had an aggressive attitude toward his missions. In his book Officers in Flight Suits, historian John Darrell Sherwood calls this a "flight suit attitude", which he defines as "a sense of self-confidence and pride that verged on arrogance" where "status was based upon flying ability, not degrees, rank, or 'officer' skills". He believes this is why Hagerstrom frequently butted heads with military bureaucrats and never became a general himself. Determined to be at full mental capacity during missions, he never drank, unlike most other pilots, some of whom flew while hungover or left Korea as alcoholics. He was critical of pilots who wanted to just complete their requisite 100 missions and avoid conflict and danger; he was twice abandoned by his wingman during a fight. Hagerstrom enjoyed the adrenaline rush of combat and would put himself at more risk in an effort to shoot down more planes. He would fly into Chinese airspace despite it being forbidden by United Nations Command, and on one mission he buzzed Antung Airfield by flying near the speed of sound at an altitude of 15 feet (4.6 m) in an attempt to draw the MiGs into the air because U.S. pilots were not allowed to attack planes on the ground in China.

The F-86 bases were near Seoul, South Korea, which was 200 miles (320 km) from where they would patrol in MiG Alley. Getting there used so much fuel that they were supposed to spend only twenty minutes flying around the Yalu in search of MiGs, but Hagerstrom did his own calculations and determined he could make it back to base with 600 pounds (270 kg) of fuel—half of the recommended minimum. He had to set an alarm to remind himself when to head back, but he often went beyond that, once running out of gas just after landing. Unlike all the other American aces, who were in fighter-interceptor units, Hagerstrom was in a fighter-bomber squadron but found aerial combat by dropping his bombs as quickly as possible and flying to where he was likely to encounter MiGs.

Regarding shooting down planes, Hagerstrom focused on the machine rather than the human in the aircraft, saying "I never shot directly at the pilot, nor did I shoot anyone dangling from a parachute." He had a similar response whenever a fellow American or allied pilot was killed: he thought about the technical aspects of the death and how it could be prevented in the future, rather than grieving the loss of a friend. During World War II, he said, "There is no emotion like is shown in the movies. They just say, 'Tough luck.'"

=== After Korea ===
Hagerstrom remained in the USAF after he returned to the U.S. After a reunion with his family, he was assigned to the Operations Section of the Ninth Air Force at Pope Air Force Base in Fayetteville, North Carolina. He flew an F-86 in the September 1953 Bendix Trophy air race, which went from California to Ohio, finishing thirty seconds behind the winner. He was promoted to lieutenant colonel in June 1954. He became a TAC officer at Foster Air Force Base in Victoria, Texas, and commanded the 450th Fighter-Day Squadron of the 322d Fighter-Day Group. During his tenure at Foster, he was named inspector general and base commander, and in May 1955, he was given command of the 450th Fighter-Day Group, which flew the F-100 Super Sabre.

In 1956, Hagerstrom was transferred to the headquarters of the Far East Air Forces (FEAF) in Japan as chief of the fighter branch. During that tour of duty, he went to Taiwan to teach members of the Republic of China Air Force about combat against MiGs. He briefly returned to Texas as an advisor for the Air National Guard and in April 1957 was honored with the dedication of a new hangar at Ellington Field in Houston in his name. He then was sent to Hawaii to join the staff of the FEAF—which had been renamed the Pacific Air Forces (PACAF)—at its new headquarters at Hickam Air Force Base. He was promoted to colonel in March 1959, and earned a master's degree in economics from Jackson College. His job with the PACAF was to assess the air forces of the U.S. and their allies; after evaluating the new AIM-9 Sidewinder air-to-air missile, he advocated for retaining guns on fighter jets instead of replacing them with missiles on some aircraft, an opinion at odds with military leadership.

In 1960, he left Hawaii for a position with the Office of Inspector General at Norton Air Force Base in San Bernardino, California. While at Norton, he studied at Loyola Law School in Los Angeles three nights a week before attending the Industrial College of the Armed Forces (ICAF), which required him to relocate to Washington, D.C. Once settled, he also enrolled at Georgetown Law. He graduated from the ICAF in June 1964, having written a thesis on the role of air power in a limited war. The next day, he received his Bachelor of Laws degree from Georgetown. His next assignment was as vice wing commander of the 8th Tactical Fighter Wing, flying F-4 Phantom IIs at George Air Force Base in Victorville, California.

=== Vietnam War ===
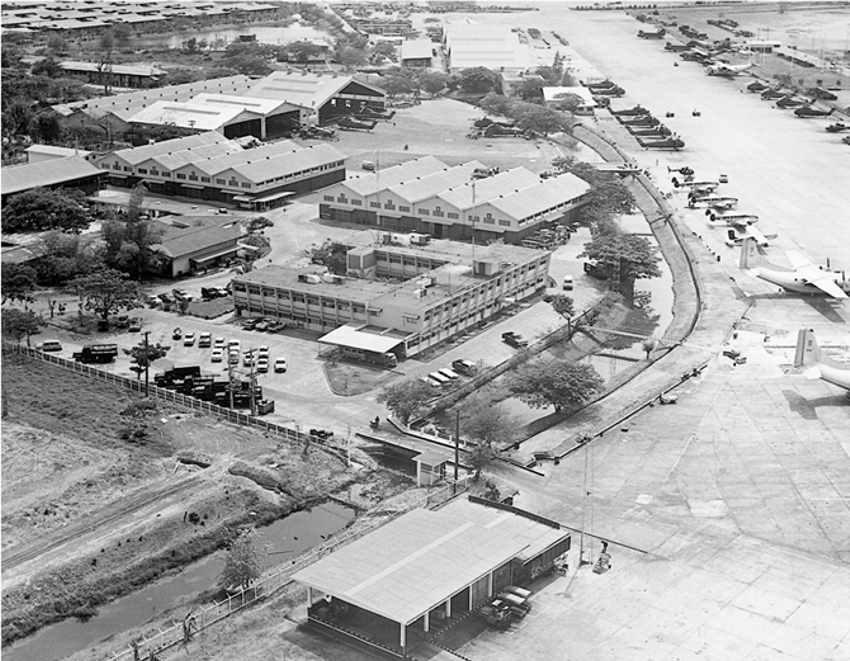
The Air America headquarters at Udorn Royal Thai Air Force Base in Thailand, taken in the 1960s

Throughout 1965, President Lyndon B. Johnson led a major escalation of American involvement in the Vietnam War. In May of that year, Hagerstrom was posted to Saigon, South Vietnam, to serve with the Seventh Air Force. There, he flew 30 combat missions while serving as director of the combat operations control center at Tan Son Nhut Air Base. He soon came into conflict with General William Westmoreland over the Air Force's role in the Military Assistance Command, Vietnam. Hagerstrom proposed that air assets be used against strategic targets in North Vietnam, while Westmoreland insisted that they be used solely in-country to support Army ground operations. After Hagerstrom argued against the decision not to bomb Hanoi in 1965, Westmoreland asked the Air Force to remove Hagerstrom from Vietnam. Hagerstrom was awarded the Legion of Merit for his service in Vietnam, and the citation mentions his "significant contributions to the combat effectiveness of the tactical air forces".

In early 1966, the Air Force reassigned Hagerstrom to Udorn Royal Thai Air Force Base, Thailand. In four days he set up a combat operations control center to conduct air interdiction operations against the North Vietnamese Army on the Ho Chi Minh trail. On March 3, Royal Lao Air Force commander Thao Ma requested help from the USAF in defending the town of Attopeu, Laos. The Royal Lao Armed Forces were suffering low morale and faced pressure from Viet Cong (VC) fighters, who had taken two nearby towns. Hagerstrom assisted in planning the use of an AC-47 Spooky gunship equipped with a night vision Starlight Scope (which had previously been typically used by ground forces) to attack VC positions around the town. The airstrike on the VC took place on the night of March 4 and was successful despite several malfunctions, and the aircraft was not hit by enemy fire. Hagerstrom said he conservatively estimated that 200 VC were killed in the attack, using this to argue that air attacks cause fewer friendly casualties than a war of attrition strategy with ground forces.

Hagerstrom also tried to obtain the release of James Robinson Risner, a prisoner of war who had also been an ace in Korea. Hagerstrom enlisted the help of CBS News anchor Walter Cronkite and lawyer James B. Donovan (who had negotiated the release of Francis Gary Powers after the 1960 U-2 incident) to start a fundraiser for Risner's bail, but the U.S. State Department stepped in and halted the effort. Hagerstrom was sent back to Norton later in 1966, frustrated by the political and military bureaucracy he had clashed with over his career. "I got disgusted with the whole thing and resigned," he said. "Vietnam was wrong, we shouldn't have been there".

== Retirement ==
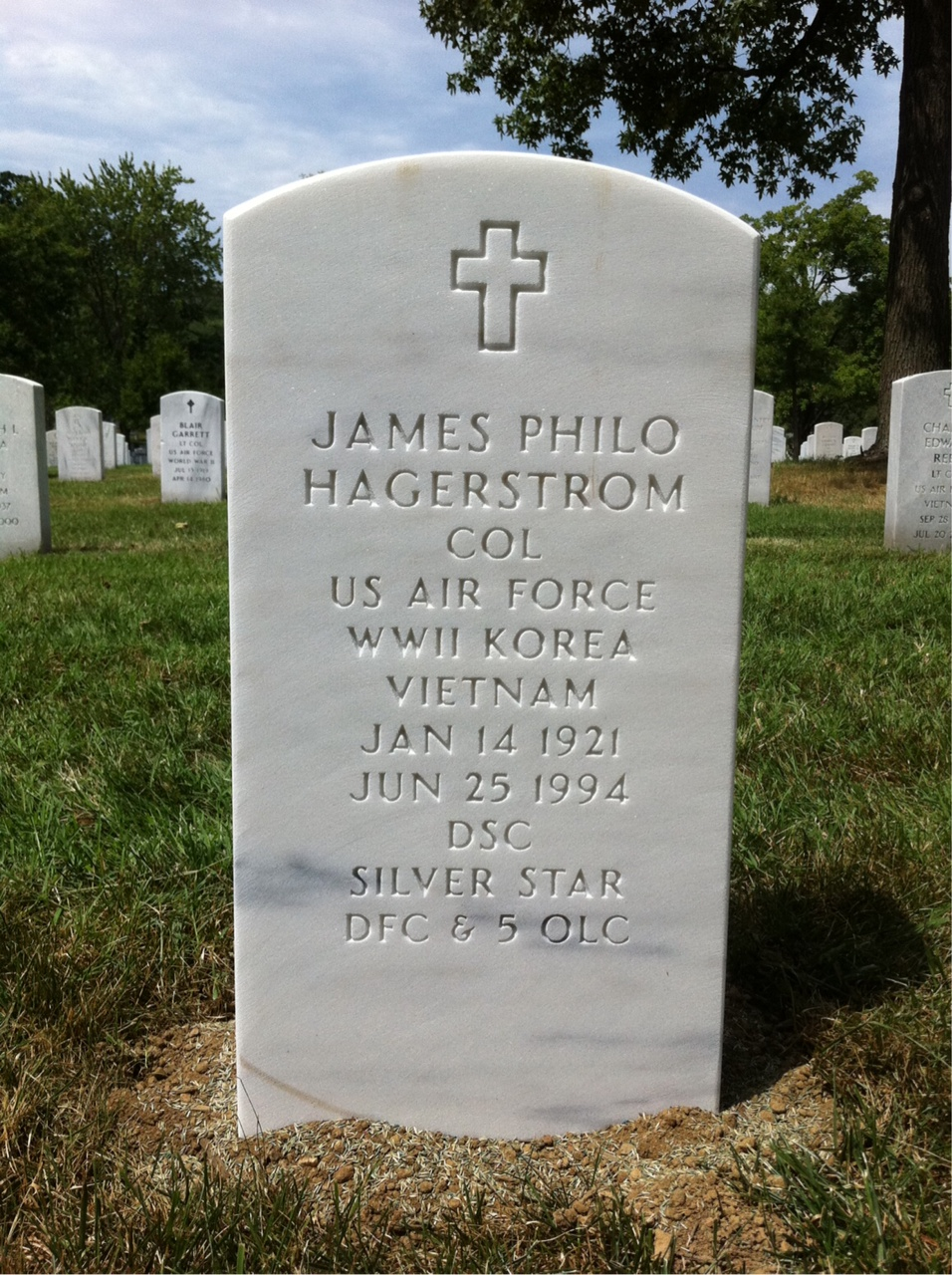
Hagerstrom's gravestone at Arlington National Cemetery

Back at Norton, Hagerstrom sat and passed the California Bar Examination and retired from the Air Force in January 1968. He lectured at the University of Southern California and worked for a law firm in Los Angeles. Later that year, along with Virginia and their eight children, he began living on a boat, sailing along the Pacific coast of Mexico. In mid-1969, they stopped at San Diego and Hagerstrom began practicing law there. They did not settle; he and his wife began building their own boat in 1971. Four years later, they had completed the 30-short-ton (27 t), 57-foot (17 m) sailboat and set sail on March 19, 1976. They returned to the Mexican coast before heading to Hawaii. They continued on to the Marshall Islands and Caroline Islands (then part of the Trust Territory of the Pacific Islands), and Guam. In many of their stops, Hagerstrom practiced law (becoming district attorney for the island of Kosrae), and Virginia taught.

The family eventually returned to the U.S. in 1979 and settled on a farm in Mansfield, Louisiana. Hagerstrom maintained his love of flying, and in 1992 planned to buy an ultralight aircraft. He died of stomach cancer on June 25, 1994, in nearby Shreveport. Hagerstrom was survived by his wife and six of his children; on July 26 he was buried with full military honors at Arlington National Cemetery.

== Aerial victory credits ==
Hagerstrom was credited with 14.5 victories—6 in World War II and 8.5 in the Korean War—as well as one probably destroyed and five damaged. He is one of seven American pilots to achieve ace status in two wars; all flew piston-engined planes in World War II and jet fighters in Korea. The others are George Andrew Davis Jr., Gabby Gabreski, Vermont Garrison, Harrison Thyng, and Whisner, all Air Force pilots, and John F. Bolt of the U.S. Marine Corps.

Date	#	Type	Location	Aircraft flown	Unit
April 11, 1943	1	A6M Zero	Oro Bay, New Guinea	P-40 Warhawk	8 FS
October 5, 1943	1	Ki-46	Finschhafen, New Guinea	P-40 Warhawk	8 FS
January 23, 1944	3	A6M Zero	Wewak, New Guinea	P-40 Warhawk	8 FS
January 23, 1944	1	Ki-61 Hien	Wewak, New Guinea	P-40 Warhawk	8 FS
November 21, 1952	1	MiG-15	Near Yalu River, China/North Korea	F-86 Sabre	334 FIS
December 25, 1952	1	MiG-15	Sinsi-dong, North Korea	F-86 Sabre	335 FIS
February 25, 1953	1	MiG-15	Mukden, China	F-86 Sabre	67 FBS
March 13, 1953	1.5	MiG-15	Antung, North Korea	F-86 Sabre	67 FBS
March 27, 1953	2	MiG-15	Near Yalu River, China/North Korea	F-86 Sabre	67 FBS
April 13, 1953	1	MiG-15	Taegwan-dong, North Korea	F-86 Sabre	67 FBS
May 16, 1953	1	MiG-15	Uiju, North Korea	F-86 Sabre	67 FBS

== Awards and decorations ==
Hagerstrom received numerous awards and decorations for his services:

Command Pilot
Distinguished Service Cross		Silver Star
Legion of Merit	Distinguished Flying Cross with silver oak leaf cluster	Air Medal with two silver oak leaf clusters
Air Force Commendation Medal	Air Force Presidential Unit Citation with bronze oak leaf cluster	American Defense Service Medal
American Campaign Medal	Asiatic-Pacific Campaign Medal with three bronze campaign stars	World War II Victory Medal
National Defense Service Medal with bronze service star	Korean Service Medal with two bronze campaign stars	Vietnam Service Medal
Air Force Longevity Service Award with silver oak leaf cluster	Armed Forces Reserve Medal	Republic of Korea Presidential Unit Citation
United Nations Korea Medal	Republic of Vietnam Campaign Medal	Korean War Service Medal (Note: In 2000 this award was made retroactive to all U.S. military personnel who served in the Korean War.)

=== Distinguished Service Cross citation ===

First Lieutenant (Air Corps) James P. Hagerstrom (ASN: 0-727447), United States Army Air Forces, for extraordinary heroism in connection with military operations against an armed enemy while serving as Pilot of a P-40 Fighter Airplane in the 8th Fighter Squadron, 49th Fighter Group, Fifth Air Force, in aerial combat against enemy forces near Boram, New Guinea, on 23 January 1944. First Lieutenant Hagerstrom, leading a flight of four fighters on a bomber escort mission, encountered ten to fifteen enemy aircraft and promptly led in the attack. He shot down one enemy airplane, and then attacked two others, scoring damaging hits. Pulling up, he quickly shot down another enemy fighter. Two of the enemy then attacked from a climbing head-on position, and he scored damaging hits on both. Making a close pass at another enemy fighter, he caused it to burst into flames. At this point, he observed four enemy airplanes making a concentrated attack upon two of our fighters. Without hesitation he entered the fight, and succeeded in shooting down one enemy airplane and breaking the enemy formation. By his daring skill and aggressive effort in this fierce encounter, First Lieutenant Hagerstrom destroyed four enemy aircraft, damaged others, and saved the lives of two pilots while our bombers successfully completed their mission.

== See also ==
- List of Korean War flying aces
- List of World War II flying aces

== Sources ==
=== Books ===
- Catchpole, Brian (2000). The Korean War, 1950–53. New York: Carroll & Graff. ISBN 978-0-7867-0780-5.
- Craven, Wesley Frank; Cate, James Lea, eds. (1983). The Pacific: Guadalcanal to Saipan, August 1942 to July 1944. The Army Air Forces in World War II. Vol. 4. Washington, D.C.: Office of Air Force History. ISBN 0-912799-03-X.
- Densford, James T., ed. (1973). From Jennies to Jets: The Story of the 111th Squadron. Dallas: Taylor Publishing. OCLC 10559205.
- Hall, Mitchell (2018). The Vietnam War. New York: Routledge. ISBN 978-1-138-68600-7.
- Hammel, Eric M. (2010). Air War Pacific: Chronology. Pacifica, California: Pacifica Military History. ISBN 978-1-890988-10-4.
- Hess, William N. (2004). 49th Fighter Group: Aces of the Pacific. Oxford, England: Osprey Publishing. ISBN 978-1-47280-249-1.
- Maurer, Maurer, ed. (June 1963). USAF Historical Study No. 81: USAF Credits for the Destruction of Enemy Aircraft, Korean War (PDF). Montgomery, Alabama: USAF Historical Division.
- Maurer, Maurer, ed. (1983). Air Force Combat Units of World War II. Washington, D.C.: U.S. Government Printing Office. ISBN 978-0-91279-902-5.
- Newton, Wesley P. Jr.; Senning, Calvin F.; et al. (1978). USAF Historical Study No. 85: USAF Credits for the Destruction of Enemy Aircraft, World War II (PDF). Montgomery, Alabama: USAF Historical Division.
- Oliver, William E.; Lorenz, Dwight L. (1999). The Inner Seven: The History of Seven Unique American Combat "Aces" of World War II and Korea. Pacudah, Kentucky: Turner Publishing Company. ISBN 978-1-56311-504-2.
- Peattie, Mark (2001). Sunburst: The Rise of Japanese Naval Air Power, 1909–1941. Annapolis, Maryland: Naval Institute Press. ISBN 978-1-61251-436-9.
- Porter, Melvin F. (1966). The Defense of Attopeu. Honolulu, Hawaii: Pacific Air Forces Tactical Evaluation Center. doi:10.21236/ada586293.
- Sherwood, John Darrell (1996). Officers in Flight Suits: The Story of American Air Force Fighter Pilots in the Korean War. New York: New York University Press. ISBN 978-0-8147-8038-1. JSTOR j.ctt9qg3ps.
- Werrell, Kenneth P. (2005). "James Hagerstrom: F-86 Ace Not with the 4th or 51st". Sabres over MiG Alley: The F-86 and the Battle for Air Superiority in Korea. Annapolis, Maryland: Naval Institute Press. pp. 183–185. ISBN 978-1-61251-344-7.
- Zhang, Xiaoming (2002). Red Wings Over the Yalu: China, the Soviet Union, and the Air War in Korea. College Station, Texas: Texas A&M University Press. ISBN 1-58544-201-1.

=== Newspapers and magazines ===
- "Air Race Results on Last Day". Cleveland Plain Dealer. September 6, 1949. p. 6 – via NewsBank.
- Ballard, Larry (July 16, 1995). "Waterloo 'ace' remembered in book". Waterloo-Cedar Falls Courier. pp. A1, A4 – via NewspaperArchive.com.
- "Christmas Day Can't Stop Top-Notch Sabre Fighters". Spokane Daily Chronicle. December 25, 1952. p. 6 – via Google News Archive.
- Edgerton, Karl R. (July 12, 1966). "Ace of Two Wars Says: Pressure Cancels Cong Monsoon Drive". The San Bernardino County Sun. p. 2 – via Newspapers.com.
- Feit, Harvey (September 12, 1965). "S.B. Man Plans Viet Air Strikes". The San Bernardino County Sun. pp. 1, 3 – via California Digital Newspaper Collection.
- "Foe Uses 60 MiG's in Korea Sorties". The New York Times. December 25, 1952. p. 2. ProQuest 112391165.
- "Hagerstrom, Col. James P., USAF (Ret.)". The Washington Post. July 20, 1994. p. D4. ProQuest 750973631.
- "Highly Honored Pilot Retires From Service". The San Bernardino County Sun. February 12, 1968 – via Newspapers.com.
- Kelly, Vicki (July 18, 1977). "From Jennys to Jets...: A History Of Our Hometown Guard". The News. Friendswood, Texas. p. 4 – via NewspaperArchive.com.
- "New Air Officers at Foster Have Record of Combat and Service". The Victoria Advocate. August 12, 1954. p. 8 – via Google News Archive.
- "Red Thrusts Repulsed, Supply Depots Pounded". The Oregonian. December 25, 1952. p. 4 – via NewsBank.
- Sherwood, John Darrell (September 2000). "On Guard over MiG Alley: The James P. Hagerstrom Story" (PDF). The on Guard. Vol. XXVIV, no. 10. Arlington, Virginia: National Guard Bureau. Archived from the original (PDF) on December 27, 2016.
- "Thirty Fighter Pilots to Form Panel For Discussion of Viet Nam Air War". The San Bernardino County Sun. November 25, 1966 – via Newspapers.com.
- "Tyler Jet Ace Comes Home To See Family". The Dallas Morning News. May 30, 1953. p. 13 – via NewsBank.
- "U.S. Pilots Tell How They Teamed Up To Shoot Down MIGs". Brownwood Bulletin. March 13, 1953. p. 1 – via Newspapers.com.
- Veach, Francis C. (March 26, 1944). "Air Heroes Hagerstrom and Ludtke Enjoy Visit at Home". Waterloo Sunday Courier. p. 19.

=== Online sources and records ===
- "1940 United States Census", United States census, 1940; Waterloo, Iowa; roll T627_1139, page 61A, line 27, enumeration district 7-26.
- Dollman, Daniel (September 5, 2018). "67 Fighter Squadron (PACAF)". Air Force Historical Research Agency.
- "Forging the Air National Guard". 171st Air Refueling Wing. Air National Guard. December 22, 2016. Archived from the original on November 7, 2017.
- Griset, Rick (August 28, 2017). "8th Fighter Squadron" (PDF). Luke Air Force Base.
- Hankins, Michael (August 13, 2020). "Building the U.S. Air Force: The Legacy of World War II Aces". National Air and Space Museum.
- Inouye, Daniel (July 20, 1994). "In honor of Col. James P. Hagerstrom, USAF (ret.)". THOMAS. Library of Congress. Archived from the original on March 16, 2016.
- "James P Hagerstrom". Social Security Death Index. Archived from the original on March 4, 2016 – via FamilySearch.
- "Korean Service Medal". Naval History & Heritage Command. Archived from the original on February 3, 2015.
- McCrery, Jim (July 26, 1994). "In tribute to Col. James Hagerstrom". THOMAS. Library of Congress. Archived from the original on March 8, 2016.
- "Valor awards for James P. Hagerstrom". Hall of Valor. Sightline Media Group. Archived from the original on November 11, 2017.
