= Gazette de Berne =

Newspaper published in Bern, Switzerland (1689–1798)

- Nouvelles de divers endroits
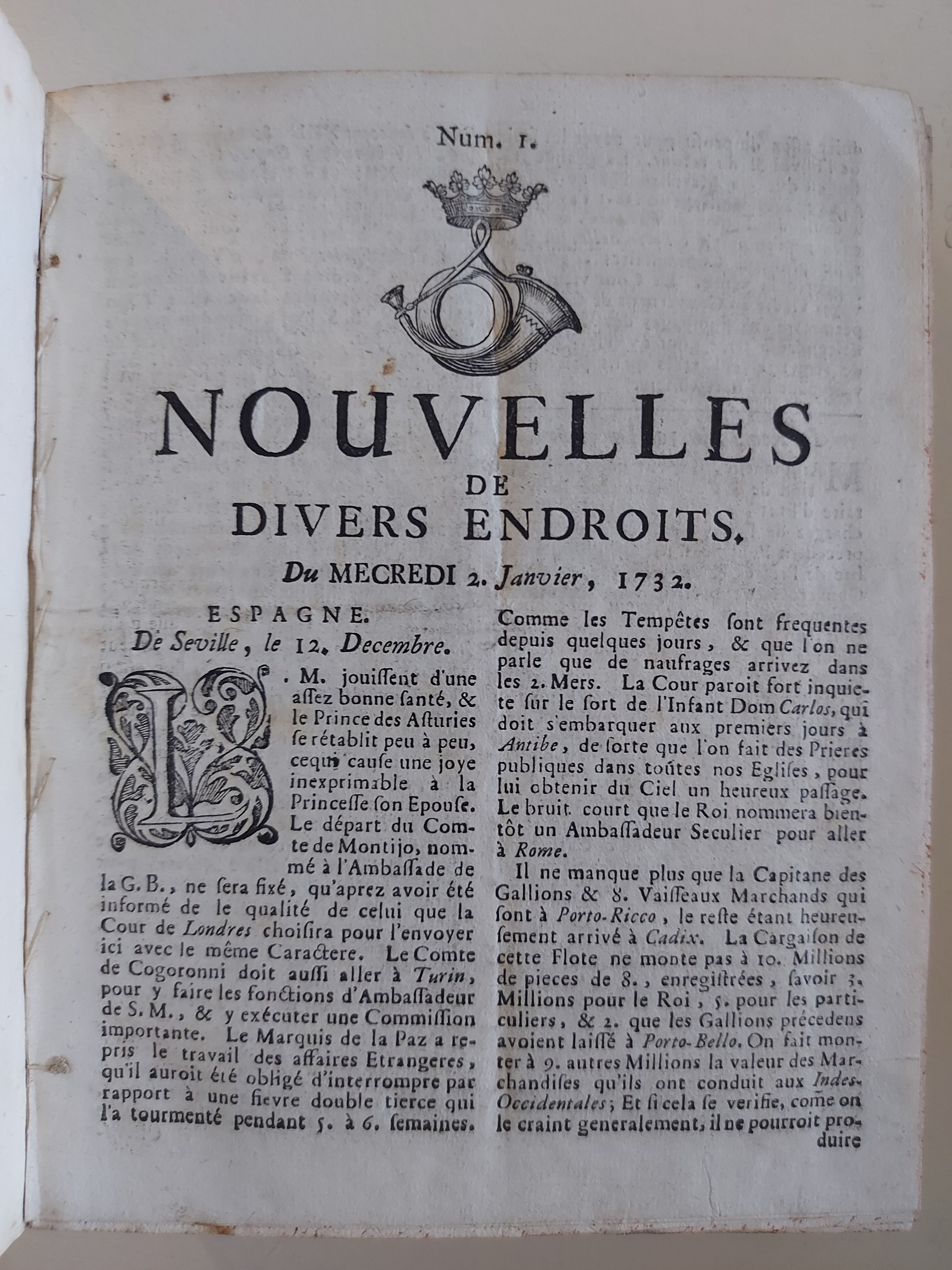
- issue of 2 Jan 1732
- Founder: Beat Fischer
- Founded: 1689
- Ceased publication: March 3, 1798
- Language: French
- City: Bern
- Country: Switzerland

Gazette de Berne was a newspaper published in Bern, Switzerland, from 1689 to 3 March 1798. Officially, the newspaper published in Bern was called Nouvelles de divers endroits from 1689 to 1787 and Nouvelles politiques from 1788 to 1798, but it was known as the Gazette de Berne. From 1677 and up to 1688, another newspaper was published in Bern, named La Gazette, of which only a few numbers survive.

== History ==
When the patrician Beat Fischer received a concession from the State of Bern to operate a postal company in 1675, he was also given the task of supplying the authorities with newspapers from abroad. On this basis, Fischer entered the newspaper business and had his own newspapers printed in Bern. In 1689 he employed a French Huguenot, Antoine Teissier, as editor to produce the new newspaper, which appeared from 1689 to 1798. The next editors were Jean-Jacques Despraz (active in 1721), André de Maucourant (from 1734 to 1767), Antoine Delorme (in 1768) followed by François-Jacques Durand, and Sigismond d'Arnay (from 1786).

It was published in French twice a week on Wednesday and Saturday, each issue was four to eight pages long, including a Supplement. Inte the first years the title and the publication information in the front page included just the number of issue and the title itself (Nouvelles de divers endroits) with the date usually placed at the bottom of last page; since October 1718 the date was printed under the title; and since 1732 an image of a crowned horn was added. From 2 January 1788 to 1798 the name was changed in Nouvelles politiques in order to reduce the space in the first page for the title, and the look of the first page contained just the year, the title into a flowery frame, and the date, and the Supplement passed from 2 to 4 pages.

Only about two-thirds of the published issues are still existing, scattered in different libraries. About 40,000 pages have been digitized and published online, mainly on the website e-newspaperarchives.ch run by the Swiss National Library.

== Content ==
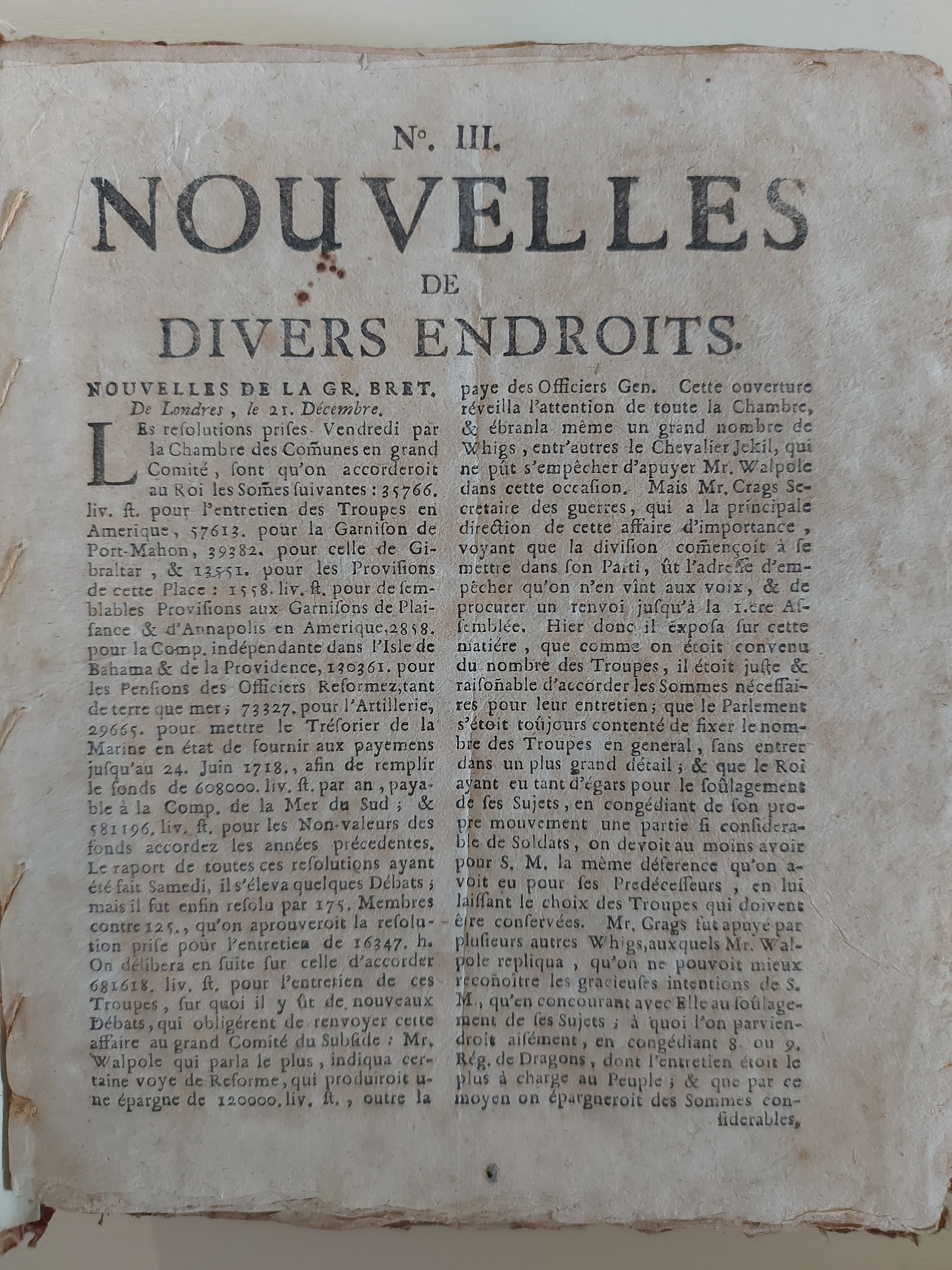
Issue of 8 Jan 1718

The Gazette de Berne wanted to make Bern political circles acquainted with the most important events abroad. It included news from many parts of the Europe with a focus on reports from Paris and London. The Gazette took a critical stance on French policy; only after the French Revolution did it sympathize with the new regime in the neighboring country. The French ambassador to Switzerland therefore repeatedly complained to the Bern government about reports in the Gazette.

Politically innocuous news from Bern or the Swiss Confederation was only occasionally published. This also has to do with the fact that the censorship authorities intervened particularly in the case of unpleasant reports about events from their own territory. The news were grouped by places of origin. Due to long times for travelling in that time, there was usually a long period of time between an event and its publication. For each news, two information were given in a row: city of origin and date. In case of bad weather or difficult road conditions, the news sometimes failed to appear, or the news arrived in Bern with a delay. The editors also worked with news from foreign newspapers, which they assembled and rewrote. The reports bore the titles of the town or location from which they came. In the 18th century, the newspaper sometime contained advertisements aimed at the upper class, such as real estate, inns or new books. After the French Revolution, the Gazette reported extensively on the events in Paris. The paper also repeatedly wrote about Rousseau and Voltaire.
