= Google News Archive =

Online newspaper website archive

- Website type: Newspaper archive
- Available in: English; German; French; Spanish; Italian; Polish; Portuguese; Chinese; Japanese; Korean; Dutch; Arabic; Hebrew; Norwegian; Czech; Hungarian; Swedish; Greek; Russian; Hindi; Telugu; Tamil; Turkish; Malayalam
- Dissolved: yes
- Creator: Google
- Website: news.google.com/newspapers
- Registration: Not required
- Launched: June 6, 2006; 20 years ago
- Current status: Scanning project discontinued; search function "facelift" is "in the works"

Google News Archive is an extension of Google News providing free access to scanned archives of newspapers and links to other newspaper archives on the web, both free and paid.

Some of the news archives date back to 18th century. There is a timeline view available, to select news from various years.

== History ==
The archive went live on June 6, 2006, after Google acquired PaperofRecord.com, originally created by Robert J. Huggins and his team at Cold North Wind, Inc. The acquisition was not publicly announced by Cold North Wind until 2008.

While the service initially provided a simple index of other web pages, on September 8, 2008, Google News began to offer indexed content from scanned newspapers. The depth of chronological coverage varies.

Newspapers were thought to have escaped copyright obligations of news articles because of Google's method of publishing the archives as searchable image files of the actual newspaper pages, rather than as pure text of articles.

In 2011, Google announced that it would no longer add content to the archive project. On August 14, 2011, without notice, Google made the News Archives home page unavailable. Apparently, the service merged with Google News. Carly Carlioi, an editor at the Boston Phoenix, speculated that Google discontinued the project because they found it harder than expected, for newspapers were more difficult to index than books because of layout complexities. Another cause might have been that the project attracted a lesser audience than expected.

While archived newspapers are still available for browsing, keyword searching is not fully functional. On December 16, 2013, Google News employee Stacie Chan wrote in the Google Product Forums that Google News is "performing a much needed facelift on our News Archive search function", and that access to archived stories would be limited for several months while "this new system" is being built. This was reaffirmed on May 22 and July 30, 2014, when Chan wrote that Google is still "working on the archives to provide a better user experience", and "it's in the works", and again on December 18, 2014, when Chan wrote that Google "is currently working on creating a better experience on the Newspaper Archives that should be available in the near future."

Some papers formerly included in the News Archive have been removed because of copyright issues. For instance, the archives of the Milwaukee Journal Sentinel disappeared on August 16, 2016, due to a contract between the paper's owner, the Gannett Company, and NewsBank.

== See also ==
- List of online newspaper archives
- List of Google products
