= National bibliography =

Systematic bibliography of acquisitions of a national library

A national bibliography is a systematic bibliography of acquisitions of a national library. Most countries either have a national bibliography or are in the process of compiling one. Some countries that do not have a national bibliography of their own participate in larger, regional bibliographies, such as the Arab Bulletin of Publications, the CARICOM Bibliography, Bibliografía Actual del Caribe, Boletin Bibliografico, or the South Pacific Bibliography.

== Current national bibliographies ==
Country	Bibliography
Afghanistan	None
Andorra	Andorra National Bibliography; Ex-libris Casa Bauró: Fulls de bibliografia
Angola	None
Argentina	None
Australia	Australian National Bibliography
Austria	Austrian National Bibliography; Österreichische Bibliographie
Belgium	Belgian Bibliography; Belgische Bibliografie; Bibliographie de Belgique
Belize	Belize National Bibliography
Bermuda (Note: Bermuda is a British Overseas Territory.)	Bermuda National Bibliography
Bhutan	None
Brazil	Brazil Bibliography; Bibliografia Brasileira
Brunei	None
Burkina Faso	None
Burundi	None
Cambodia	None
Cameroon	None
Canada	Canadiana: The National Bibliography of Canada
Cape Verde	None
Central African Republic	None
Chad	None
China	China National Bibliography 中国国家书目
Colombia	Bibliografía Colombiana
Comoros	None
Costa Rica	Bibliografía Costarricense
Croatia	Croatian National Bibliography; Hrvatska nacionalna bibliografija
Cyprus	Cyprus Bibliography (Bulletin of the Cyprus Bibliography); Δελτίον Κυπριακής Βιβλιογραφίας
Czech Republic	Czech National Bibliography; Česká národní bibliografie
Denmark	Danish National Bibliography
Djibouti	None
Dominica	None
El Salvador	None
Equatorial Guinea	None
Eritrea	None
Estonia	Estonian National Bibliography; Eesti rahvusbibliograafia
Finland	Finnish National Bibliography (FENNICA)
France	French National Bibliography; Bibliographie nationale française
Gabon	None
Germany	Deutsche Nationalbibliografie
Greece	Greek National Bibliography
Guatemala	None
Guinea	None
Guinea-Bissau	None
Haiti	None
Hungary	Magyar Nemzeti Bibliográfia
Iceland	Icelandic National Bibliography
India	Indian National Bibliography
Indonesia	Bibliografi Nasional Indonesia
Iran	National Bibliography of Iran
Israel	National Bibliography of the State of Israel and of the Jewish People; Qiryat Sefer
Italy	Italian National Bibliography; Bibliografia nazionale italiana (BNI)
Japan	Japanese National Bibliography (JNB)
Latvia	Latvia National Bibliography
Lebanon	None
Lithuania	Lithuanian National Bibliography
Malaysia	Malaysian National Bibliography
Malta	Malta National Bibliography; Bibljografija nazzjonali ta’ Malta
Mauritius	National Bibliography of Mauritius; Bibliographie Nationale de L’Ile Maurice
Myanmar	None
New Zealand	New Zealand National Bibliography (Publications NZ)
Nigeria	National Bibliography of Nigeria
Norway	Norwegian National Bibliography
North Korea	None
North Macedonia	Macedonian Bibliography; Македонска библиографија
Panama	None
Poland	Polish National Bibliography; Polska Bibliografia Narodow
Quebec (Note: Quebec is a province of Canada.)	Quebec Bibliography; Bibliographie du Québec
Republic of the Congo	None
Russia	Russian National Bibliography; Rossiyskaya Natsional’naya Bibliografiya
Rwanda	None
Saudi Arabia	None
Seychelles	None
Serbia	Bibliography of Serbia; Bibliografija Srbije
Singapore	Singapore National Bibliography
Slovenia	Slovenian Bibliography; Slovenska bibliografija
Somalia	None
South Africa	South African National Bibliography (SANB)
South Korea	National Bibliography of Korea
Spain	Spanish Bibliography; Bibliografía Española
Sweden	Swedish National Bibliography
Switzerland	Swiss Book; Das Schweizer Buch; Le Livre Suisse; Il Libro svizzro Il Cudesch svizzer
Tajikistan	None
Thailand	Thai National Bibliography (TNB)
Togo	None
Turkey	Turkish Bibliography
Uganda	Uganda National Bibliography
United Kingdom	British National Bibliography (BNB)
Vietnam	Vietnamese National Bibliography
Yemen	None

== See also ==
- National Bibliography Number
- Universal Short Title Catalogue
