= Swiss Book =

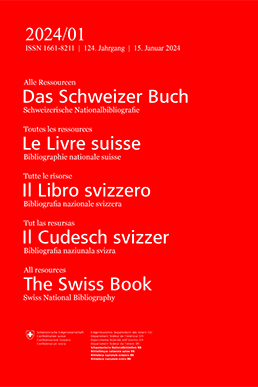
Cover of the Swiss Book, the Swiss National Bibliography

The Swiss Book is the National Bibliography of Switzerland and is compiled, edited and published by the Swiss National Library (NL). The Swiss Book indexes Swiss publishing output (commercial and non-commercial) – the Helvetica – published in print and/or electronic form in Switzerland and abroad, in accordance with the NL's acquisitions guidelines.

== Other names ==
- German: Das Schweizer Buch, Schweizerische Nationalbibliografie
- French: Le Livre suisse, Bibliographie nationale suisse
- Italian: Il Libro svizzero, Bibliografia nazionale svizzera
- Romansh: Il Cudesch svizzer, Bibliografia naziunala svizra

The Swiss Book consists of four series with different publication frequencies:

- All Resources (fortnightly): issues nos. 1-15 and 17-23
- Musical scores (annual): issue no. 16
- Doctoral dissertations (annual): issue no. 24
- Special issue (annual): issue no. 25

The bibliographic information published in the Swiss Book is compiled according to the international RDA cataloguing rules. The graphic presentation of bibliographic metadata is based on the international ISBD standard. The authorities included in the bibliographic records are compiled according to the GND standard. Bibliographic entries are sorted by subject according to the Dewey Decimal Classification System (DDC) and the DDC-subject categories of the DACH region.
