= Scriptorium (website) =

Newspaper archive website

- Website type: Online newspaper archive
- Available in: 2 languages
- List of languages French, English
- Country of origin: Switzerland
- Owner: Cantonal and University Library of Lausanne
- Website: scriptorium.ch
- Commercial: No
- Registration: Optional
- Launched: 7 December 2012
- Current status: Online

Scriptorium is the digital library of the Cantonal and University Library of Lausanne, part of the University of Lausanne in the Swiss canton of Vaud. It was launched on 7 December 2012 and initially included more than a million pages of digitized newspapers published in Vaud canton. All of the content is freely available to the public and the site allows full-text search through its entire collection.

== History ==
It was launched on 7 December 2012 by the Cantonal and University Library of Lausanne (BCU), part of the University of Lausanne in the Swiss canton of Vaud, and initially included more than a million pages of digitized newspapers published in Vaud canton. The initiative was done with the support of the Tamedia publishing group and the Swiss National Library, in an effort to preserve the history of the canton The first paper digitized was 24 heures and its predecessor paper Feuille d'avis de Lausanne.

In their annual report, BCU reported 2,973,638 visits to Scriptorium Digital Library for its first full year of availability (2013). As of 2022, there were 7.5 million pages in 120 titles.

== Features ==
All of the content is freely available to the public on the Scriptorium website. Scriptorium allows full-text search through its entire collection. The pages can be printed, sent by email or downloaded. Search can be done with keywords, dates or the specific publication.

== List of newspapers ==
Scriptorium includes the following digital collections:

- 24 heures
- Allez savoir!
- Almanach Balthasar
- Almanach de Chalamala
- L'ami de la vérité
- Annonces et avis divers
- L'Arbalète
- Le Bistouri
- La Bombe
- Le Bonjour de Jack Rollan
- La Broye Hebdo
- Le Canard libre
- La Cancoire
- Le Charivari
- Chut
- Le Clairon du Nord
- La Côte
- La Crecelle
- Croquis vaudois
- Domaine Public
- Le Droit du Peuple
- L'Echo
- L'Estafette
- Feuille d'avis de Lausanne
- Feuille d'avis de la Vallée de Joux
- Feuille périodique
- La Fronde
- Le Frondeur
- Le Grelot
- Gribouille et Redzipe
- La Griffe
- Le Grutléen
- La Guêpe
- L'Hebdo
- L'Illustré
- Journal de Charles Constant
- Journal helvétique
- Le Journal de Jack Rollan
- Le Kangourou
- La Lanterne de Petollion
- Lausanne-Soir
- La Marge
- Le Matin
- Mépris
- Mercure suisse
- Messager boiteux
- Le Moniteur
- Le Moustique
- Nouvelle revue
- Nouvelle revue de Lausanne
- Nouvelle revue de Lausanne et du Pays de Vaud
- Nouvelle revue et journal politique
- Nouvelle revue hebdo
- Nouvelliste suisse
- Le nouvelliste vaudois
- Nouvelliste vaudois
- Nouvelliste vaudois et journal national suisse
- Le Passe-Temps
- Le Père Jérôme
- La petite revue
- La Pomme
- Presse Lausannoise
- La Presse Riviera-Chablais
- Propos vaudois
- Le Régional
- La revue
- La revue agricole
- La revue de Lausanne
- La revue du dimanche
- Le Semeur
- Tribune de Lausanne - Le Matin
- Tribune de Lausanne et Estafette
- TV8
- UNI Lausanne
- Uniscope

== See also ==
- e-newspaperarchives.ch
