= National Digital Newspaper Program =

American newspaper archive

The National Digital Newspaper Program is a joint project between the National Endowment for the Humanities and the Library of Congress to create and maintain a publicly available, online digital archive of historically significant newspapers published in the United States between 1836 and 1922. Additionally, the program will make available bibliographic records and holdings information for some 140,000 newspaper titles from the 17th century to the present. Further, it will include scope notes and encyclopedia-style entries discussing the historical significance of specific newspapers. Added content will also include contextually relevant historical information. "One organization within each U.S. state or territory will receive an award to collaborate with relevant state partners in this effort."

In March 2007 more than 226,000 pages of newspapers from California, Florida, Kentucky, New York, Utah, Virginia and the District of Columbia published between 1900 and 1910 were put online at a fully searchable site called "Chronicling America." As of December 2007, the total number of pages was about 413,000. They reached 1 million page mark in 2009. As of April 2026, the site reports nearly 24 million pages.

Funding through the National Endowment for the Humanities is carried out through their "We The People" initiative.

== Purpose ==
This project dovetails with the United States Newspaper Program which was a massive project to microfilm newspaper collections. The initiators of that earlier project asserted that the intellectual content of newspapers serves an important role for researchers as it is for all intents and purposes the first draft of history. Newspapers also provide unique access to "diverse geographic viewpoints at the community level." Problematically, since the middle of the 19th century this "first draft" has been recorded on poor quality newsprint which is decaying rapidly. This digitization project's purpose is to continue preserving newspaper and newspaper collections while addressing the inadequacies of the prior program. Through digitization, it is more likely that images will be copied with fidelity and that the records will be more richly searchable. This latter point is huge as newspapers traditionally posed a research challenge due to density of text and inadequate cataloging of content.

== History ==
On March 31, 2004, Bruce Cole, the directory of the NEH, and James Billington, the Librarian of Congress, signed an agreement creating the National Digital Newspaper Program. The NDNP follows in the footsteps of the successful United States Newspaper Program, a several-decade effort to catalog and microfilm the bulk of America's historic newspapers. The program is broken down into two phases. Each successive phase will both increase the scope of the program and refine the requirements for data collection.

=== Phase 1 ===
In July 2004 the award guidelines were issued. Applications were due in October and awardees were announced the following March. The first phase took newspapers from a small subset of the states, limited to 1900 through 1910. After using this phase to improve technical requirements and specifications, the program was opened to other awardees in Phase 2.

The awardees for Phase 1 are:

- University of California, Riverside
- University of Florida Libraries, Gainesville
- University of Kentucky Libraries, Lexington
- New York Public Library, New York City
- University of Utah, Salt Lake City
- Library of Virginia, Richmond

The General-access Phase 1 website prototype was implemented in March 2007 and that May it was announced that phase 1 was completed.

=== Phase 2 ===
Phase 2 of NDNP expanded grants to an additional group of institutions. Awards granted in 2007 and 2008 included the following institutions:

- Arizona State Library, Archives and Records Management
- University of Hawaii
- Minnesota Historical Society
- University of Nebraska–Lincoln
- University of North Texas
- Ohio Historical Society, Columbus
- Pennsylvania State University
- State Historical Society of Missouri
- Washington State Library

== Program technology ==
Participants must follow the technical guidelines laid out in a 64-page PDF. The technology for the NDNP digital repository is being built using largely open source software, including:

- Apache Cocoon
- Apache Lucene
- Gentoo Linux
- Fedora

Digital objects are stored in .TIFF 6.0, .JPEG 2000, and .PDF formats. Metadata is provided in the METS/MODS version of XML and XML provides the basis for larger hierarchical structures as well.

== Alternatives ==
The scanning efforts of the government entity have been dwarfed by newspapers.com and newspaperarchive.com which as of March 2018 claim to each have scanned more than 350 million pages. Publishers, libraries and historical organizations find the private sector faster, less complicated and cheaper than the National Digital Newspaper Program. Both private organizations charge readers to read, but do not charge publishers to scan items.

== See also ==
- United States Newspaper Program
- Trove (Australian newspapers c. 1800–1955, a few later)
