= The Cairo Bulletin =

Illinois Newspaper

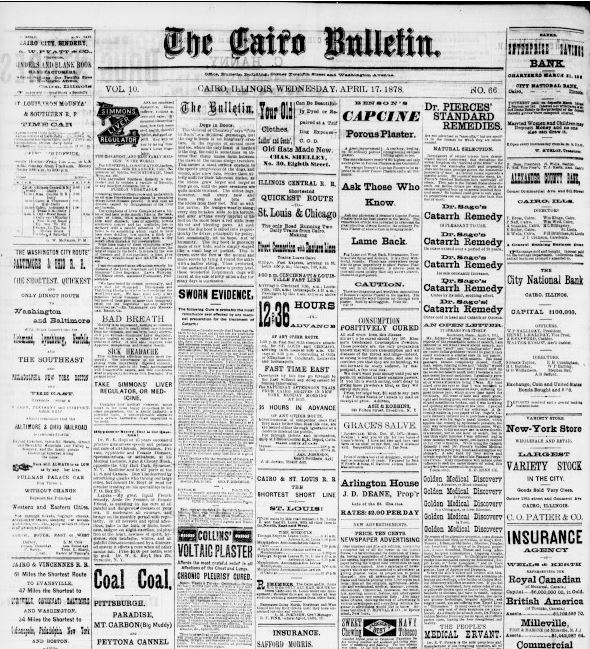
- Type: Daily newspaper
- Owner(s): Jim H. Oberly & Company
- Founded: 1872
- Headquarters: 225 Washington Ave. Democrat Hall, Cairo, Illinois

The Cairo Bulletin began publication in Cairo, Illinois, on December 21, 1868. Founded by John H. Oberly and Company (as the Cairo Evening Bulletin), it was one of only a few newspapers being published in Southern Illinois during its early run. Oberly meant for the newspaper to be “a new organ of Democratic sentiment,” and covered news, politics, and literature for the whole area.

The Cairo Bulletin has had several name changes during its long run, and later became The Cairo Citizen. It ceased publication in 2020.

Issues for years 1868-1884 have been digitized and are available for free online at Chronicling America and the Illinois Digital Newspaper Collections.
