= BAnQ numérique =

Canadian web portal

- Website type: Digital library
- Available in: French
- Country of origin: Canada
- Owner: Bibliothèque et Archives nationales du Québec
- Website: numerique.banq.qc.ca
- Commercial: No
- Registration: Optional
- Launched: October 2015
- Current status: Online

BAnQ numérique is the digital portal of the Bibliothèque et Archives nationales du Québec (BAnQ), the library and archives of the Quebec province in Canada. It was launched in October 2015, following the previous digitization initiatives of BAnQ with additional funding from the Quebec Ministry of Culture. It provides access to the digitized resources of BAnQ, including its newspaper collection, as well as books.

== History ==
The Bibliothèque et Archives nationales du Québec are the library and archives of the Canadian province of Quebec, established in 2005. The digitization program began in 2003; early digitized titles included the papers La Minerve, La Patrie and Le Petit Journal. As of 2015, BAnQ, which had nearly 6000 papers in their collection, had digitized 248.

Following the adoption of the Plan culturel numérique du Québec in September 2014, BAnQ increased its efforts to offer its services online with a 5.25 million grant from the Quebec Ministry of Culture. The BAnQ numérique portal was created to assist in ease of access to its collection, aimed to be more user friendly than previous offerings. The director of the archives described her goal with the project, saying: "I dream of a digital BAnQ, a great cathedral of digital knowledge, like Gallica but more advanced."

The platform was officially launched in October 2015. As of April 2019 it averaged 9,879 sessions a day; during the COVID-19 pandemic, visits to the site increased by 45%.

== Features ==
BAnQ numérique collects and standardizes access to all of BAnQ's digitized services, including its digitized archives. In 2015, this included 3 million documents, and 11 million pages of digitized material. In digitizing its notary archives, they collaborated with genealogy companies Ancestry.com and FamilySearch. It was proposed that the public be allowed to edit the optical character recognition data, to correct errors that come from the automatic process. In spring 2019, it began to utilize Creative Commons licenses and other to inform its users of the licensing requirements on works, following the identification of many puiblic domain works in its collection; this followed the release of 100,000 of its digitized documents into the public domain.

In offering access to old newspapers they have reached copyright agreements with their publishers. In digitizing one paper, La Terre de chez nous, it took 210 hours to digitize 155,000 pages, though in that case the paper had already been transferred to microfilm, which is easier to digitize. Newspapers have optical character recognition, which allows for keyword searching. In deciding what newspapers to prioritize inclusion of in the archives, considered factors are how many users have requested its inclusion and its historical and regional importance. The portal can be used to borrow books as well as read digitized papers. Borrowing books from the BAnQ numérique is done through a third party service, Pretnumerique.ca, a service which formed out of a collaboration between BAnQ and several other organizations. All periodical data is stored on a BAnQ server.
