= E-newspaperarchives.ch =

Online Swiss newspaper archive

e-newspaperarchives.ch

- Home page of the site on 11 July 2024.
- Website type: Online newspaper archive
- Available in: 4 languages
- List of languages English, German, French, Italian
- Predecessor: Swiss Press Online
- Country of origin: Switzerland
- Owner: Swiss National Library
- Website: www.e-newspaperarchives.ch
- Commercial: No
- Registration: Optional (necessary for clippings)
- Launched: 2011 (Swiss Press Online); 2018 (e-newspaperarchives.ch)
- Current status: Online

e-newspaperarchives.ch (or e-npa.ch) is a website run by the Swiss National Library which provides free digitized archives of many Swiss newspapers. It is the successor to the Swiss Press Online site started in 2011, which it succeeded in 2018. As of 2026, it provides access to 221 Swiss newspapers in several languages.

== History ==
The Swiss National Library created its initial digitization strategy in 2009, in which it prioritized newspapers and the press. Their recommendations include respect for copyright and partnering with related institutions. Swiss Press Online was launched on 28 September 2011 by the Swiss National Library and Valais Médiathèque, due to a desire by several cantonal institutions to digitize and pool their newspaper resources. It was launched on the day that the digitized version of the Confedédéré publication was released, which was the service's pilot project. Soon after this several other institutions joined their archives to the project.

In 2017 the service's collaborators wished to make changes to improve the quality of the service: the site's name was changed to e-newspaperarchives.ch and it was moved to a newer technology called Viridian. All publications on the former service are still accessible through its successor.

Its scanning processes are carried out by the company 4DigitalBooks, and digitization is done in collaboration with other libraries. In November 2019, the library organized a cooperation with the public to fix text scanning errors in the archive introduced by the automated character recognition software. This cooperation was themed around women's suffrage, due to it taking place near the 60th anniversary of the referendum on the issue.

== Features ==
Newspapers digitized by the site are accessible through full-text search in addition to a calendar that shows specific dates for the newspaper. Users can create individual clippings and archives, and pages can be downloaded as PDFs, or printed. It incorporates a statistics tool for tracking frequency of words in the scanned newspapers over time, as well as keyword searching. The site differs from its past iteration in that its text scans are able to be corrected by the public, it is segmented on an article by article basis (for new scans, older scans keep their segmentation level) and incorporates more search and metadata options. An upgrade to increase the segmentation of older paper scans is planned for 2025.

As of 2026, it provides access to 221 Swiss newspapers in several languages. Specific newspapers whose archives exist on the site include Der Bund, Neue Zürcher Zeitung, L'Express/L'Impartial, and Le Nouvelliste. Newer editions of digitized newspapers are not immediately accessible through the site, instead being accessible through their respective publishers, though they are digitized soon after publication. The oldest digitized newspaper is the 2 January 1692 issue of the Gazette de Berne. There are few Italian-language newspapers in the archive, and those that are included in the archive are mostly from the Grisons. Most newspapers from the Italian-speaking Canton of Ticino were instead digitized for the Archivio digitale Sbt dei Quotidiani e Periodici.

== See also ==
- Scriptorium
