= Joliet Signal =

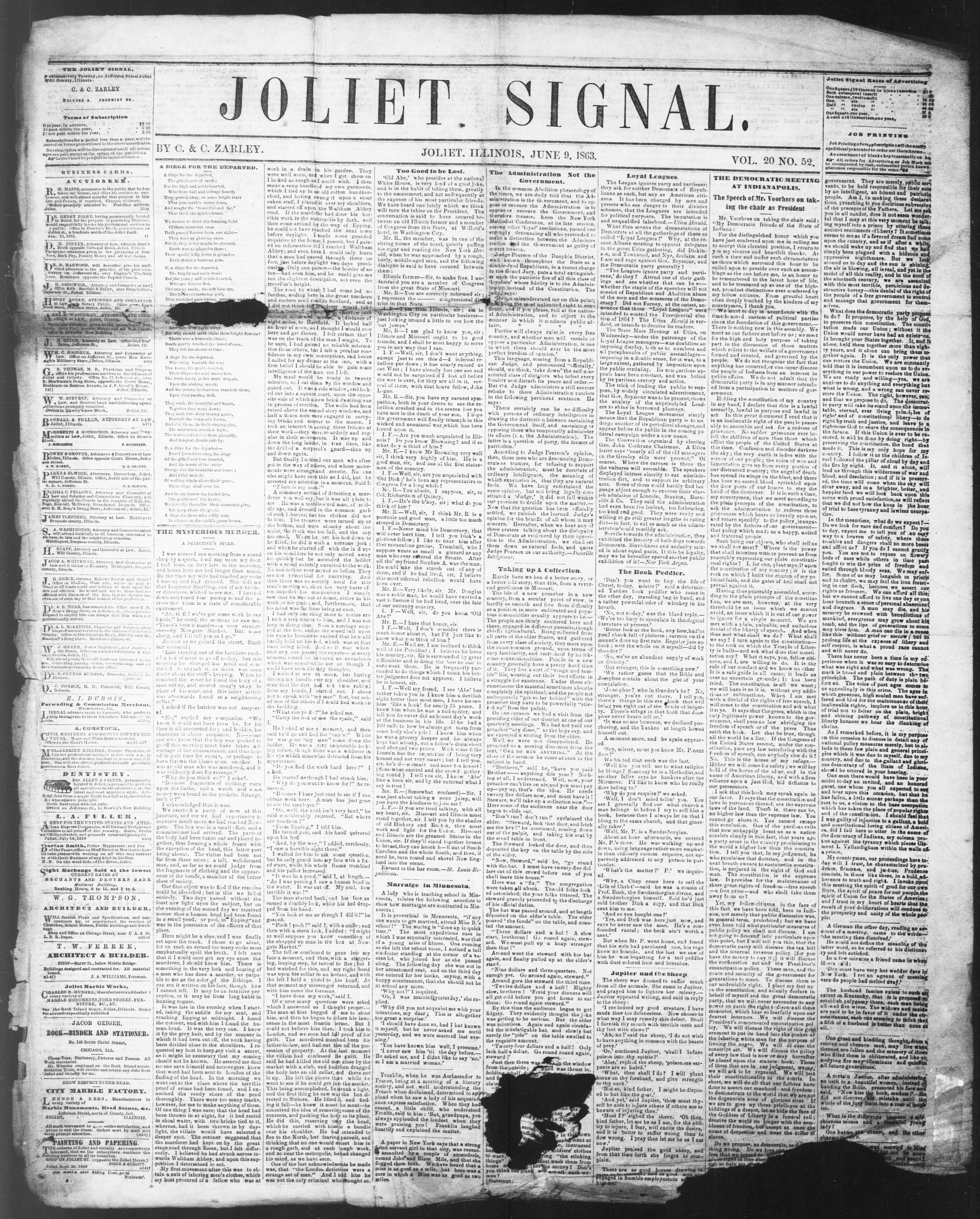
- Type: Weekly newspaper
- Format: Broadsheet
- Owner(s): C & C Zarley
- Founded: 1843
- Language: American English
- Headquarters: Chicago St., Joliet, Illinois
- City: Joliet
- Country: United States
- ISSN: 2575-0933
- OCLC number: 10489466

The Joliet Signal was a weekly, local newspaper which began publication in Joliet, Illinois, in 1844. This newspaper's title and publishers changed several times before finally being bought by Judge S. W. Randall and renamed the Juliet Signal. When, in 1845, local residents changed the spelling of Juliet, Ill. to Joliet, Randall changed the Juliet Signal's name to Joliet Signal.

The last known issue of the Signal is dated April 7, 1893.
