= Cantonal and University Library of Lausanne =

Library in Vaud, Switzerland

Coordinates: 46.5228°N 6.5795°E

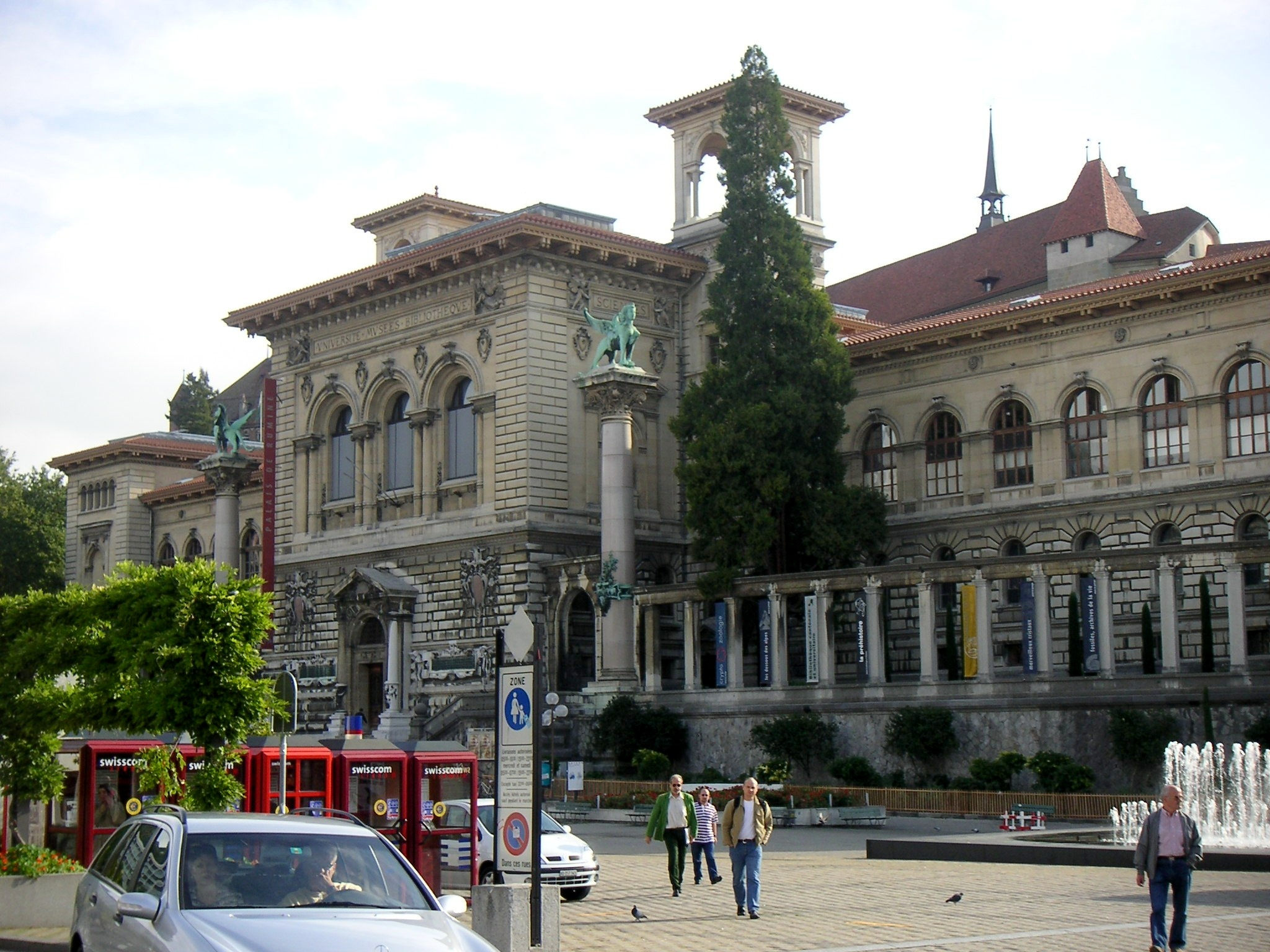
The Palais de Rumine, one of the five sites of the Cantonal and University Library of Lausanne

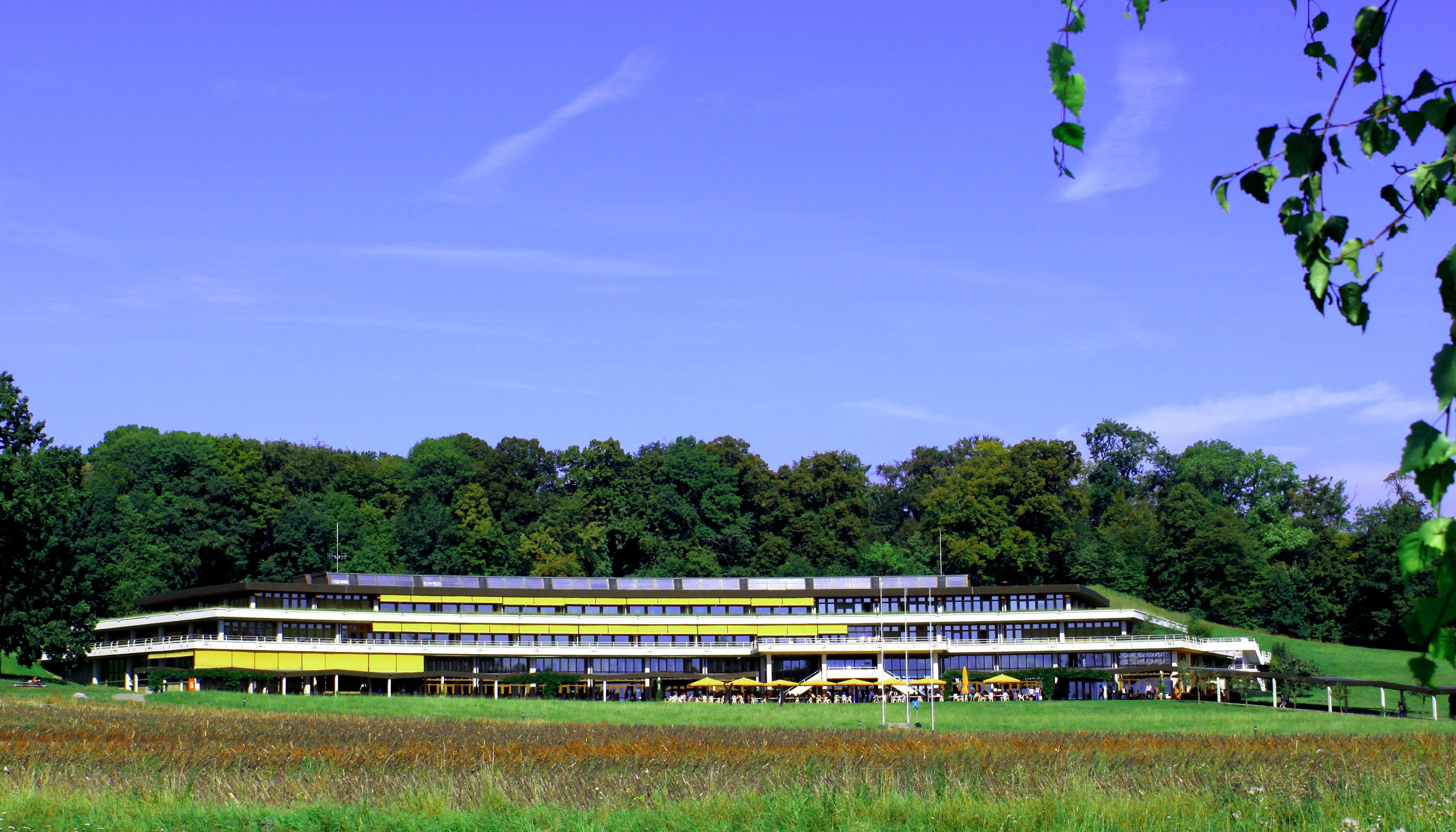
One of the sites of the Library on the campus of the University of Lausanne

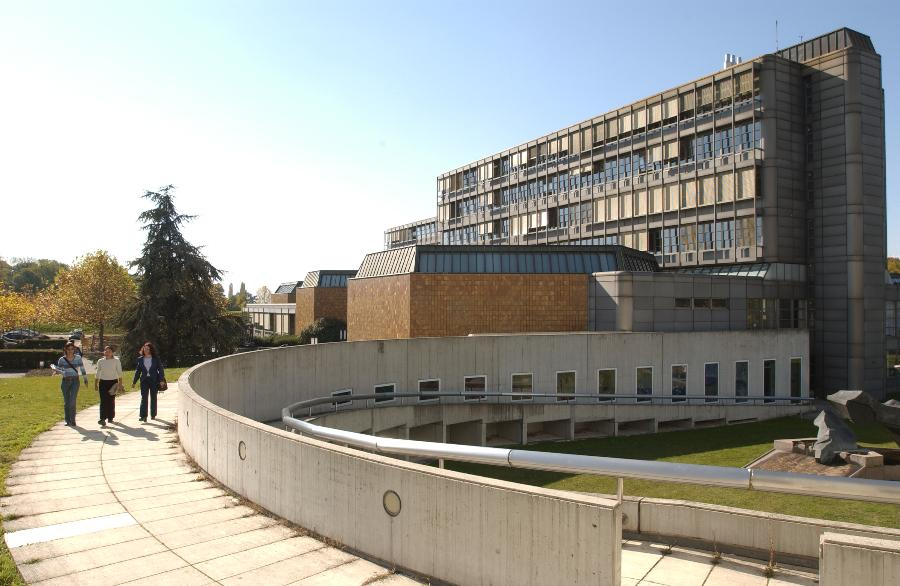
One of the sites of the Library on the campus of the University of Lausanne

The Cantonal and University Library of Lausanne (Bibliothèque cantonale et universitaire de Lausanne, BCU) was founded in the 16th century and became one of the most important public libraries in Switzerland.

== History ==
The University of Lausanne was founded in 1537; and the library collection has evolved over the centuries to meet the changing needs of the institution's seven faculties—theology, law, arts, social and political science, business and economics, science and medicine.

In 1982, the university's central administration and the Cantonal and University Library (BCU) were installed at Dorigny.

== See also ==
- EPFL Learning Center
- Lausanne campus
- Scriptorium
