= John Darrell Sherwood =

American author (born 1966)

- Education: Columbia University (BA); George Washington University (PhD)
- Alma mater: Milton Academy
- Occupation: historian
- Writing career
- Period: 20th century
- Genres: Military history, Naval history, African-American History
- Subjects: Korean War, Vietnam War

John Darrell Sherwood (born 1966) is an American author who has published five books and numerous articles. He specializes in military history, but has also published articles on travel and skiing. He has been with the Naval History and Heritage Command since 1997.

== Education ==
Sherwood graduated from Milton Academy in 1985, and received his B.A. from Columbia University and Ph.D. from George Washington University. He was a Fulbright scholar to Germany and Greece in 2019.

== Officers in Flight Suits ==
His first book, Officers in Flights Suits: The Story of American Air Force Fighter Pilots in the Korean War (1996), examines the personal wartime experiences of U.S. Air Force fighter pilots in the Korean War. In 1996, it was selected to be on the Air Force Chief of Staff's professional reading list.

== Fast Movers ==
His second history, Fast Movers: Jet Pilots and the Vietnam Experience (1999), focuses on U.S. Air Force, U.S. Navy, and U.S. Marine Corps fighter pilots who fought in the Vietnam War. Like Officers in Flights Suits, it is a social history that focuses on individual combat experiences and the institutional cultures of the fighter pilots who fought in America's longest war. The U.S. Naval Institute chose it as a notable book of 1999.

== Afterburner ==
Afterburner: Naval Aviators and the Vietnam War (2004) is the first book published by Sherwood as an official historian at the U.S. Naval Historical Center. As a consequence, he collects no royalties for the project. The book combines traditional operational history with social history to tell the story of U.S. Navy air power during the latter stages of the Vietnam War, 1968-1972. As such, it covers the American bombing campaign in Laos, Operation Linebacker, and Operation Pocket Money (the U.S. Navy's 1972 aerial mining operations against North Vietnam). It also provides in-depth portraits of 21 naval aviators who fought in Vietnam. The book received honorable mention for the North American Society for Oceanic History's John Lyman Book Award in 2004.

== Black Sailor, White Navy ==
Sherwood's latest book, Black Sailor, White Navy: Racial Unrest in the United States Navy During the Vietnam War Era (2007), examines racial unrest in the Navy during the early 1970s. In particular, it tells the story of the race riots that occurred on the USS Kitty Hawk (CV-63) and the USS Hassayampa (AO-145), as well as a sit-down strike and protest on USS Constellation (CV-64). The book also explores a variety of other, less well-known riots, and the Navy's efforts, under Admiral Elmo Zumwalt to improve the racial climate in the U.S. Navy.

== Ongoing Research and Future Projects ==
His latest book, War in the Shallows: U.S. Navy Coastal and Riverine Warfare in Vietnam, 1965-1968, published in 2015, looks at the brownwater navy in the Vietnam War—the sailors who fought on the rivers and coastal areas of South Vietnam.

== Other writing activity ==
In addition to his professional work, Sherwood is a columnist for DCSki.com, a web site devoted to skiing in the Mid-Atlantic States, and has written ski and travel related articles for a variety of publications, including The Financial Times, The Slovak Spectator, and The Ski-Europe Report.

== Select bibliography ==
- War in the Shallows: U.S. Navy Coastal and Riverine Warfare in Vietnam, 1965-1968 (2015), ISBN 9780945274766
- Black Sailor, White Navy: Racial Unrest in the Fleet during the Vietnam War Era (2007), ISBN 0-8147-4036-7.
- Afterburner: Naval Aviators and the Vietnam War (2004), ISBN 0-8147-9842-X.
- Fast Movers: Jet Pilots and the Vietnam Experience (1999), ISBN 0-684-84784-1.
- Nixon's Trident: Naval Power in Southeast Asia, 1968-1972 (2009), ISBN 978-0-945274-58-2.
- Officers in Flights Suits: The Story of American Air Force Fighter Pilots in the Korean War (1996), ISBN 0-8147-8038-5.
