= Heritage Microfilm =

Microfilm digitization business based in Cedar Rapids, Iowa

Heritage Microfilm, Inc.
- Founded: 1997
- Founders: Cristopher Gill
- Headquarters: Cedar Rapids, Iowa

Heritage Microfilm, Inc. (est. 1997) is a preservation microfilm and microfilm digitization business located in Cedar Rapids, Iowa.

== History ==
The company began in 1996 when the microfilm division of Cedar Rapids-based Crest Information Technologies was sold to Christopher Gill. The microfilm division was responsible at the time for preserving newspapers and for microfilming business documents. The business document filming portion of the business was soon dropped in favor of the newspaper microfilming division. Crest in 1999 sold the remaining portion of the company to Lason.

In 1999, Heritage Microfilm began digitizing newspaper microfilm and launched NewspaperArchive. Soon after, it began creating smaller "branded" newspaper archive websites in collaboration with publishing partners.

The firm works with ANSI/AIIM standards for preservation microfilming. It has a humidity and temperature-controlled storage facility. It is a Kodak ImageGuard facility. One of its specializations is damaged microfilm recovery. It has an Extek 3441 microfilm duplicator, which duplicates at low speeds to prevent damage to Redox or Vinegar-Syndrome microfilm. It uses Kodak silver halide microfilm for master film and primary duplications. It discontinued the use of vesicular film for duplications, due to the poor quality film available from distributors. It claims to use Kodak BrownToner, a polysulfide film treatment, on every reel of silver-halide microfilm that they produce.

== NewspaperArchive ==
NewspaperArchive is a commercial online database of digitized newspapers launched in 1999 by Heritage Microfilm, which claims to be the world's largest newspaper archive.

== Criticism ==
In a 2005 Association of College and Research Libraries paper, Bernard F. Reilly, Jr. expressed concern about the extent of Heritage Microfilm's involvement with stewardship of historical resources otherwise assumed to be held in the public trust. Reilly wrote, "until 2002, the Library of Congress and the Center for Research Libraries regularly microfilmed the principal daily newspaper of Jamaica, The Gleaner. In 2002 the Gleaner Publishing Company executed an agreement with Heritage Microfilm, Inc. giving to the for-profit firm exclusive rights to reformat and distribute The Gleaner, in both microform and digital format. Because Heritage now holds exclusive digital rights the agreement effectively shifts control of back files to the commercial sector, where it is marketed primarily for genealogists and family history researchers."

== See also ==
- Microdot
- Microphotograph
- Microprinting
- Newspapers.com
