= R. J. Huggins =

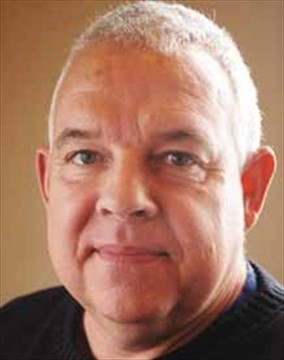
- Born: June 4, 1958 (age 68); North York, Ontario, Canada
- Education: University of Waterloo
- Occupations: Entrepreneur; Director; Producer; Writer; Filmmaker
- Notable work: The Greatest Freedom Show on Earth
- Spouse: Mary Ellen Dempster
- Children: 1
- Website: Official website

R. J. (Bob) Huggins (born June 4, 1958) is a Canadian entrepreneur, director, producer, writer, and documentary filmmaker. He is best known for founding PaperofRecord.com, a comprehensive database of searchable newspaper image documents published in their original form. The company was sold to Google in 2006, and became an integral part of the Google News Archive.

Huggins has since pursued innovation projects in technology, mentorship, publishing, and documentary filmmaking.

== Newspaper digitization ==
In 1999, Huggins founded Cold North Wind, Inc., the parent company of PaperofRecord.com. PaperofRecord.com became the first company in the world to digitize over 21 million archived newspaper images from publications in Canada, United States, Mexico and Europe. The PaperofRecord database offered its users the unique ability to view its newspaper archives in their original published format, and search the entire contents of each page, down to a single word. Canada's two largest newspapers, The Globe and Mail and the Toronto Star, were the first to participate in this process, with their archives being fully digitized and accessible to PaperofRecord subscribers by 2002.

The response to the PaperofRecord project was overwhelmingly positive, with economic historian Richard Salvucci describing the site as "simply essential for historians working on the history of Mexico." In 2012, the Canadian Baseball Network named Huggins one of the "Most Influential Canadians in Baseball," commending his work in archiving the entirety of The Sporting News as part of the PaperofRecord project.

The PaperofRecord.com collection was acquired in 'secret' in 2006 by Google and announced publicly in 2008. Huggins described the decision as "bittersweet," expressing disappointment that the Canadian government was not able to invest adequate resources into the project, while also attesting that "without the help and vision of a company such as Google, this immense, global, educational resource would not be possible on the scale that is being contemplated."

In his other involvement with newspaper digitization, Huggins was a founding member of The Globe and Mail's electronic information service team, Info Globe. He helped implement electronic “as of release” documents for Finance Canada and negotiated Soviet commercial electronic rights from Novosti Press Agency of the first commercial statistical trade information to the West for the New York Times Information Services.

== Entrepreneurial work ==
Huggins has more than 25 years experience as a professional and entrepreneurial pioneer in the newspaper publishing, web/content publishing and high technology sectors. His publication, This Country Canada, received the Silver and Honorable Mention Awards at the Eighteenth National Magazine Awards in the Photojournalism and Words and Pictures categories respectively.

In 2002, Huggins was nominated as Canadian Entrepreneur of the Year by Ernst & Young. He was the Entrepreneur in Residence (EIR) for Ottawa Centre for Research and Innovation and for Invest Ottawa between 2009 and 2014. During his residency, Huggins worked with over 300 start-ups, helping emerging to refine their strategy and go-to-market positioning.

== Personal life ==
Huggins attended the University of Waterloo, receiving a degree in Canadian Studies, Economics and History in 1981. He currently lives with his family in Ottawa, Canada.

== Orphan Boy Films ==
In 2006, Huggins founded Orphan Boy Films, a production company specializing in historical feature documentaries. The name is an homage to Huggins' father, a Barnardo orphan who was sent to Canada as a twelve-year-old to work on a farm outside the village of Norwich, in Southwestern Ontario.

In 2015, Orphan Boy Films released The Greatest Freedom Show on Earth, a feature-length documentary commissioned by TVO.org. Cinematographer and Producer Anthony Seck played a key role in the collaboration. The documentary explored the story behind the Emancipation Day celebrations in Windsor, Ontario from 1932-1967. The annual event, soon to be coined "The Greatest Freedom Show on Earth," was first instigated by Windsorite Walter Perry in August 1932, and continued until his death in 1968. Though Perry's death had a significant influence on the end of the tradition, the Detroit Riot of 1967 was also believed to have been a major reason behind its demise.

The documentary aired on TVOntario on February 25, 2018, and made its PBS Detroit debut on May 4, 2018. It was also shown at some small screenings in Ottawa, and had a large theatre debut to over 600 students across two screenings at the Capitol Theatre in Windsor. It won the "Award of Merit - Special Mention" at the Impact Doc Awards in January 2016.

Orphan Boy Films is currently developing their next film, A Barnardo Boy, an episodic docu-drama exploring the experiences of the Home Children sent to Canada between 1969 and 1930, particularly those children who came from Britain to Canada as a ward of Thomas John Barnardo in 1930.

== Filmography ==
| Year | Film | Credited as | Notes |
|---|---|---|---|
| 2015 | The Greatest Freedom Show on Earth | Director | Documentary Feature |

== Awards ==
| Year | Nominated work | Awards | Category | Result |
|---|---|---|---|---|
| 2016 | The Greatest Freedom Show on Earth | Award of Merit | Special Mention | Won |
