= Cairo Evening Times =

Local newspaper in Illinois, US (1865–1866)

Cairo Evening Times was a daily newspaper published out of Cairo, Illinois in 1865-1866. It was preceded by The War Eagle, a newspaper published from 1864-1865 first by Major Caffrey and then the Goodall Brothers. It was published as a wartime newspaper with a Republican slant. The War Eagle, originally published out of Columbus, Kentucky, was moved by H.L. Goodall to Cairo in 1864.

During its publication, The War Eagle attracted a wide influence, and Goodall was encouraged to broaden his operation. Out of the expansion came the Cairo Evening Times. Instead of the weekly publication used by War Eagle, the Cairo Evening Times began daily circulation in 1865, and even had a short run as a semi-daily. Goodall also published a tri-weekly edition titled Cairo Tri-Weekly Times, which also ceased publication in 1866.

While the Cairo Evening Times was still considered a Republican slanting paper, it was not as politically fiery as its predecessor.

The Cairo Evening Times ceased publication 1866, when it was absorbed by the Cairo Democrat. It is not known when the merger took place, but the last known issue of this newspaper is dated April 7, 1866.

Issues for years 1865-1866 have been digitized and are available for free online at Chronicling America.
