= The Ottawa Free Trader =

Weekly newspaper in Ottawa, Illinois

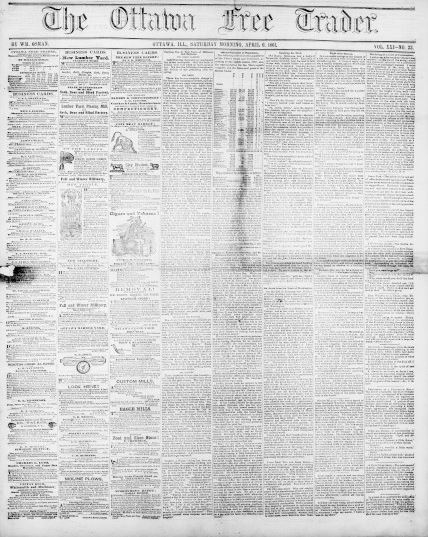
- Type: Weekly newspaper
- Format: Broadsheet
- Owner(s): William Osman
- Founded: 1843
- Ceased publication: 1916
- Headquarters: Rooms over Post Office at the Corner of Madison and Columbus, Ottawa, Illinois

The Ottawa Free Trader was a weekly newspaper published in Ottawa, Illinois, from 1843 to 1916. It changed publishers several times during its run, but was most closely associated with William Osman.

Alonzo Delano was one of the Free Trader's most distinguished contributors. Between 1849 and 1852, during his travels to California with the 49ers, Delano sent travel journals to Osman colorfully describing his many adventures.

The Ottawa Free Trader ceased publication in 1916. The latest known issue is dated December 25, 1914.
