= United States Newspaper Program =

American newspaper preservation initiative

The United States Newspaper Program (USNP) is a national effort among the individual states and the US federal government to locate, catalog, and preserve on microfilm, newspapers published in the United States up to the present time. Funding is provided by the National Endowment for the Humanities, and technical assistance is provided by the Library of Congress. The program has since been enhanced by the National Digital Newspaper Program. The program began in 1982 and was estimated to be completed in 2007. As of 2004, $51.1 million in federal and $19.3 million in state funding had been raised.

== Purpose ==
The initiators of the project asserted that the intellectual content of newspapers serves an important role for researchers as it is for all intents and purposes the first draft of history. Newspapers also provide unique access to "diverse geographic viewpoints at the community level." Problematically, since the middle of the 19th century this "first draft" has been recorded on poor quality newsprint which is decaying rapidly. Through microfilming the intellectual content, the National Endowment for the Humanities and the Library of Congress hoped to preserve it and improve accessibility.

== Scope ==
The U.S. Newspaper Program has supported (and continues to support) projects in all fifty states, the District of Columbia, Puerto Rico, and the U.S. Virgin Islands. Each project is conducted by a single organization or agency within a state or territory, usually the state's largest newspaper repository. Holdings from a large variety of repositories are catalogued. This includes public libraries, county courthouses, newspaper offices, historical museums, college and university libraries, archives, and historical societies. In addition to these state projects, the United States Newspaper Program funded cataloging of newspapers at eight national repositories one of which also received funding for preservation. Records are entered into a national database maintained at the Online Computer Library Center (OCLC) "and accessible through more than 53,500 dedicated computer terminals worldwide. Microfilm copies of newspapers are available to researchers anywhere in the country through the inter-library loan program."

== Standards ==
It is imperative that the program create microfilmed surrogates that "maintain the integrity and authenticity of the representation of the original document." Anything less could potentially result in the destruction of history. As such, in order to participate in the U.S. Newspaper Program, institutions must agree to adhere to an array of stringent standards. The standards for both microfilming and preservation were largely set by the Library of Congress.

== Criticism ==
The most outspoken critic of the United States Newspaper Program is the author Nicholson Baker. Baker argues that the microfilming done for this project is ineffectual because it cannot capture all information (i.e. color illustrations) and mistakes were made in filming that obfuscate what content there is. In his opinion this problem is compounded by the fact that newspapers were often thrown away or sold after they had been filmed. Baker makes his case in the book Double Fold: Libraries and the Assault on Paper and a The New Yorker article entitled Deadline: the author's desperate bid to save America's past. Baker felt so strongly about this he ended up buying as many newspapers as he could and starting the American Newspaper Repository.
