= PaperofRecord.com =

Canadian news website

PaperofRecord.com (POR) is a Canadian website that hosts digitized newspapers online. Cold North Wind Inc. is the parent company of Paperofrecord.com, which was founded by R. J. Huggins of Ottawa, Ontario in 2001.

== History ==
Cold North Wind, Inc. (CNW) was created in 1999 to digitize archived newspapers and place them online for use by libraries and consumers. The site is accessible by fee-paying members, and contains over 21 million archived newspaper images from several countries.

The idea for the site was conceived in 2001 at a Mexican restaurant in Ottawa by R.J. (Bob) Huggins and others at Cold North Wind. The site carriers digitized newspapers from the United States, Mexico and Europe, including newspapers from cities and small towns.

The company digitized microfilm newspaper article images, for online access from a computer, and eventually automated the process. Cold North Wind asserts that it was the first company in the world to digitize an entire newspaper's history, beginning with the Toronto Star and its 110-year collection of back issues, which the company says was "archived in less than four months". Following this, the same process was used to archive The Globe and Mail.

In 2006 Google along with the shareholders of Cold North Wind, Inc. reached an agreement to privately sell POR to Google. The sale remained confidential until 2008 when the news was then publicly announced. The sale was seen as a positive step for POR due to Google's large scale and resources. Google News offers a news archive search independently; however, the addition of the archived material found on POR broadened the scope of their archives.

== Features ==
CNW worked with the National Archives of Canada and created an online archive featuring portions of former prime minister William Lyon Mackenzie King's diaries, as well as working toward an online version of the Canadian Historical Dictionary.

Genealogy is one of the applied uses of POR, as are sports media and author publication. Books such as The 50 Greatest Red Sox Games, Opening Day: The story of Jackie Robinson’s First Season feature references to POR.

Books such as the Reference sources in history: An introductory guide, Chocolate: history, culture, and heritage, Ontario’s African-Canadian heritage: collected writings by Fred Landon, 1918–1967 use the site as primary sources for historical and genealogical purposes.

The Washington Star, which has been out of circulation since 1981 ending its 130-year-long run, has also now been archived on POR. The Washington Star covered major events in American history including the Civil War and both World Wars.

CNW and POR were nationally recognized in 2002 with a national E-content award.
