= Chronicling America =

Newspaper archive

- Producer: National Digital Newspaper Program (United States)
- History: 2007–present
- Languages: English, Spanish, German, Polish, Czech, Lithuanian, Russian, Bulgarian (non-exhaustive list)

Access
- Cost: Free

Coverage
- Format coverage: Newspapers
- Temporal coverage: 1690–1963
- Geospatial coverage: The United States and its territories

Links
- Website: Official Webpage
- Title list(s): www.loc.gov/collections/directory-of-us-newspapers-in-american-libraries/

Chronicling America is an open access, open source newspaper database and companion website. It is produced by the United States National Digital Newspaper Program (NDNP), a partnership between the Library of Congress and the National Endowment for the Humanities. The NDNP was founded in 2005. The Chronicling America website was publicly launched in March 2007. It is hosted by the Library of Congress. Much of the content hosted on Chronicling America is in the public domain.

The database is searchable by key terms, state, language, time period, or newspaper. The Chronicling America website contains digitized newspaper pages and information about historic newspapers to place the primary sources in context and support future research. It hosts newspapers written in a variety of languages. In selecting newspapers to digitize, the site relies on the discretion of contributing institutions.

The project describes itself as a "long-term effort to develop an Internet-based, searchable database of U.S. newspapers with descriptive information and select digitization of historic pages." Local participants in the project receive two-year grants to scan approximately 100,000 newspaper pages, primarily from microfilm. For newspapers that are not digitized, the website directs users to library locations that are known to have the desired records available.

== History ==
The first series of newspaper digitization was completed with input from universities in 2007, and included public domain entries from six states and the District of Columbia. The site was launched for public use In March 2007.

In June 2009, the site added support for Web crawlers and API. In May 2011, the site added tools to share its digitized content on social media. As of 2012, Chronicling America had over 5.2 million individual newspaper pages available for viewing and/or downloading, representing 801 titles from 32 states; though the project initially targeted newspapers from the 1900-1910 period, it had gradually expanded so that papers scanned currently span the years 1836-1922. Papers from 4 additional states (Iowa, Maryland, Michigan, and North Carolina) were then slated to be added to the collection, and grant-funded projects to scan papers from these states were then underway so that the material could be added to the site in 2013.

By 2014, the website hosted digital newspaper records from thirty-six states. By October 2015, that number had risen to thirty-eight, and it had digitized over 10 million pages. As of 2016, the database had expanded its coverage to include content ranging from 1690 to 1963. Geographically, its coverage had then expanded to 48 states and 2 United States territories. As of April 2026, the site reports nearly 24 million pages.

In August 2025 the Library of Congress upgraded to a new website for Chronicling America, with existing URLs automatically redirecting to the new address. Changes include:

- new Chronicling America URL https://www.loc.gov/collections/chronicling-america/about-this-collection/
- new interactive map
- new search options for ethnicity, location, and language
- new Advanced Search form
- new API documentation.
