= Swiss National Library =

National library in Bern, Switzerland

- Schweizerische Nationalbibliothek (German); Bibliothèque nationale suisse (French); Biblioteca nazionale svizzera (Italian); Biblioteca naziunala svizra (Romansh)

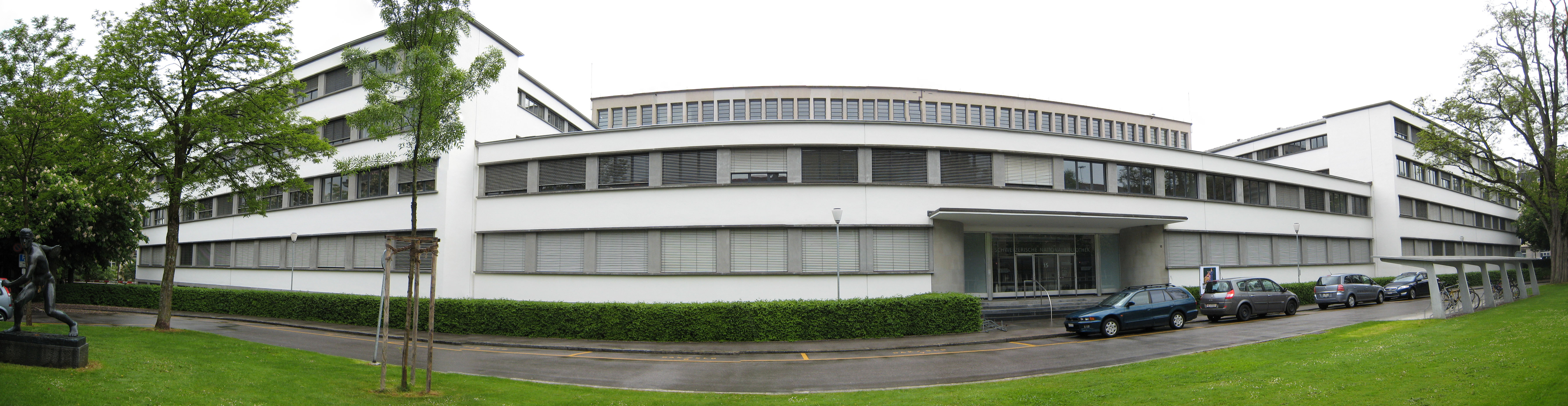
- Swiss National Library building in Bern
- 46°56′29″N 7°26′59″E
- Location: Bern, Switzerland
- Established: 1895 (131 years ago)
- Reference to legal mandate: Law about the Swiss National Library (available in German, French and Italian)

Collection
- Items collected: books, journals, newspapers, magazines, maps, official publications, posters, drawings and manuscripts
- Size: 5.1M items
- Criteria for collection: Helvetica: publications published in Switzerland or written by Swiss authors or concerning Switzerland
- Legal deposit: No, but agreements with publishers

Access and use
- Access requirements: Reading rooms: free. Registration for lending: be Swiss resident or citizen over 18

Other information
- Budget: 37.8M Swiss francs (2023)
- Director: Mr. Damian Elsig (since 2021)
- Employees: 151 FTE (2023)
- Website: nb.admin.ch (Automated Accessibility Score = 6.2 decimal)

The Swiss National Library (German: Schweizerische Nationalbibliothek, French: Bibliothèque nationale suisse, Italian: Biblioteca nazionale svizzera, Romansh: Biblioteca naziunala svizra) is the national library of Switzerland. Part of the Federal Office of Culture, it is charged with collecting, cataloging and conserving information in all fields, disciplines, and media connected with Switzerland, as well as ensuring the widest possible accessibility and dissemination of such data.

The Swiss National Library is intended to be open to all and, by the breadth and scope of its collection, aims to reflect the plurality and diversity of Swiss culture. It is a heritage site of national significance.

== History ==
On 28 June 1894 the Swiss parliament created the library with the responsibility of collecting "Helvetica": all publications relating to the Swiss and Switzerland. In 1899, the library opened to the public in the Federal Archives building. In 1931, the library moved to a newly-constructed building on Hallwylstrasse. The building was designed in the Modernist style of New Objectivity and is a listed historic monument.

In 1991, a plan was made to construct underground stacks and modernize the building. The first underground stack opened in 1997 and holds books, literary archives, and special collections. The second underground stack opened in 2009 and holds newspapers and periodicals. The library expects it will have reserve storage capacity until 2038. Between 1994 and 2001, the library building was renovated to modernize and extend it.

In 2000, the Centre Dürrenmatt Neuchâtel, a museum of Friedrich Dürrenmatt's works, opened as a unit of the library in Neuchâtel.

== Collections ==
The Swiss National Library collection includes an extensive collection of books, newspapers, maps and atlases, official publications and printed music. The National Library's book collection contains the entire output of Swiss publishers in all languages and adds almost 15,000 new publications in a given year. There is no legal deposit law in place but rather an agreement with Swiss publishers. As of 2020, the library held 4.8 million publications.

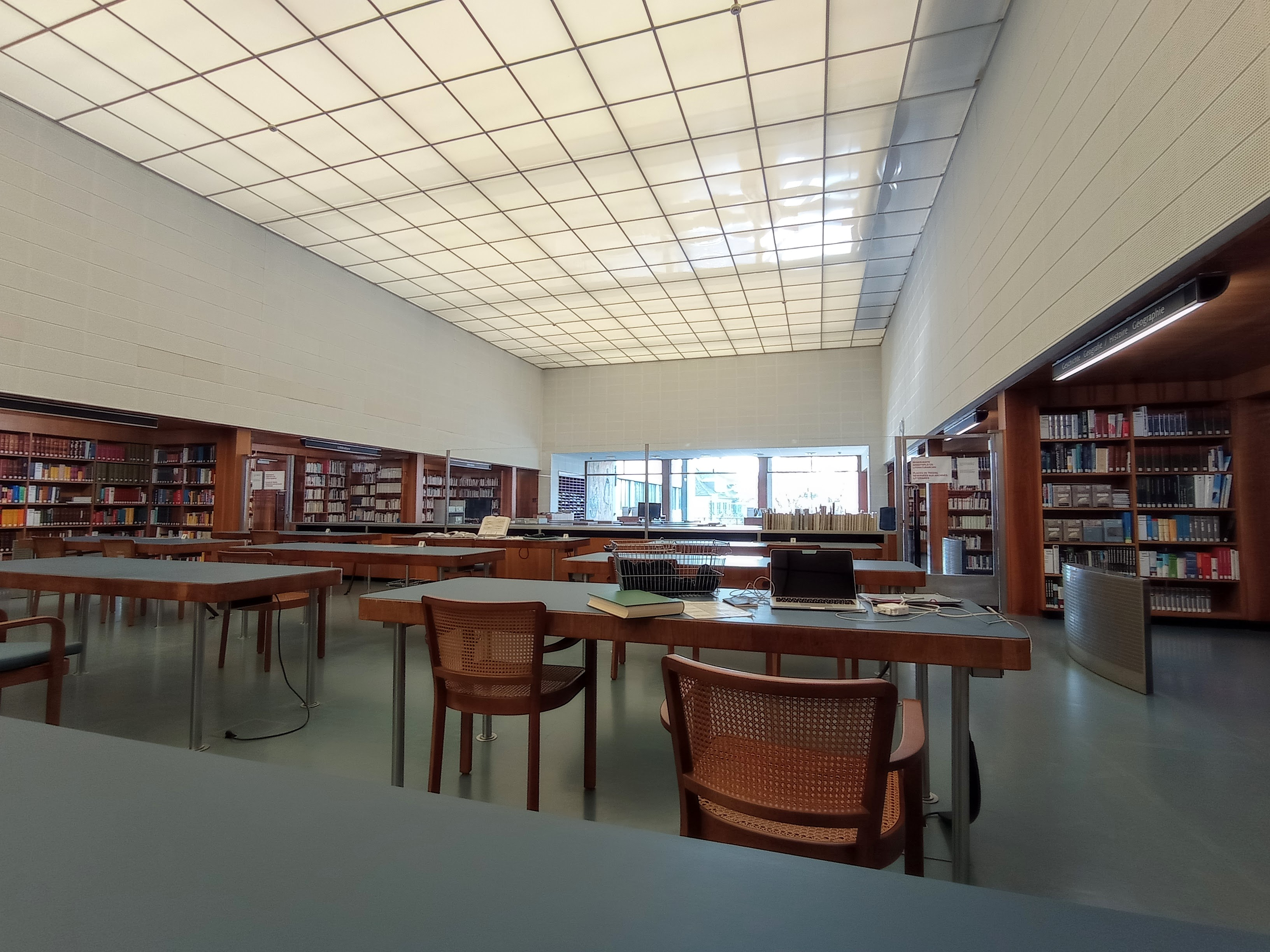
Swiss National Library main reading room

Special collections that are housed at the National Library include the Lüthi Bible Collection, musical estates, the Archives of the New Helvetic Society and many more collections on topics including library science, press and radio, politics, sports, science and genealogy.

The National Library has an extensive poster collection as part of its Prints and Drawings department that covers Swiss poster production. The poster collection includes the Claude Kuhn Archive, which features over 350 posters created by the Bernese artist.

The Library also collects born-digital publications. These are collectively known as "e-Helvetica". This collection consists of six components:

- Digital commercial publications
- Digital official publications
- Digital standards
- Digital university publications (e-Diss.ch)
- Websites (Web Archive Switzerland)
- Wikipedia articles

== Activities ==
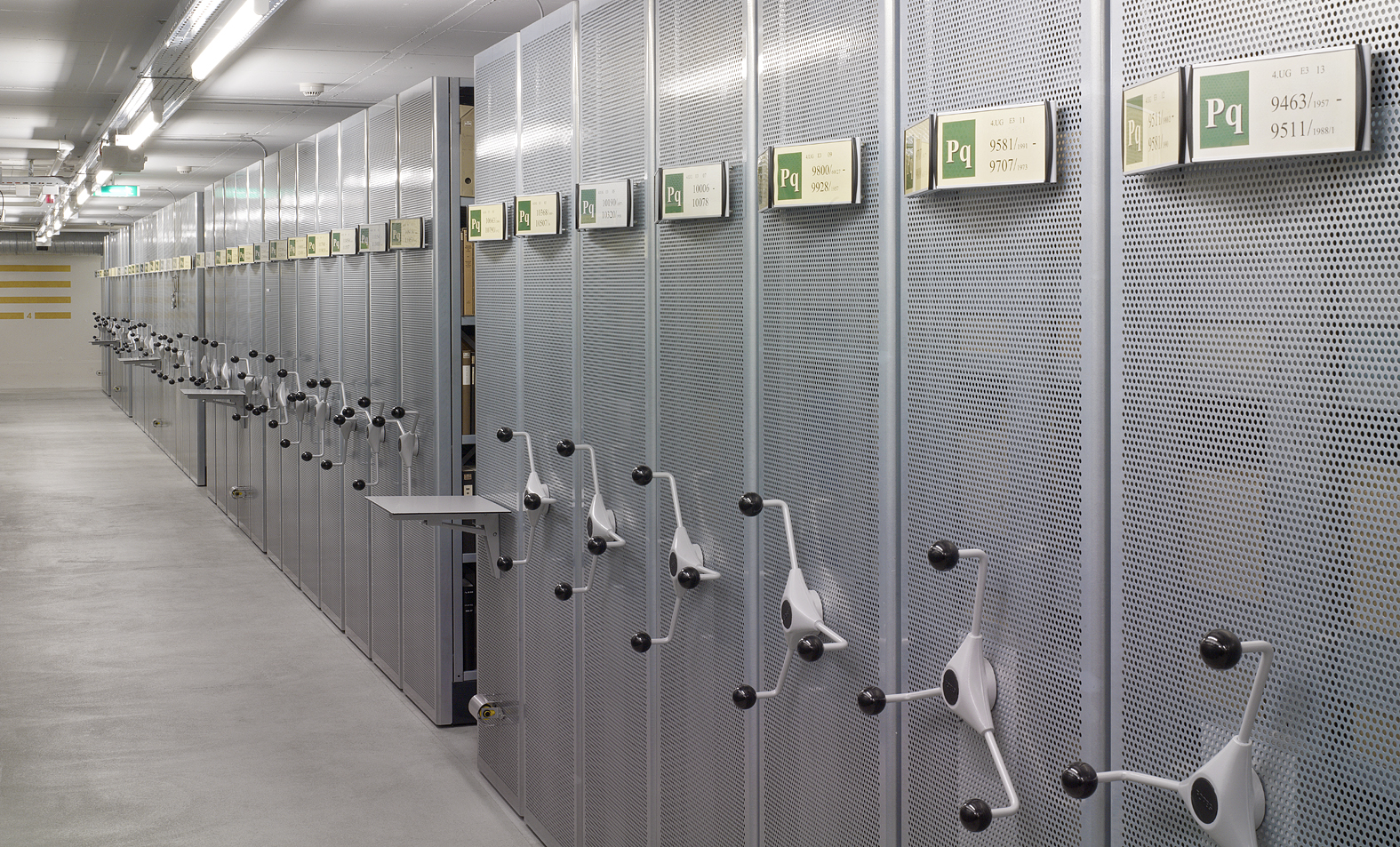
Stacks at the National Library

In 1901, the library published the first volume of the Swiss Book, the national bibliography of Switzerland. Editions are published each year.

In 1928, the Swiss Union Catalog was formed to create a central catalog for all Swiss libraries. In 1979, the National Library took over the catalog's management from the Swiss Librarians' Association. In 2010, with the advent of digital catalogs, the service closed.

Since 1995, the library has housed the ISSN Centre Switzerland which assigns ISSNs to Swiss serial publications.

In 1998, the Swiss Literary Archives were established as division of the National Library to collect literary estates and archives. In 2016, the Swiss National Sound Archives came under the organization of the library. In 2011, the library created Swiss Press Online, an online archive of digitized Swiss newspapers in its collection. This was upgraded in 2018 to the successor service e-newspaperarchives.ch.

Quarto is the journal of the Swiss National Library and focuses on a different one of Switzerland's four literatures (German, French, Italian and Romansh) with texts and essays on the featured literature. The journal is published once or twice each year.

== Web accessibility ==
On September 2025, the website of the Swiss National Library was tested for conformance with Web Content Accessibility Guidelines (WCAG).

The website of Swiss National Library obtained a score of 6.2 decimal out of 10. This is known as Automated Accessibility Score provided by , which, in turn, uses . The test was taken on September 2025 as part of a research on web accessibility of national libraries around the world.

This result means that the website of Swiss National Library cannot be considered accessible, if the threshold is stabilised as 8 out of 10. Therefore, efforts still need to be made to achieve full compliance with web accessibility directives.

This section is added to this page in order to raise awareness about the web accessibility barriers faced by persons with disabilities that limit them to equally enjoying the Web. Web accessibility is considered basic human right by the Convention on the Rights of Persons with Disabilities from the United Nations (UN).

== Full-time positions since 2007 ==
Raw data

Source: "Federal Finance Administration FFA: Data portal".
