= NewspaperArchive =

Newspaper archive website

- Website type: Online newspaper archive
- Founded: 1999
- Headquarters: 5314 River Run Drive; Suite 110; Provo, UT, 84660
- Owner: World Archives
- Parent: Charles Thayne Capital
- Website: newspaperarchive.com

NewspaperArchive is a commercial online database of digitized newspapers, and claims to be the world's largest newspaper archive. The site was launched in 1999 by its parent company, Heritage Microfilm, Inc. of Cedar Rapids, Iowa. It is currently overseen by Heritage Archives, Inc.

As of June 2008, NewspaperArchive said it provided full text search for 909 million articles on 85 million pages over 240 years that represented 2,875 publication titles in more than 748 cities. As of 2015, the product includes newspapers from Azerbaijan, Canada, China, Denmark, France, Germany, Ireland, Jamaica, Japan, Kazakhstan, Kyrgyzstan, South Africa, Tajikistan, Turkmenistan, the United Kingdom, the United States, the U.S. Virgin Islands, and Uzbekistan.

Searches can be conducted by keyword, date, and location. Results are free, but access to the newspaper articles available to download in PDF format requires a subscription. Searching is available directly from newspaperarchive.com or via news.google.com/archivesearch. The company says that it follows the Automated Content Access Protocol in which its clients have a say in what is available online. The digitized newspapers that are currently available and OCR'd represent a fraction of the 150 million pages of historical documents that Heritage Microfilm maintains in its microform archive. According to NewspaperARCHIVE.com, it is microfilming 2.5 million pages of newspapers each month and has 180,000 reels of microfilm.

A reviewer in 2004 observed that at the time the archive had some errors with year dates, in June 2014, The Iowa Attorney General’s Office opened an investigation after complaints about deceptive and misleading practices that include charging subscribers for involuntary donations to a charity, and on August 1, 2014, Newspaper Archive, Inc. had a rating of F from Better Business Bureau.

The website was brought down for two days in June 2008 by the Iowa Flood of 2008, which cut power to its data center in Cedar Rapids. The company said that its physical archives, which are stored on higher ground, were not damaged.

NewspaperArchive stated as of June 30, 2018 that it has online newspapers dating from 1607 worldwide and its index includes 9,829 newspapers. In 2020, Heritage Microfilm assets were rebranded as World Archives and acquired by Charles Thayne Capital. As a part of the acquisition, new owner Charles Thayne Capital went on to name former Ancestry.com executive, Kendall Hulet, as CEO of the platform.

In 2023, World Archives launched a new family history brand, Storied.com, that offers the NewspaperArchive content with NewspaperArchive.com continues to operate to provide research-oriented users a place to discover articles, obituaries, marriage announcements, and other newspaper-oriented content.

Since being acquired by World Archives, NewspaperArchive.com has undergone a reputational turnaround, with its Better Business Bureau rating improving from an F to an A+. NewspaperArchive has also made significant investments in expanding its newspaper content. The platform now includes 16,843 publications from over 3,577 cities around the world and continues to add new content daily.

In February 2026, the website suffered a cyberattack which caused it to be unavailable for over a month.
