= William Barrow (chemist) =

American chemist and paper conservator (1904–1967)

William James Barrow (December 11, 1904 – August 25, 1967) was an American chemist and paper conservator, and a pioneer of library and archives conservation. He introduced the field of conservation to paper deacidification through alkalization.

== Overview ==
An American document restorer and former director of the W. J. Barrow Research Laboratory located in Richmond, Virginia, where he became highly recognized for his pioneering achievements in the preservation and conservation of historical documents. He was an innovator and entrepreneur. Barrow was at one time considered by many authorities to be the leading independent scientific center for research into paper and the deterioration of paper.

William J. Barrow developed the first practical roller-type laminator. With this device, Barrow developed a process for laminating brittle documents between tissue and cellulose acetate film, as well as a highly effective means of deacidifying paper. He demonstrated the facts of paper stability over the past four centuries and developed a durable paper having a high degree of permanence.

Barrow was also a part of a team of paper manufacturers, partially supported by the paper industry, which developed a large-scale process to manufacture alkaline or permanent-durable paper from wood fiber. He was also involved in other investigations connected with paper and ink for a period of more than 30 years, and was probably the most important single contributor to the knowledge of methods of achieving permanence and durability of archival materials.

William Barrow had a thorough knowledge of both library and archival practices, a long record of published research, and a command of his technical specialty. In honor of William J. Barrow's contributions to the library and archival professions, he was recognized as one of the "100 of the most important leaders we had in the 20th Century" according to the American Libraries.

William James Barrow became interested in the problems of paper deterioration while investigating the history of his family. Even though Barrow did not have a formal education in the field of chemistry, the mystery of paper deterioration became his passion. This passion became his life's work to determine what the causes were and to slow the deterioration process down or eliminate it altogether. W. J. Barrow Research Laboratory ceased operations in 1977, ten years after his death on August 25, 1967.

== Significance to preservation ==
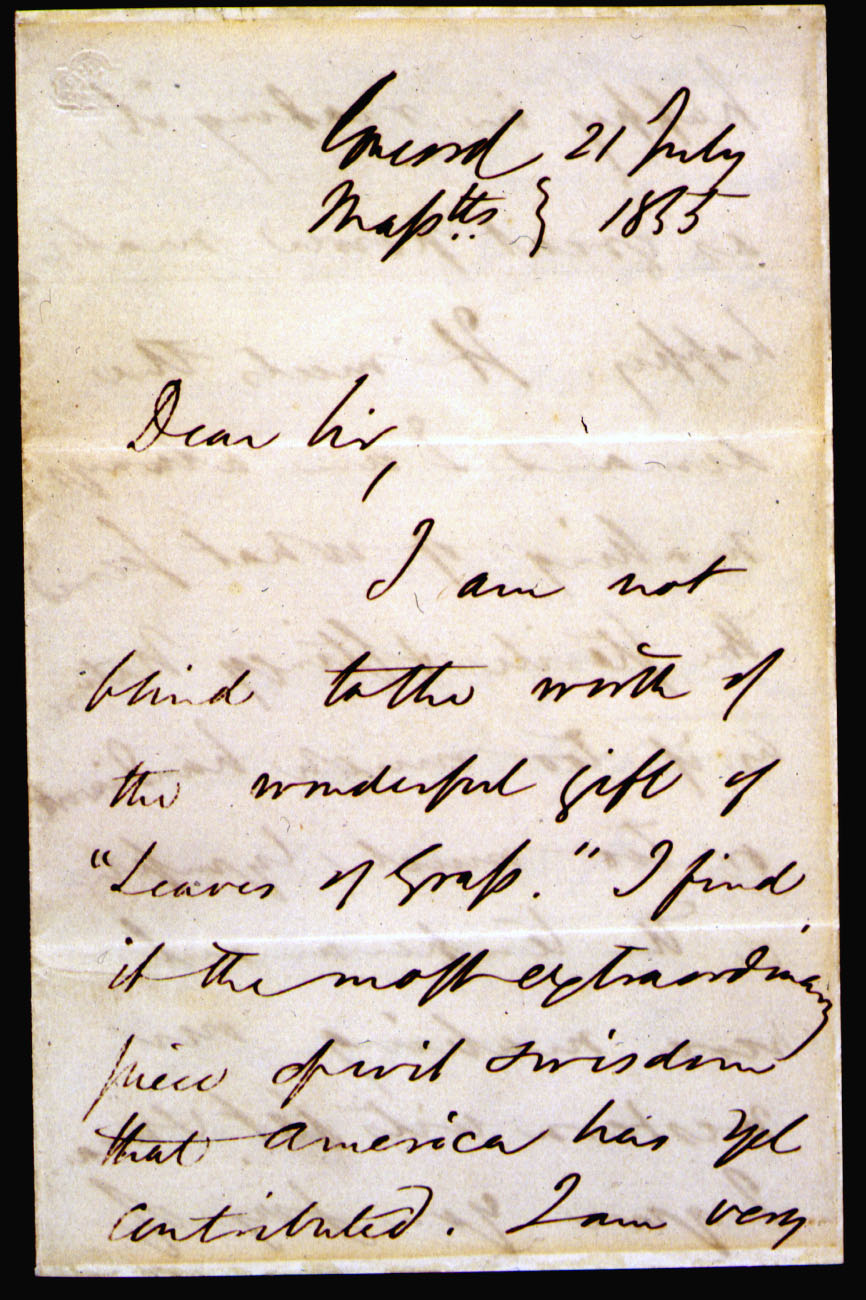
Emerson's Letter to Whitman is yellowing due to acidification.

Before the 1850s, linen and cotton rag were the primary material source for papermaking, but a shortage drove the market to develop the notoriously acidic wood-pulp alternative. With the advent of steam-driven paper making machines such as the Fourdrinier in the 19th century, in conjunction with the advent of the steam driven rotary printing press, wood based paper caused a major transformation of the 19th century economy and society in industrialized countries. The wide availability of cheap wood based paper can be credited with the birth of ephemera, and consequently with the birth of modern paper preservation, as large quantities of rapidly deteriorating materials needed the attention of science.

Barrow published an article in the 1930s that introduced librarians, archivists, and other restorers to chemical means of controlling the acid deterioration of paper. While he is widely considered to be the first promoter of acid paper issues, his earliest published work on this topic went somewhat unheeded until the 1950s when he began to receive grants from the Council on Library Resources (CLR) and the American Library Association (ALA), among others. The delay in addressing these issues could be largely due to the onset of the Depression, and the following paper-hungry war which pushed the acid paper problem to the back of scientists' minds.

Barrow's greatest significance is perhaps as an aggressive promoter of paper preservation, as in retrospect his scientific discoveries have not been entirely sound. For example, his tests to accelerate the natural aging of paper samples at elevated temperatures have since proven to be erroneous, and modern scholars doubt his importance as an original chemical researcher.

== Critical reputation ==
Barrows' innovations did not move forward in history without some controversy or challenges. Some doubts arose in the mid-1970s concerning document conservation practices. These criticisms were being directed at the Barrow process of lamination and deacidification. The doubts appeared in a summary in the American Archivist, April, 1976. The criticisms were stating that the Barrow lamination process had some harmful effects caused by heat. Frazer G. Poole, the assistant Director for Preservation for the Library of Congress authored the article. Upon further investigation by The Preservation for the Library of Congress into the allegations, they found Poole's report to be lacking in hard scientific data because the report consisted of broad observations, undocumented generalizations, and inferential statements.

Several of Barrows' major conclusions are heavily questioned in the course of Nicholson Baker's book Double Fold. Additionally, according to the Library of Congress Barrows' works on accelerated aging "have since proven to be erroneous."

== Authorship ==
William J. Barrow wrote several articles and publications documenting his work and findings. One of those articles was the "500 Book Paper", written in 1957. In this article, Barrow documented the findings of some physical tests performed in the Rare Book Room of the Virginia State Library. In 1959 he wrote the "Deterioration of Book Stock Causes and Remedies". This book was written documenting two studies he performed. The first, to determine the physical strength of non-fiction book papers from 1900-1949, and the second, to determine the stabilization of modern book papers. In 1960, William Barrow wrote "The Manufacture and Testing of Durable Book Papers" which he takes his findings from his 1959 publication and demonstrate that it was possible to treat newly manufactured papers with solutions of magnesium and calcium bicarbonates, thus neutralizing acidity and prolonging the life of such papers materially.

== Education and career ==
Barrow was a native of Brunswick County, Virginia, born December 11, 1904. He graduated from Randolph-Macon Academy and later attended Randolph-Macon College. Although Barrow never completed his undergraduate education, he was awarded an honorary doctorate by his alma mater, Randolph-Macon College, a year before his death. Lacking extensive formal training, he overcame this deficit and became an able and serious researcher through assiduous home study, discussions with recognized experts through apprenticeship with professional paper chemists from the National Bureau of Standards and the National Printing Office, and daily hands-on work in the laboratory.

== The Barrow Book Collection ==
"The Barrow Book Collection comprises 1000 books from the period of 1507-1899 that William James Barrow (1904-1967) used in a series of scientific studies on the degradation of paper."

== Selected bibliography ==
- Barrow, W. J. 1939. The Barrow method of laminating documents. Journal of Documentary Reproduction, 2 (June): 147-151.
- Barrow, W. J. 1954. Migration of impurities in paper.
- Hummel, R. O., Jr. and W. J. Barrow. 1956. Lamination and other methods of restoration. Library Trends, 4 (January): 259-268.
- Barrow, W. J. 1957. Physical strength of non-fiction book papers, 1900-1949: A preliminary report to Council on Library Resources, Inc.
- Barrow, W. J. and R. C. Sproull. 1959. Permanence in book papers. Science, 129 (24 April): 1075-1084.
- Barrow, W. J. 1959. A sample of strong and stable book paper.
- Barrow, W. J. 1959. Deterioration of book stock, causes and remedies: Two studies on the permanence of book paper (Virginia. State Library, [Richmond] Publications).
- Barrow, W. J. Manuscripts and Documents, Their Deterioration and Restoration, Charlottesville, The University Press of Virginia, 1955
- Barrow, W. J. 1959 The Barrow method of restoring deteriorated documents
- Church, R. W., ed. 1960. The manufacture and testing of durable book papers. Studies conducted by W. J. Barrow. (Virginia State Library Publications, no. 13). Richmond, Virginia: Virginia State Library.
- Barrow, W. J. 1964. An accelerated aging study of several writing papers: Re-evaluation of data. Tappi. 47 (February): 105-107.
- Barrow, W. J. and A. M. Carlton. 1967. Durability of three current laminating tissues. American Archivist. 30 (July): 526-529.

== See also ==
- Acidic paper
- Archival science
- Brittle Books Program
- Library and Information Science
- Mass deacidification
- Preservation survey
- Preservation (library and archive)
