= Brittle Books Program =

American book preservation initiative

The Brittle Books Program is an initiative carried out by the National Endowment for the Humanities at the request of the United States Congress. The initiative began officially between 1988 and 1989 with the intention to involve the eventual microfilming of over 3 million endangered volumes.

== Purpose ==
In the beginning half of the 20th century it became apparent that the use of acidic wood-pulp paper, common since the 1850s, was causing paper materials to slowly burn. This has been referred to as the slow fire. A statement submitted to the House of Representatives estimated that there were 80 million brittle books in North American libraries, 12 million of which were unique titles. As mass deacidification efforts proved costly and inconsistent, librarians and archivists began looking for more practical ways to preserve the intellectual content of the decaying material. Microfilm, one of the most stable and durable mediums around at the time, was decided to be the most reasonable alternative.

== Timeline ==
- 1987 - A subcommittee of the House of Representatives during the 100th Congress (1st session) addressed the problem of "brittle books in our nation's libraries."
- March 17, 1988 - Patricia Battin, president of the Commission on Preservation and Access (CPA), testified before the U.S. House of Representatives' Subcommittee on Interior and Related Agencies (Committee on Appropriations). She proposed a collaborative approach to the preservation of the nation's brittle books and asked the House to increase federal funding for preservation microfilming.
- October, 1988 - An appropriations bill for fiscal year 1989 gave the National Endowment for the Humanities $12.5 million. Eight million dollars of that sum went to instituting a twenty-year program for the microfilming of endangered volumes.
- 1995 - The program was assessed to be on schedule and 25% complete.
- Roughly 50,000 brittle and endangered volumes are microfilmed each year.

== Important figures ==
William Barrow was a pioneer conservator in the library science field. He connected the paper strength or lack thereof (brittle paper) to the acidity of the groundwood used to make wood pulp after the 1850s. With his own observations of his collection and tests conducted, he announced to the library community that acid deterioration begins to show signs after 20,40 and 80 years.

== Structure ==
As with other National Endowment for the Humanities programs, the Brittle Books Program is a partnership program, meaning that qualifying institutions must apply for grants in order to participate. Should the institution be accepted, they are required to share at least 33% of the program's costs. Unlike other National Endowment for the Humanities preservation funding initiatives, the Brittle Books program does require that an institution in each state must be awarded a grant. The projects are largely run at the state level with the National Endowment for the Humanities providing methodologies, assuring a standard level of quality, and connecting the efforts of the various institutions. To be awarded a grant as part of the Brittle Books Program, institutions were required to abide by five basic conditions:

- 1. That they abide by the national standard
- 2. That they create three copies of all material: a master negative, a print negative, and a service copy
- 3. That a record adhering to national standards be entered into a national bibliographic database
- 4. That interlibrary loan copies be readily available
- 5. That storage conditions meet that of the national standard

== Preservation issues ==
=== Deacidification ===
While there is a deacidification method that can successfully lower the acidity in brittle books, many public libraries do not have the funding to implement standard programs to halt the deterioration taking place in these institutions. Some repositories have the resources to send books for a deacidification wash in stages.

Deacidification washes are usually a viable option for most repositories as books can be sent in bulk; however, only books of excellent physical quality may be sent. The wash process is rather aggressive and any deformities in a book may cause damage to already brittle specimens. Therefore, libraries would have to first repair those books in less than desirable condition - specifically elements of the binding, leaf attachments, and text attachments - before deacidification. These extra conservation efforts would increase the costs of deacidification.

=== Paper splitting ===
Another option to preserve brittle books is to perform paper splitting. This process dissects a book by its leaf and text attachment and treats each sheet of paper individually. Supervised by a book conservator, a paper conservator, and a conservation specialist, pages are literally pulled apart - fronts from backs - and a piece of alkaline paper is placed in between. The acid pages are then sandwiched back together with a non-acid buffer between them to slow the deterioration process. However, only ZFB (the Zentrum für Bucherhaltung) offers this procedure (also called mechanical paper splitting). They claim the process is so refined, they have successfully split cigarette paper. Washes will de-acidify the paper though they will remain brittle; but paper splitting increases the strength and flexibility of the paper via the extra new sheet of buffered paper and the ZFB process includes de-acidification washes.

=== Microform ===
Microform is a reasonable option for Brittle Book preservation mainly because microfilm can be usable for 500 years, so long as it is stored in proper conditions and a microfilm reader is accessible. Even microfiche is easier to store than microfilm, provided organizational practices prevent the divestment of sheets from their filing system. Despite its proven record of durability, microform is no longer a preferred method of digitization because it lacks the accessibility that modern electronic digitization provides.

=== Digitization ===
Digital conversion of physical items is the preferred method, despite an estimated five-year longevity for most computer files. As proper archival-quality digitization requires use of large, uncompressed TIFF files, storage can be a significant cost, especially for public libraries. Moreover, copyright law restrains the ability to digitize all brittle books. While the library is authorized to make a copy of a book it cannot obtain through reasonable means, having a digital copy offers the possibility of unauthorized distribution if circulated in this format.

=== Photocopies ===
Many repositories, such as the University of Kansas, opt for preservation-quality photocopies. A list-serv is utilized for the posting of titles so a consortium of libraries can benefit from a reduced cost in replication so they may maintain their circulating collections. Maintained by OCLC, the submissions are processed at the OCLC Preservation Service Center and OCLC retains the digital copies produced as to defer any copyright issues away from the repositories subscribing to the service.

== Future ==
As libraries move into the digital era, preservation practices attempt to move with them. Current and future projects in preserving brittle volumes are more likely to involve scanning and digitization than microfilming. A recent example of such a program is the Digitizing America's Imprints project at the Library of Congress which received a $2 million grant in 2007.

== Further information ==
- Slow Fires: On the Preservation of the Human Record, a film by Terry Sanders
- Turning to Dust
- Double Fold: Libraries and the Assault on Paper, a book by Nicholson Baker
