= Cotton paper =

Type of paper

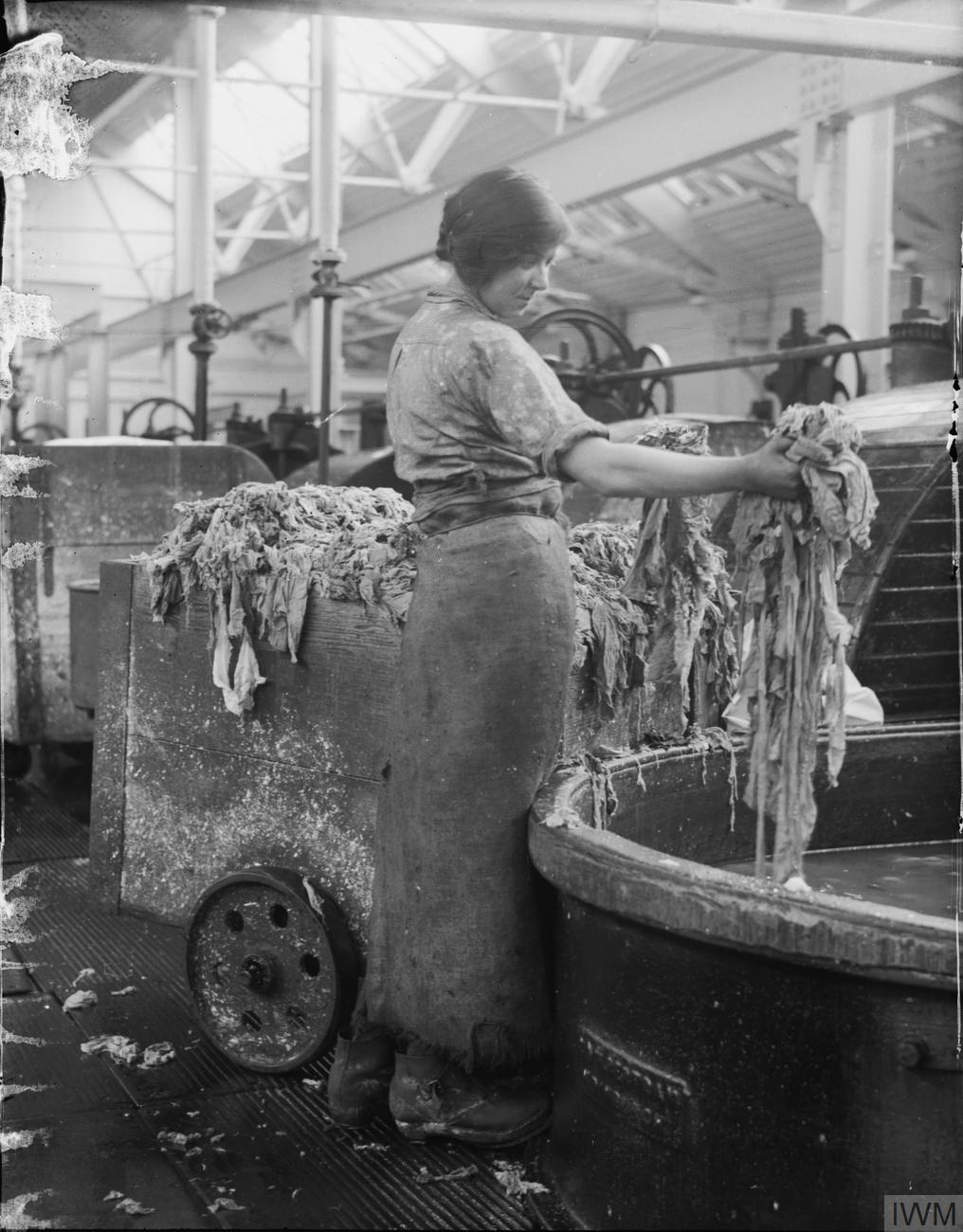
A worker feeding rags into the rag breaking machine in a paper factory in Scotland (1918)

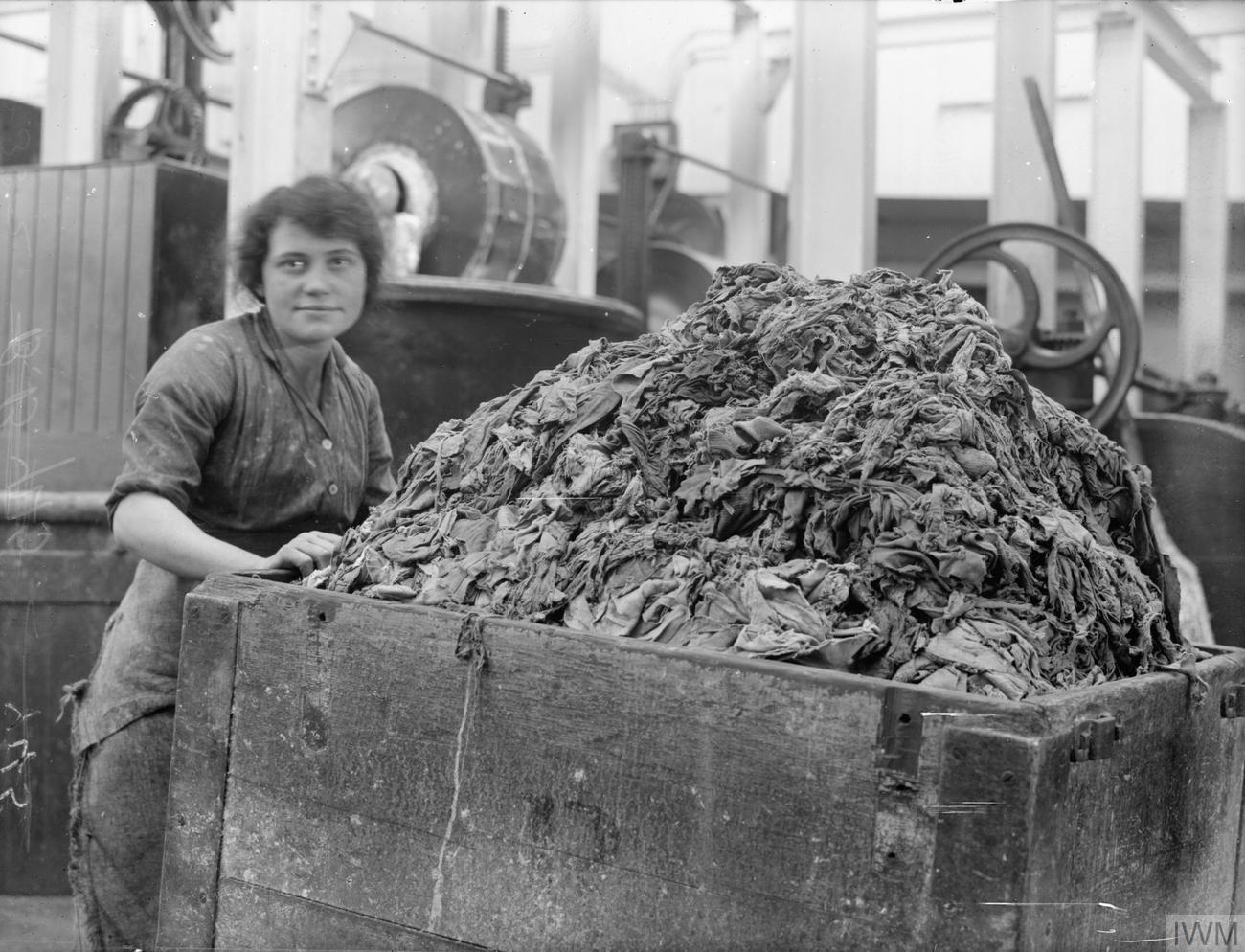
A trolley laden with boiled rags

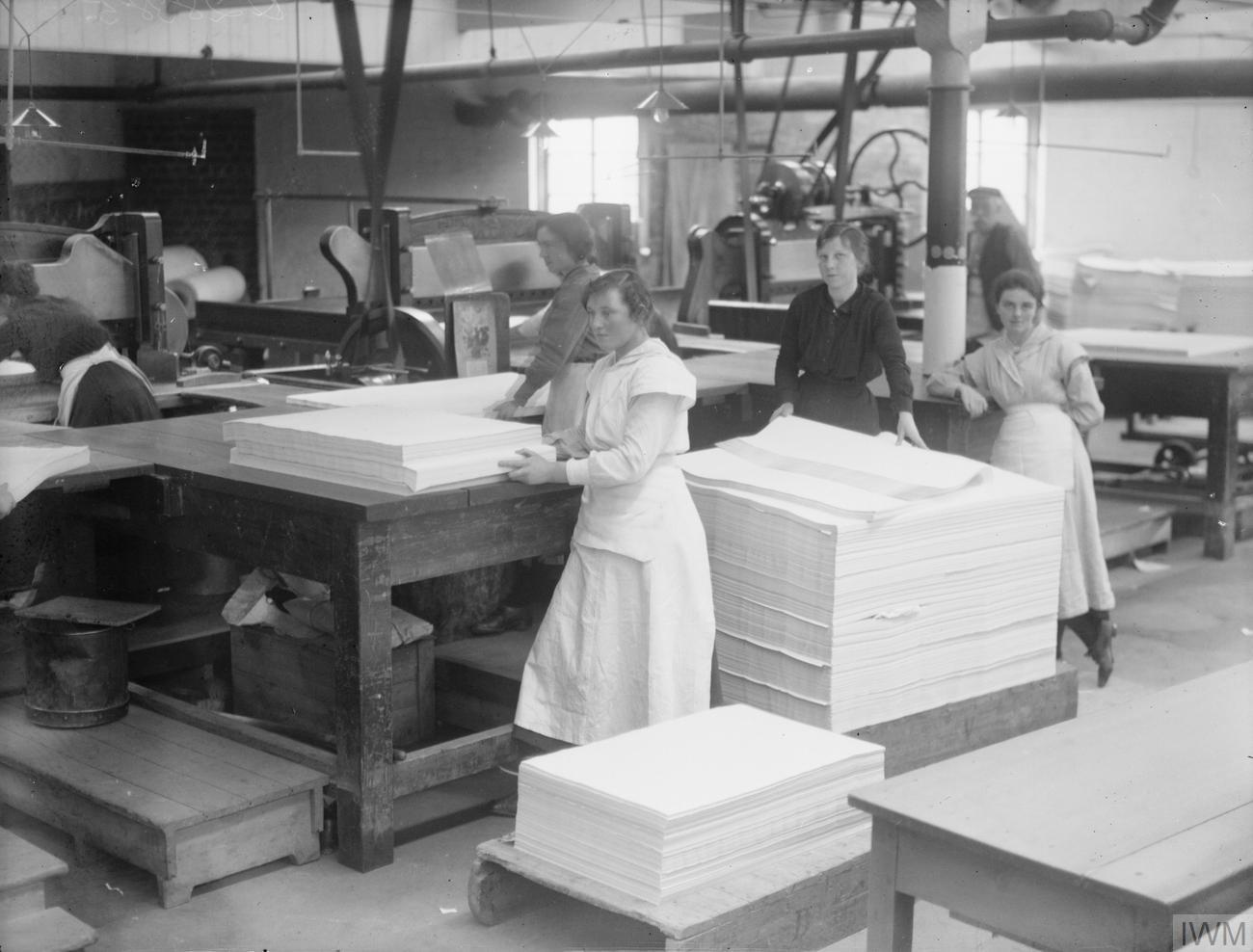
The paper being cut to size

Cotton paper is paper made from cotton fiber. Prior to the mid-19th century, cotton rag paper was the main form of paper produced but pulp paper replaced cotton paper as the main paper material during the 19th century. Cotton linters, a harvesting byproduct of fine fibers which stick to the cotton seeds after processing, became the primary source material. Although pulp paper was cheaper to produce, its quality and durability is lower; cotton paper continues to be more durable, and consequently important documents are often printed on cotton paper.

== History ==
Cotton was first used with a mixture of silk to make paper called Carta Bombycina. In the 1800s, fiber crops such as flax fibers or cotton from used cloths (rags) were the primary material source for paper. Beginning in the mid-19th century, wood pulp supplanted cloth; despite its lower quality, wood pulp was more readily available than cloth rags as global paper production increased. By the turn of the 20th century, most paper was made from wood pulp. Wood pulp paper durability would improve over the 20th century as bookbinders became aware of pulp paper acidity and adopted practices to counteract it, but cotton is still used for specialty papers intended for long-term preservation. As cotton rags now often contain synthetic fibers, papermakers have turned to second-cut cotton linters as raw material sources for making pulp for cotton papers.

== Properties ==
High-quality cotton fiber paper is known to last hundreds of years without appreciable fading, discoloration, or deterioration, so it is often used for important documents, such as the archival copies of dissertations or theses. As a rule of thumb, each percentage of cotton fiber in paper adds about one year of durability. Legal document paper typically contains 25% cotton. Unlike wood pulp-based paper, cotton paper is acid-free and cotton fibers are more porous and absorbent than wood pulp fibers, making it able to absorb more ink and produce a better printout than copy paper.

Cotton paper is typically graded as 25%, 50%, or 100% cotton. Usually it can be checked by holding the cotton paper up to the light and looking just below the watermark for a number. 100% cotton paper may contain small amounts of acids, and should be tested or certified before use for archival documents.

Second-cut cotton linters have a normal average fiber length of 1.45 μm, and have similar properties as a short softwood pulp.

== Uses ==
Cotton bond paper can be found at most stores that sell stationery and other office products. Some cotton paper contains a watermark. It is used for banknotes in a number of countries. These banknotes are typically made from 100% cotton paper, but can also be made with a mixture of 75% or less flax. Other materials may also be used and still be known as currency paper. Higher quality art papers are often made from cotton.

It has found extensive use as a printed circuit board substrate when mixed with epoxy resins and classified into CEM 1, CEM 2 etc.

== See also ==
- Hemp paper
- Acid-free paper
- Inkjet paper
- Deinking
- Blue paper
