= Rag paper =

Category of paper made from rags

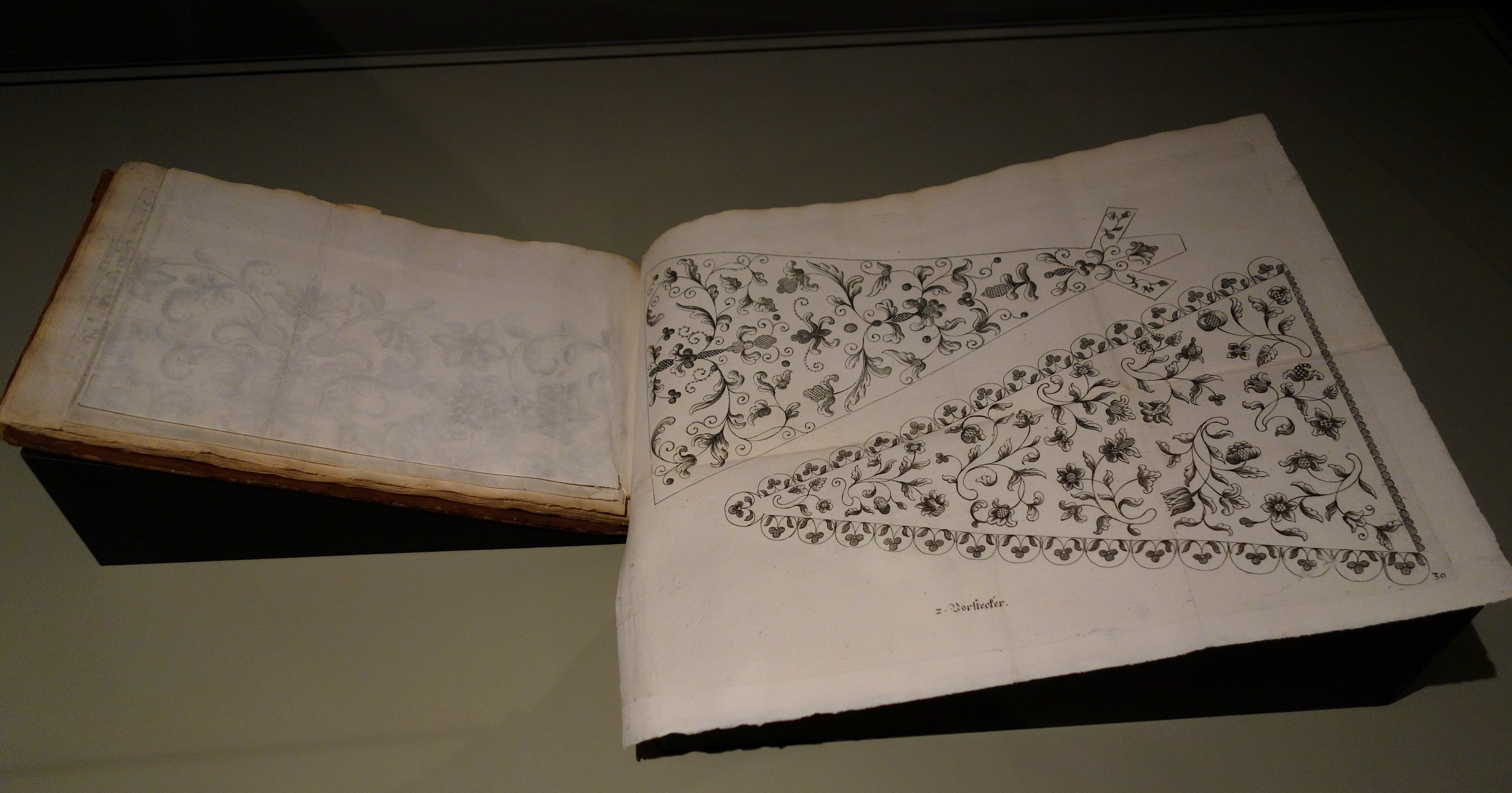
- Rag paper pattern book for lacemaking
- Type: Paper
- Material: Fiber crop rags
- Production process: Ragpicking; Papermaking
- Introduced: 106 AD, Han dynasty, China

Rag paper is a category of paper that is made from a pulp of discarded textiles, rope and other fibre products. Rag paper in its various forms was a widely-used paper for most of the past two millennia. Production spread along the Silk Road from its early 2nd-century origin in China to the Islamic world by the 8th century. It was introduced into Christian Europe by the 12th century, and western Europe came to dominate rag production up until the mid-19th century, when rag paper was displaced in favour of far more cost-efficient pulpwood acidic paper.

Rag paper is valued today as a specialty paper for its archival quality and tear resistance compared to wood pulp paper. Modern rag paper is often cotton paper, made from cotton linters, with a usual pH of 6.4 and degree of polymerization of 1481.2.

== History ==
=== Pre-Modern ===
==== China ====
The invention of rag paper is attributed to Cai Lun in 106 AD, Luoyang, China, when he beat hemp and ramie rags with rope scraps, paper mulberry and other fibres into a pulp. Dunhuang and Turfan were major centres of rag paper production in the first millennium, possibly due to their location in a desert environment that incentivised rag reuse versus mulberry paper production. Rag paper production declined in China after the 10th century due to the rising cost of textiles.

==== Islamic world ====
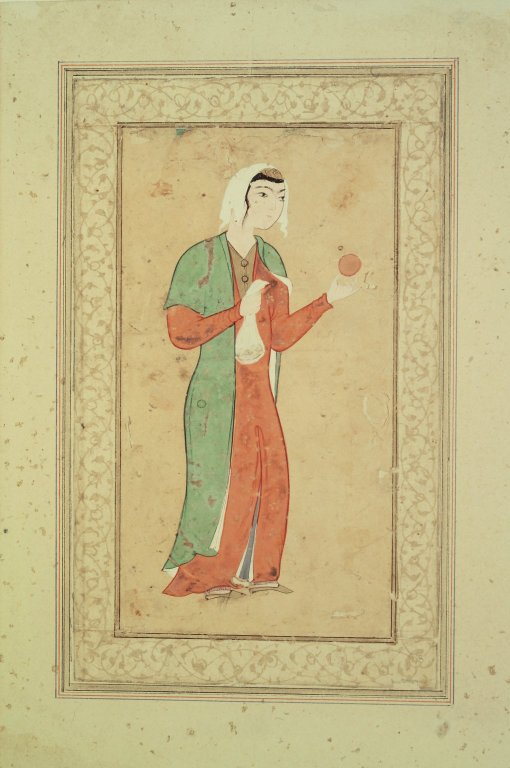
16th-century Islamic miniature

Rag paper was introduced to the Middle East through the Silk Road prior to the 8th century, but domestic production only began by the 8th century, particularly in Baghdad. Arab papermakers developed 'pure' rag paper, made from an alternative pulp entirely constituted from linen rags; this paper supplanted papyrus and parchment for most uses by the 11th century.

Some 13th-14th-century Muslims were initially skeptical of rag paper imported from Europe, proposing that it broke Islamic dietary laws vis-a-vis Christian worker contamination, as well as objecting to Christian watermarks. Ibn Marzuq dismissed these concerns in a fatwa, pointing to the cleaning process and historical alternative writing material use as justifications.

==== Europe ====
Rag paper spread to Al-Andalus by the mid-10th century, with Xàtiva being a major production center of linen rag paper by the 11th century. Sephardic Jews were heavily involved in the rag paper industry. The Reconquista saw Spanish Christians increasingly in possession of libraries of Andalusian paper books, spurring a Western European paper industry utilizing cotton rags in addition to linens.

In the late 12th century, rag paper spread to Italy through Mediterranean trade with the merchant republics. Amalfi paper was a particularly relevant Italian rag paper by the early 13th century; its prevalence as a writing material is marked by Frederick II, Holy Roman Emperor banning its use for court documents, in favor of parchment.

=== Modern ===
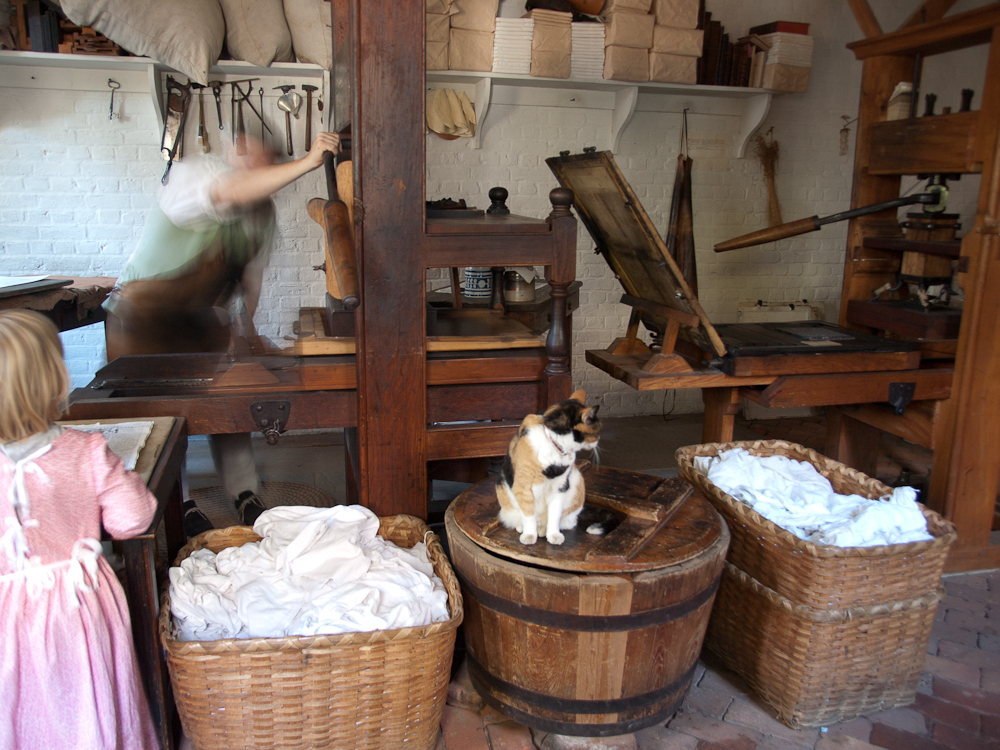
18th-century American rag paper shop

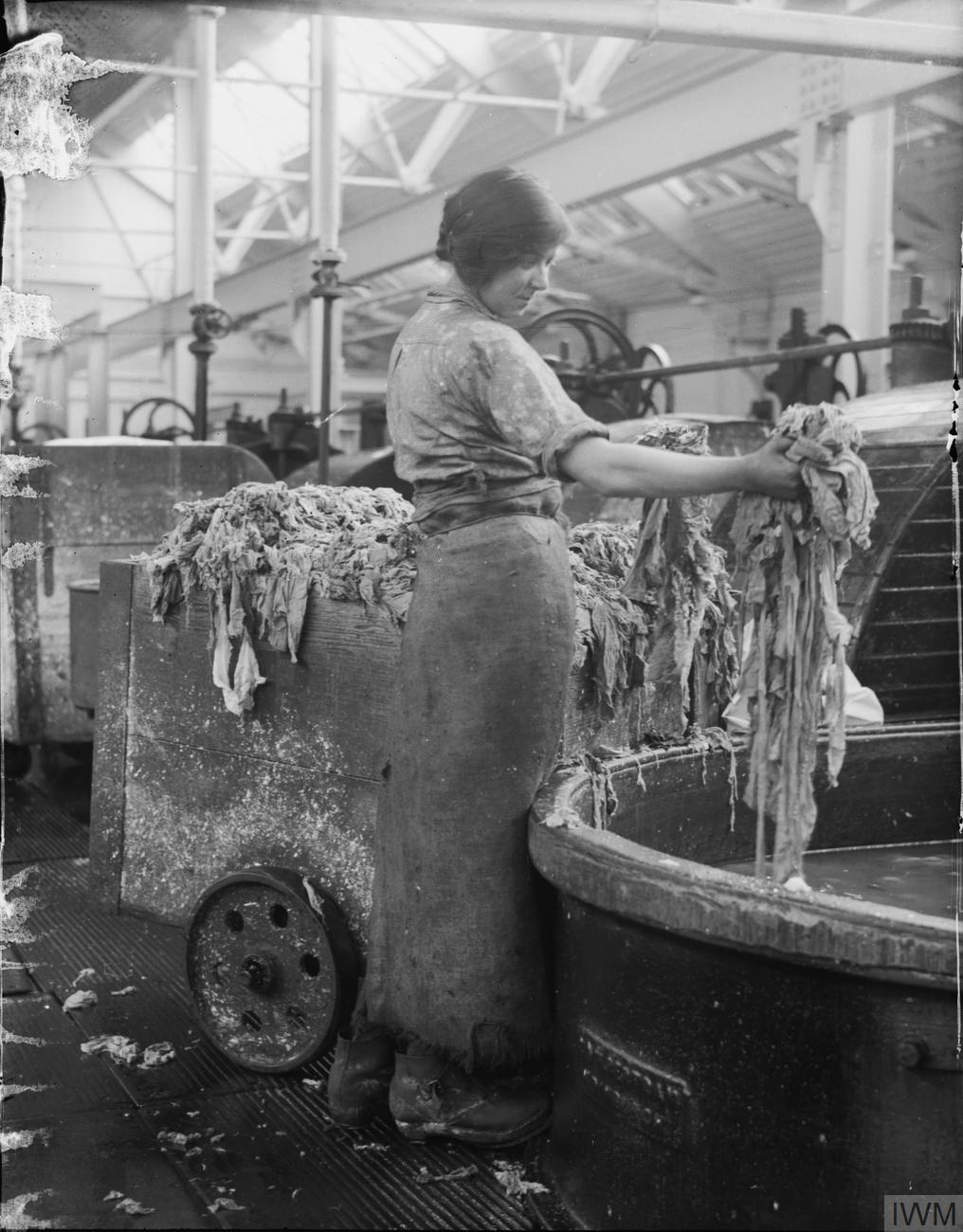
A worker feeding rags into a rag breaking machine in a paper factory in Scotland (1918)

==== Early modern ====
Following the invention of the printing press in the 15th century, the cost of book production dropped significantly, increasing paper demand. This introduced rag shortages for producers in Italy and Holland, and a rag export market demand for less urban regions like Portugal and the New World colonies. Rag exporters and local paper mills competed for a limited rag supply, like in the Republic of Lucca, a major rag paper production center: a late-16th-century rag shortage led to conflict between rag exporters and local paper mills, leading to a 1695 accord to regulate the rag export market.

Printing press production speeds did not significantly increase until the 1812 invention of the steam-powered printing press by Friedrich Koenig. Conversely, the 1799 invention of the paper machine mechanized the rag paper industry.

As the Industrial Revolution spread, Western Europe became the major exporters of rag paper, enjoying ample rag supply from urban center ragpickers and industrial textile production. The Ottoman Empire's domestic paper industry collapsed over the course of the late 18th century, succumbing to rag shortages and European price competition. The nascent American rag paper industry struggled to meet rag demand as well, as colonists could not be dissuaded from keeping rags for their own use; states and industrialists implored people to keep 'rag bags' to increase supplies.

==== Transition to pulpwood industrial standard ====
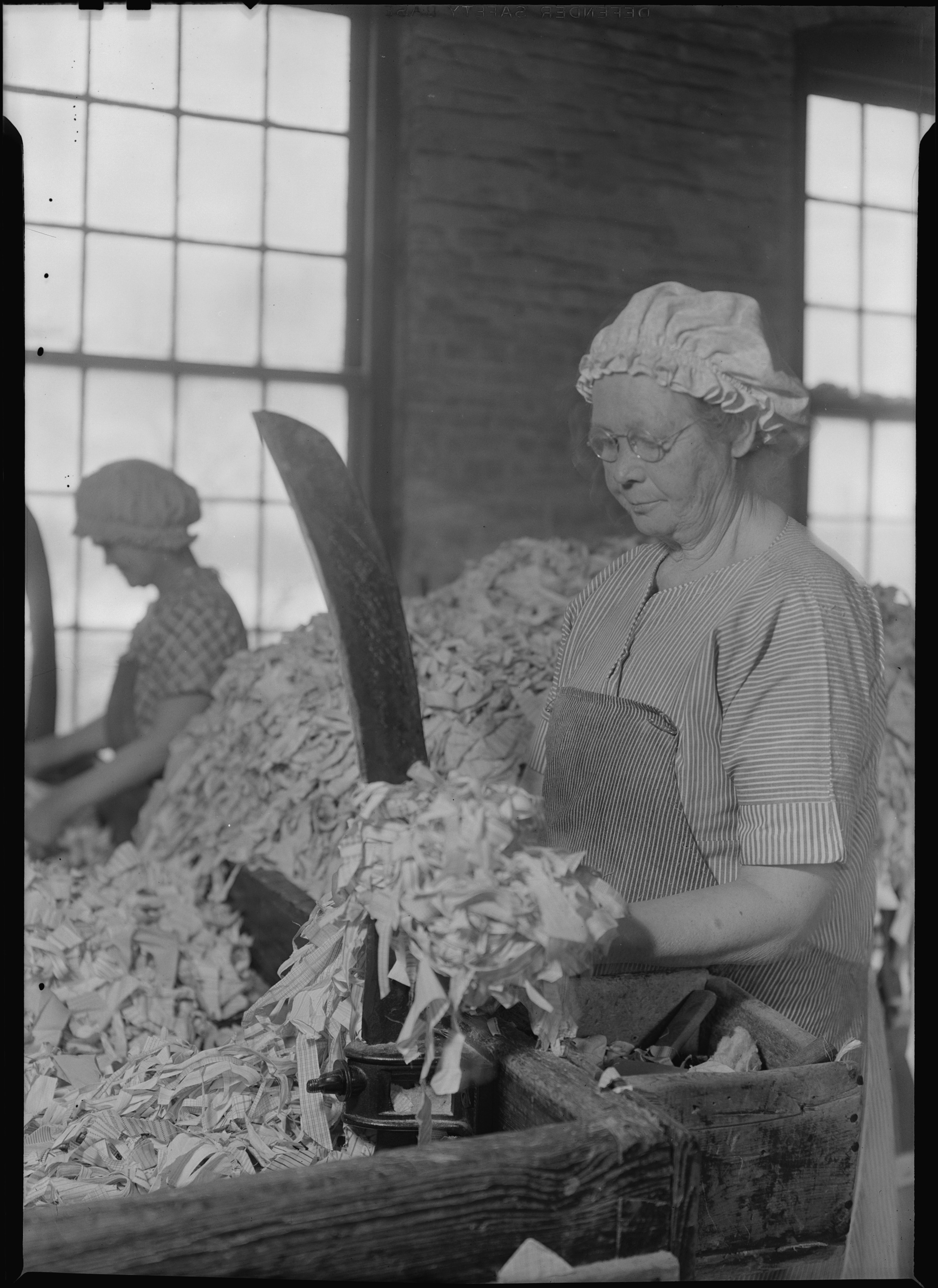
Rag sorter at American Writing Paper Company, Holyoke, Massachusetts

The 1844 invention of the rotary printing press and the rise of literacy in industrialized nations increased demand for and output of print products. As the rag paper print economy hit its zenith in the 1850s, even Western European industrial paper producers struggled to meet paper demand as it outpaced domestic rag-picking. In the United Kingdom, excise taxes on rags coupled with foreign demand for rag exports particularly bottle-necked the British rag paper industry; producers attempted to increase supply by bleaching colored rags, and housemaids were implored to sell their spare rags instead of keeping them as menstrual rags. The Times put out a bounty in 1855 for £1,000 for an alternative to rag paper.

In the United States, rag shortages continued from the 18th century through the Panic of 1837, incentivizing experiments with alternative natural fibers. Corn husk paper, straw paper, and Manila hemp paper were notable alternatives invented in the first half of the 19th century, but the standard American industrial pulp remained imported European linen rags cut with raw domestic cotton.

With the introduction of esparto grass paper in the 1860s and acidic paper in the later 19th century, rag-paper became increasingly economically obsolete. Newspapers were greatly incentivized to shift to newsprint, to minimize printing costs; however, archival quality suffered immensely due to slow fire decay.

== Production ==
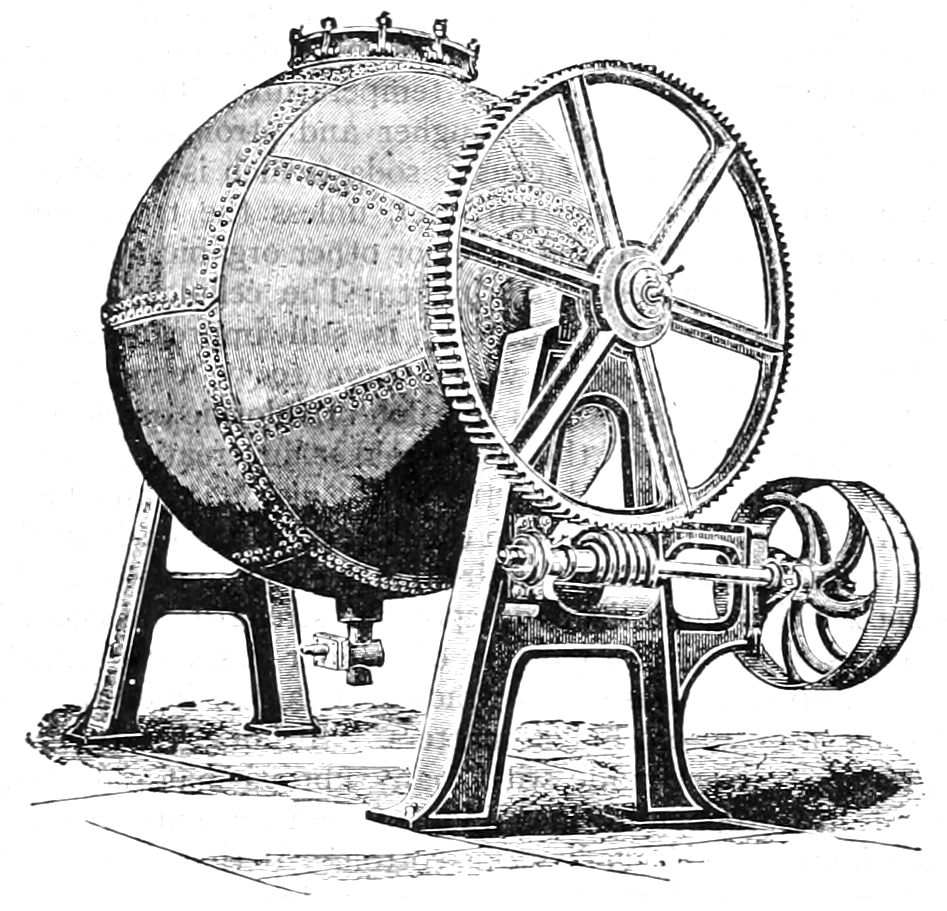
Kier for rag scouring

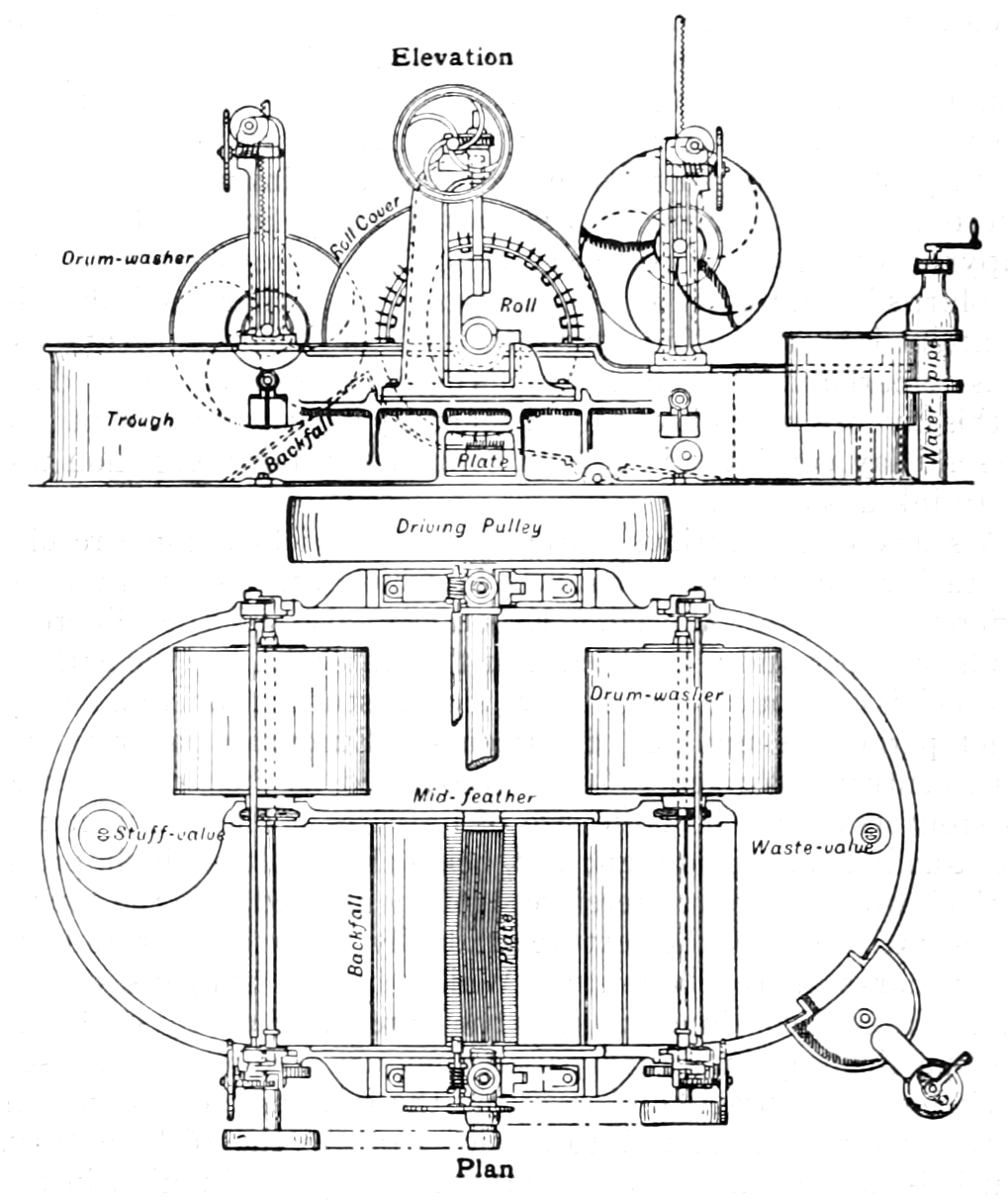
Schematic of industrial rag breaker

Rag-pickers would collect rags from urban areas to sell to producers, which would in turn make rag paper for sale back to city centers. Collected rags were cut, then scoured to remove impurities. The washed rags are ground into a pulp, then the pulp made into a slurry before screening, sizing and drying.

Industrialized rag paper production saw the introduction of paper machines, kiers, mechanical washers, and mounted scythe workstations to process larger amounts of rags.

== Types of rag paper ==
- Amalfi paper
- Cai Hou paper
- India paper
- Xuan paper

== See also ==
- Second Industrial Revolution
- Rag-and-bone man
