= Nisshinbo Holdings =

Japanese company

Nisshinbo Holdings Inc.

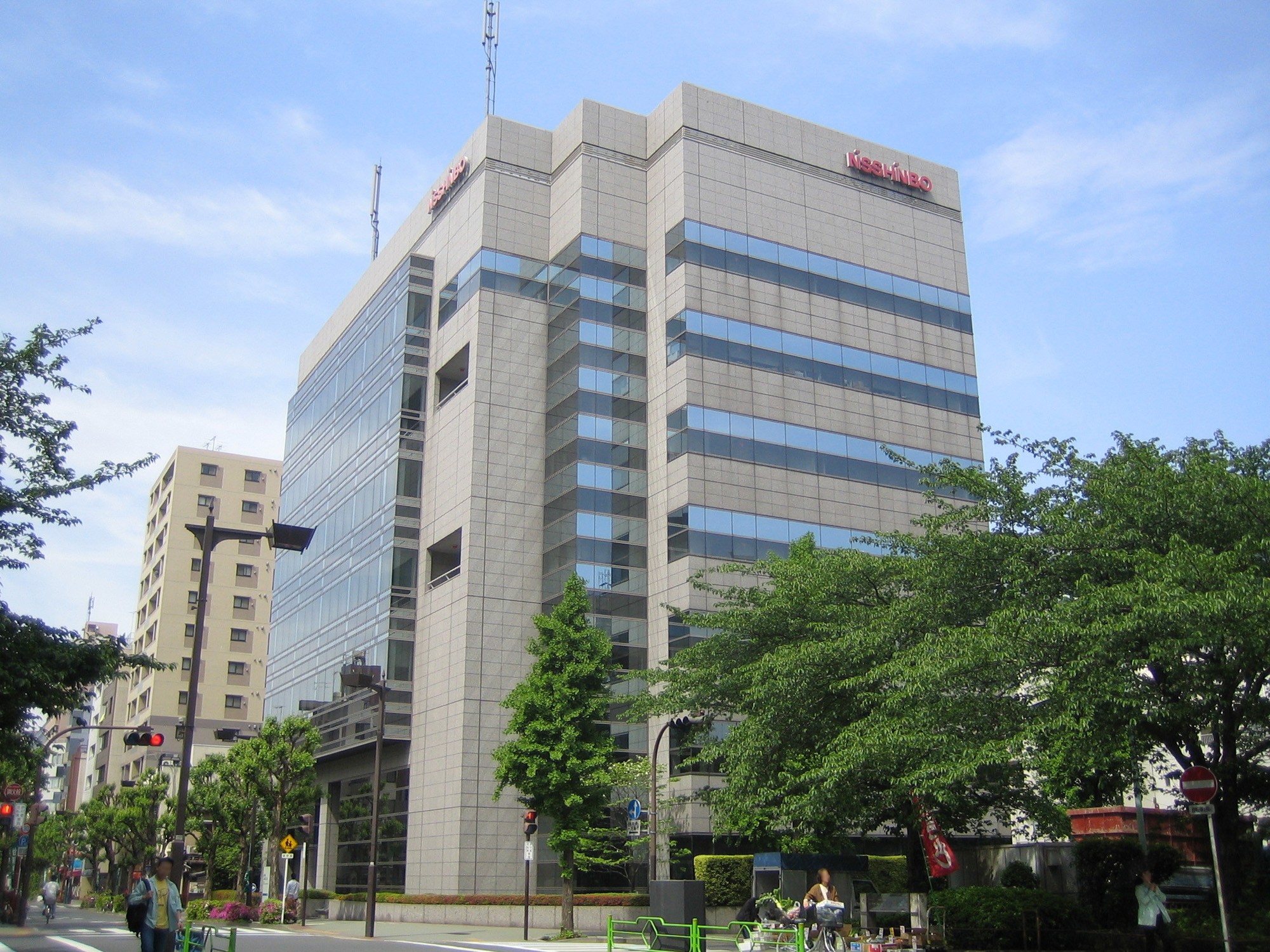
- Nisshinbo headquarters building in Tokyo
- Native name: 日清紡ホールディングス株式会社
- Type: Public (K.K)
- Traded as: TYO: 3105
- ISIN: JP3678000005
- Industry: Diversified industrials
- Founded: February 5, 1907; 119 years ago
- Headquarters: Nihonbashi, Chuo-ku, Tokyo 103-8650, Japan
- Area served: Worldwide
- Key people: Masahiro Murakami (President)
- Products: Electronic components; Friction materials and brake assemblies; Chemicals; Textiles; Mechatronic products
- Services: Leasing and selling of real estate
- Revenue: ▲JPY 533.9 billion (FY 2015) (US$ 4.64 billion) (FY 2015)
- Net income: ▼JPY 10.7 billion (FY 2015) (US$ 93.7 million) (FY 2015)
- Number of employees: 21,112 (as of December 31, 2021)
- Website: Official website

Nisshinbo Holdings Inc. (日清紡ホールディングス株式会社, Nisshinbō Hōrudingusu Kabushiki-gaisha) is a Japanese company formerly listed on the Nikkei 225. It has a diverse line of businesses that include electronics, automobile brakes, mechatronics, chemicals, textiles, papers and real estate.

== History ==
Nisshinbo was established in 1907 as a cotton spinning business, Nisshin Cotton Spinning Co., Ltd. (日清紡績株式会社). It changed its English name to Nisshin Spinning Co., Ltd. in 1962.

In the wake of World War II, Nisshin began to add non-textile segments to its business. Textiles accounted for 90% of its sales in 1960 but only 67% in 1980 and less than half by 1990. During these years, Nisshinbo was part of the Fuyo Group keiretsu headed by Fuji Bank.

In 2009, it adopted a holding company structure and renamed its parent company as Nisshinbo Holdings Inc.

== Products ==
Nisshinbo's textiles business remains active in the development of non-iron fabric, non-woven fabric and elastomers. In 2015 it acquired Tokyoshirts, the largest men's shirt manufacturer/retailer in Japan.

Nisshinbo's electronics business is focused on semiconductors and Wireless equipment. It manufactures drum brakes, disc brakes and friction materials for cars and trucks, as well as toilet paper, wrapping paper, printer paper and other paper products. In 2011 the company acquired TMD Friction and the combined business became the world's largest automotive brake friction manufacturer. It sold TMD Friction again in 2023.

Nisshinbo also operates a real estate arm, Nisshinbo Urban Development, which redevelops former Nisshinbo industrial properties for commercial and residential use.
