= Substitution effect (climate change mitigation) =

Climate change mitigation through use of woody feedstock

The substitution effect (also known as displacement effect), in the climate context, is the reduction of greenhouse gas emissions (mainly carbon dioxide) that occurs when fossil raw materials are entirely or partially replaced by materials based on biogenic (Note: Biogenic denotes the natural formation of material by living organisms, such as trees.) raw material (mainly forest-based products such as wood and wood fibre). Examples include concrete and steel replaced by wood, plastic packaging replaced by paper packaging, fossil diesel replaced by HVO diesel, and oil and coal firing replaced by pellets or woodchips. The substitution effect is therefore a measure of the reduced climate impact that occurs when emission-intensive products are replaced by products with lower net emissions. The substitution effect is one of the three climate benefits of the forest sector and, in the long-term, the most important, as it can consistently and sustainably reduce the fossil emissions that are driving climate change. The forest sector's other two climate benefits are:

- Carbon storage in wood-based products, and
- Carbon sequestration in the world's growing forests.

== Substitution effect increases with efficient use of raw materials ==
The substitution effect is increased through recycling. As an example, an additional substitution effect occurs when paper-based packaging replacing oil-based packaging is recycled and used as material for a new product. This can be repeated until the wood fibre is finally degraded. As a final substitution, the fibre can then be energy recovered through combustion. The substitution effect can also be increased by using wood raw materials more efficiently. With wood-efficient processes and designs (e.g. using half as much wood in paper packaging or wooden building construction), twice as many plastic bags or concrete houses can be replaced with the same amount of wood, thereby doubling the substitution effect.

== Substitution factor ==
A forest product's substitution factor or displacement factor is determined by comparing (Note: In the comparison, emissions of other greenhouse gases are converted into an amount of carbon dioxide with an equivalent climate impact (carbon dioxide equivalents, CO2eq).) the amount of emissions from the production and use of a forest product with its fossil counterpart. A substitution factor of 1 signifies that each carbon atom in the forest product prevents the emission of one fossil carbon atom. As long as the substitution factor is greater than zero, the forest product is reducing fossil carbon emissions. The substitution factor varies widely between different forest products. It also changes as production processes for forest and fossil products evolve. The substitution factor for biofuels from forestry has been found to be 0.8, and for celloluse-based textiles the factor is as high as 2.8. A factor of 1.3–1.6 has been found for construction wood, and a factor of 1.0–1.5 for products such as forest based chemicals, paper and cardboard. In order to simplify calculations and assessments of forest products' climate impact, an average substitution factor of between 0.55 and 1.2 for all product groups has been proposed in review articles based on numerous studies.

== Carbon storage in short- and long-lived forest products ==
The carbon bound in harvested wood continues to be stored throughout the products' lifetime. The length of storage time can be significant for long-lived wood products such as timber-framed buildings and high-quality furniture, or of shorter duration for less sturdy furniture, pallets and packaging wood. Storage time is often no longer than one or a few years for a large proportion of fibre products (e.g. tissue paper, printer paper, cardboard). Most of these short-lived products have the advantage of allowing repeated recycling for use in new products such as cardboard intermediate layers, corrugated cardboard, etc. The storage time for these 'multi-life' products can therefore be extended, although they provide their greatest climate benefit through a repeated substitution effect. Simple biofuels such as wood chips have the shortest average storage time, normally a few months and only seldom exceeding one year.

== Carbon sequestration in growing forests ==
The climate effect of forests occurs through photosynthesis as the trees and other green plants absorb carbon dioxide, a greenhouse gas, from the atmosphere. Carbon is a building block of plant tissue and is stored in plant biomass and as soil organic carbon (SOC) in the ground. The absorption of carbon from the atmosphere and its storage in plants and soil reduces the amount of carbon dioxide in the atmosphere, as long as the sum of carbon in the forest's biomass and SOC increases. Because trees are large, long-lived plants, a vast carbon store can be created in this way. The absorption and storage of atmospheric carbon are two well-recognized climate benefits of growing forests.
