= Photo paper =

Photo paper may refer to:

- Photographic paper, paper coated with light-sensitive chemicals, used for making photographic prints
- Inkjet paper designed for high-quality photographic prints when used in a suitable inkjet printer
