= Double Fold =

2000 non-fiction book by Nicholson Baker

Double Fold: Libraries and the Assault on Paper
- First edition (publ. Random House)
- Author: Nicholson Baker
- Published: 2001 (Random House)
- ISBN: 0-375-50444-3

Double Fold: Libraries and the Assault on Paper is a non-fiction book by Nicholson Baker that was published in April 2001. An excerpt appeared in the July 24, 2000 issue of The New Yorker, under the title "Deadline: The Author's Desperate Bid to Save America's Past". The work details Baker's project to uncover what happened to the thousands of books and newspapers that were replaced during the microfilming boom of the 1980s and 1990s. Double Fold has been a controversial work and Baker states in the preface that it is not meant to be objective: "This isn't an impartial piece of reporting" (p. x). The New York Times characterized the book as a "blistering, and thoroughly idiosyncratic, exposé."

== Overview ==
The term "double fold" refers to the test used by many librarians and preservation administrators to determine the brittleness of paper. The test consists of folding down the corner of a page, then folding it back in the opposite direction. The action is then repeated until the paper breaks or is about to break. The test yields a fold number. This experiment was used by library officials in some cases to justify withdrawing items from the shelves or replacing them with another format (most often microfilm). Baker describes the double fold test as "utter horseshit and craziness. A leaf of a book is a semi-pliant mechanism. It was made for non-acute curves, not for origami." (p. 157).

Baker argues against the destruction of books and newspapers by institutions that, in his view, should be held responsible for their preservation. He calls attention to the tension between preservation and access, and claims these goals need not conflict: "Why can't we have the benefits of the new and extravagantly expensive digital copy and keep the convenience and beauty and historical testimony of the original books resting on the shelves, where they've always been, thanks to the sweat and equity of our prescient predecessors?" (p. 67).

== Themes ==
Baker targets many established institutions in Double Fold, including the British Library, the Library of Congress, and the New York Public Library. He accuses these libraries and others of neglecting to preserve the world's cultural heritage through their policies of discarding original materials once they've been microfilmed, and of creating cumbersome barriers to scholarship and research in the form of illegible and incomplete microfilm.

Baker's also targets the Brittle Books Program, the United States Newspaper Program, the mass deacidification policy practiced by the Library of Congress, and the 1987 film Slow Fires: On the Preservation of the Human Record (p. 184).

Baker's issue with microfilming is not so much with the process itself (p. 25) but with the disbinding and discarding that often went hand-in-hand with the procedure, including the loss of thousands of volumes of significant 19th- and 20th-century newspapers: the Brooklyn Eagle, the New York Herald Tribune, the New York World, the Public Ledger, The New York Times, and others. His other problems with microfilm include cost (p. 26), poor image quality ("edge-blurred, dark, gappy, with text cut off of some pages, faded to the point of illegibility on others," p. 14), and frustration with technology (p. 39).

=== Thoughts about librarians and preservationists ===
Christened the "Erin Brockovich of the library world" by The New York Times, Baker places blame on the complete trust placed in librarians (p. 104). Double Fold was viewed by many as a scathing indictment of librarians and libraries everywhere. The author takes to task many past and present prominent librarians and preservationists, including Verner W. Clapp, Fremont Rider, Patricia Battin, and Pamela Darling.

Baker displays a distaste for library officials who advanced the notion that thousands of books and newspapers were on the verge of disintegrating: "Librarians have lied shamelessly about the extent of paper's fragility" (p. 41). He argues that old books and newspapers—even those printed on acidic paper—can survive much longer than many experts predict, and that librarians who claim otherwise are being alarmist and are misguided in their attempts to justify getting rid of books deemed unhealthy. Baker claims that discarding policies at libraries are the result of increasing pressure on librarians to save space on their shelves, although many are reluctant to admit it.

=== Conclusions ===
Baker makes four recommendations in Double Fold's epilogue: that libraries should be required to publish lists of discarded holdings on their websites, that the Library of Congress should fund a storage repository building for publications and documents not housed on-site, that some U.S. libraries should be designated to save newspapers in bound form, and that both the United States Newspaper Program and the Brittle Books Programs should be abolished unless they can promise that all conservation procedures will be non-destructive and that originals will be saved.

== Critical reception ==
Double Fold won the National Book Critics Circle Award for Nonfiction in 2001, and received positive reviews from The New York Times, Salon, The New York Review of Books, and Library Journal.

== Response from librarians ==
The Association of Research Libraries (ARL) maintained a web page called "Nicholson Baker, Reviews and Responses", that compiled letters to editors, reviews, interviews, and articles in response to Baker's arguments, including a "Q and A" in direct response to the book. In a letter to the editor in The New York Review of Books, Shirley K. Baker, a librarian writing on behalf of ARL, stresses that preservation decisions occur in a larger institutional context, and are concerned with more than just microfilm. She writes that "librarians have used the best knowledge and materials available at any given time to develop a broad array of preservation strategies."

In an editorial titled "Baker's Book Is Half-Baked", published in the May 15, 2001 issue of Library Journal, Francine Fialkoff says that Baker "doesn't understand – and perhaps never will – that the purpose of libraries is access."

In the June 1, 2001 issue of Library Journal, Baker responded to librarians in an interview with writer Andrew Richard Albanese. In the interview Baker states that some reviewers of Double Fold had misrepresented his opinions and that librarians may be reading these misguided reviews and taking offense without having read the book itself.

Later that year, Baker was invited to speak at the annual American Library Association conference in San Francisco. He called himself a "library activist" and reiterated the need for libraries to retain last copies, as well as originals.

Richard Cox, a professor and archivist from the University of Pittsburgh, responded to Double Fold with a book of his own; Vandals in the Stacks: A Response to Nicholson Baker's Assault on Libraries was published in 2002. In 2000, Cox published a critique of Double Fold called "The Great Newspaper Caper: Backlash in the Digital Age" that appeared in the journal First Monday. In both the article and the book, Cox admits that some good could come from public discourse about preservation issues, but maintains that "the problems are much more complex than Mr. Baker understands or cares to discuss." He writes: "one can believe in the continuing utility of print and the value of maintaining books and some newspapers in their original condition, while recognizing that the ultimate preservation demands requires mechanisms like microfilming and digitization projects," and worries that Baker's focus on original formats will "divert the public's attention from the greater issues facing the preservation of the books, documents, newspapers, and other artifacts of the past."

Marlene Manoff writes: "Museums and libraries both are wrestling with the need to democratize and to expand their audiences and to find new sources of funding. Both are exploiting new technologies to transform their internal operations and the nature of the materials and services they provide." Manoff notes that "discarding books and newspapers, however serious a problem, is not itself the destruction of history" but also acknowledges that the call for libraries to take on a stronger role in preserving the historical record is valid.

== American Newspaper Repository ==
In 1999, Baker founded the American Newspaper Repository in order to save some of the collections being auctioned off by the British Library. A year later, he became the owner of thousands of volumes of old newspapers, including various runs of The New York Times, the Chicago Tribune, the New York Herald Tribune, and the New York World. In May 2004, his collection was moved to Duke University, where it is stored on climate-controlled shelves and maintained by the Rare Books and Special Collections division. As part of the gift agreement between the American Newspaper Repository and Duke, the collection is to be kept together in perpetuity, and no disbinding or experimental deacidification is allowed.

== See also ==
- Book scanning
