= Folding endurance =

In paper testing, folding endurance is defined as the logarithm (to the base of ten) of the number of double folds that are required to make a test piece break under standardized conditions:

F = log_{10} d,

where F is the folding endurance and d the number of double folds.

Folding endurance is especially applicable for papers used for maps, bank notes, archival documents, etc. The direction of the grain in relation to the folding line, the type of fibres used, the fibre contents, the calliper of the test piece, etc., as well as which type of folding tester that is used affect how many double folds a test piece can take.

Folding endurance must not be confused with the related term fold number.

== Standards on folding endurance ==
- ISO 5626: Paper – Determination of folding endurance.
- TAPPI Test Method T 511: Folding endurance of paper (MIT tester).
- TAPPI Test Method T 423: Folding endurance of paper (Schopper type tester).

== See also ==
- Fold number
- Double fold
