= Slow fire =

Paper embrittlement of a book or document

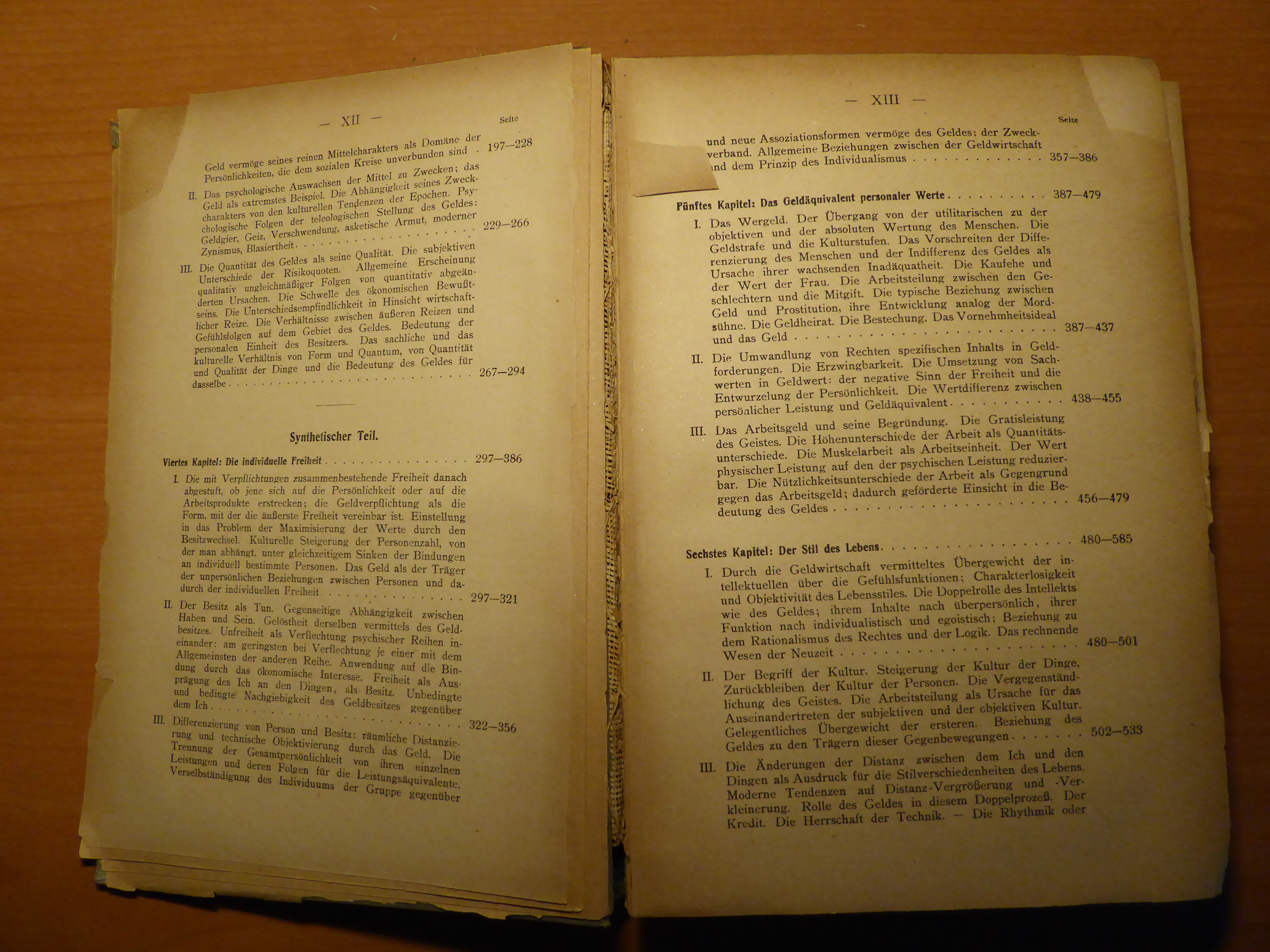
A book printed in 1920 on acid paper that is disintegrating.

Slow fire or acid decay is a term used in library and information science to describe paper embrittlement resulting from acid decay. The term is taken from the title of Terry Sanders's 1987 film Slow Fires: On the preservation of the human record.

Solutions to this problem include the use of acid-free paper stocks, format shifting brittle books by microfilming, photocopying or digitization, and a variety of deacidification techniques.

== History ==
Much of the early paper made from wood pulp contained significant amounts of alum, a variety of aluminium sulfate salt that is significantly acidic. Alum was added to paper to assist in sizing, making it somewhat water resistant so that inks did not "run" or spread uncontrollably. Early papermakers did not realize that the alum they added liberally to cure almost every problem encountered in making their product would be eventually detrimental. The cellulose fibres that make up paper are hydrolyzed by acid, and the presence of alum eventually degrades the fibres until the acidic paper disintegrates in a process known as slow fire. Documents written on rag paper are significantly more stable. The use of non-acidic additives to make paper is becoming more prevalent, and the stability of these papers is less of an issue.

Paper made from mechanical pulp contains significant amounts of lignin, a major component in wood. In the presence of light and oxygen, lignin reacts to give yellow materials, which is why newsprint and other mechanical paper yellows with age. Paper made from bleached kraft or sulfite pulps does not contain significant amounts of lignin and is therefore better suited for books, documents and other applications where whiteness of the paper is essential.

Paper made from wood pulp is not necessarily less durable than a rag paper. The aging behaviour of a paper is determined by its manufacture, not the original source of the fibres. Furthermore, tests sponsored by the Library of Congress prove that all paper is at risk of acid decay, because cellulose itself produces formic, acetic, lactic and oxalic acids.

== See also ==
- Acidic paper
- Acid-free paper
- Double fold
- Wood-pulp paper
- Preservation (library and archive)
