= Patricia Battin =

American librarian (1929–2019)

Patricia Meyer Battin
- Born: June 2, 1929; Gettysburg, Pennsylvania, U.S.
- Died: April 22, 2019 (aged 89); Mitchellville, Maryland, U.S.
- Education: Swarthmore College, University of Minnesota
- Known for: Introduction of digital technology in libraries, book preservation
- Awards: National Humanities Medal (1999)
- Scientific career
- Fields: Information science, libraries
- Workplaces: Columbia University, Emory University, Commission on Preservation and Access

Patricia Meyer Battin (June 2, 1929 – April 22, 2019) was one of the first librarians in the United States to combine the responsibilities of library administrator and technology director. Her focus shifted toward preservation when she became the first president of the Commission on Preservation and Access. She later became a pioneer in the digital library movement and began to work in the area of digital preservation.

== Early life and education ==
Patricia Battin was born to Emanuel Albert and Josephine (Lehman) Meyer on June 2, 1929, in Gettysburg, Pennsylvania. She attended Swarthmore College from 1947 to 1951 and received a B.A. in English. The following year, she attended the University of Minnesota to pursue American studies.

== Career ==
In 1964, Battin began her career in library services as an intern at the Binghamton University. While continuing her work at Binghamton, she attended classes at Syracuse University and, in 1967, earned an M.S. in library science. With her library degree, Battin was promoted from library trainee to assistant librarian and, from 1967 to 1974, she continued to move through the ranks at Binghamton, holding the titles assistant librarian for cataloging and assistant director for reader services.

Battin then went on to Columbia University where she was Director of Library Services from 1974 to 1978. In 1978, she took on the additional role of Vice President for Information Services, making her one of the first librarians with the dual responsibility of library administration and technology services. While still at Columbia in 1982, Battin was interim president of the Research Libraries Group. She left Columbia University in 1987 to become the first president of the Commission on Preservation and Access (CPA).

Battin directed the CPA in its comprehensive efforts to battle the acid paper problem. She was instrumental in organizing a national campaign for the use of alkaline paper in publishing companies. In 1988, on behalf of the Association of Research Libraries, the Commission on Preservation and Access and the National Humanities Alliance, Battin testified before the U.S. House of Representatives' Subcommittee on Interior and Related Agencies (Committee on Appropriations) to propose a collaborative approach to preserving the nation's brittle books and to ask for an increase in federal funding for preservation microfilming. Her testimony led to an increased appropriation of $8 million and the "twenty-year brittle books preservation plan to microfilm three million endangered volumes, via the National Endowment for the Humanities Brittle Books Program. For her work with the CPA, Battin was named ACRL/Baker & Taylor Academic or Research Librarian of the Year in 1990.

In 1994, Battin retired from the CPA and accepted a position at Emory University, where she became the planning director for the three-year Virtual Library Project. The National Digital Library Federation was formed in 1995, and Battin was appointed as coordinator for six months. The same year, Battin submitted a written statement on the FY-1996 Appropriation for the National Endowment for the Humanities to the U.S. House of Representatives' Subcommittee on Interior and Related Agencies (Committee on Appropriations) celebrating the successes of NEH's preservation activities and asking Congress to continue funding this work.

== Awards and recognition ==
In 1993, Battin received an honorary L.H.D. from Emory University.

Battin was awarded the 1999 National Humanities Medal for her "exemplary public service by organizing and leading a national campaign to save millions of brittle books in America's libraries and archives." The next year, the Frye Leadership Institute was formed through a collaboration among the Council on Library and Information Resources (CLIR), EDUCAUSE and Emory University. The Patricia M. Battin Scholarship was created to provide tuition assistance for individuals whose institutions lack funding, and its purpose is to "foster ethnic, racial, and gender diversity, as well as diversity in professional and scholarly background or type of institution."

== Death ==
Patricia Battin died of heart-related complications in Mitchellville, Maryland on April 22, 2019, at the age of 89.

== Selected bibliography ==
- Battin, Patricia (1982). "Preservation: The forgotten problem". In Galvin, Thomas J.; Lynch, Beverly P. (eds.). Priorities for Academic Libraries. San Francisco: Jossey-Bass.
- Battin, Patricia (1989). "Crumbling Books". Change. 21 (5): 6, 56. doi:10.1080/00091383.1989.9939170.
- Battin, P., Helal, A.H., & Weiss, J.W. (1995, Oct.). Electronic documents and information: From preservation to access. Presented at the 18th International Essen Symposium.
- Battin, P., & Reed-Scott, J. (1989, May). Back to the future: Knowing and preserving your collection. Recording of the Amigos Spring Technical Session held in Addison, Texas.
- Battin, P.; Sitts, M.K. (1989). "Institutions have moral responsibility to preserve great book collections". Educational Record. 70 (2): 54–55.
- Hawkins, B.L., & Battin, P. (1998). The Mirage of Continuity: Reconfiguring Academic Information Resources for the 21st Century. Council on Library and Information Resources Association of American Universities: Washington, D.C.
