= Mass deacidification =

Measure against the degradation of books made of acidic paper

Mass deacidification is a term used in library and information science as one possible measure against the degradation of paper in old books, the so-called "slow fires". The goal of the process is to increase the pH of acidic paper. Although acid-free paper has become more common, a large body of acidic paper still exists in books made after the 1850s; this is because of its cheaper and simpler production methods. Acidic paper, especially when exposed to light, air pollution, or high relative humidity, yellows and becomes brittle over time. During mass deacidification an alkaline agent is deposited in the paper to neutralize existing acid and prevent further decay. Mass deacidification is intended for objects on acidic paper that will be lost if no action is performed.

== History of research and process development ==
Mass deacidification—along with microfilm and lamination—was developed during the early and mid-20th century as a response to the chemical process of hydrolysis by which the fibers that constitute paper, providing its structure and strength, have their bonds broken, resulting in paper that becomes increasingly brittle over time. Environmental pollutants can react with paper to form acids that promote oxidation, creating more acid as a by-product, which results in a positive feedback loop of autocatalytic destruction. Supported in part by grants from the Council on Library Resources, William J. Barrow conducted research into paper decay and found that no more than three percent of books published between 1900 and 1949 would survive more than fifty years. In response to this, a Standing Committee on the Preservation of Research Library Materials was formed by the Association of Research Libraries (ARL) in 1960.

Barrow also invented an aqueous process to neutralize acid in paper while depositing an alkaline buffer that would slow the rate of decay. In addition to Barrow's original method, both non-aqueous—employing organic solvents—and vaporous—the Library of Congress' DEZ (diethyl zinc) treatment—methods of achieving the same results have been researched in an attempt to reduce time, labor, and cost requirements.

One technique proposed is to place books in an evacuated chamber, then introduce diethylzinc (DEZ). In theory, the diethylzinc would react with acidic residues in the paper, leaving an alkaline residue that would protect the paper against further degradation. In practice, the heating required to remove trace water from the books before reaction (DEZ reacts violently with water) caused an accelerated degradation of the paper, a series of chemical reactions between DEZ and other components of the book (glues, bindings), caused further damage, and produced unpleasant aromas. In the 1980s, a pilot plant for mass deacidification, using this process, was constructed by NASA and was tested on books provided by the Library of Congress. In 1986 it was discovered that the DEZ had not been removed in one of the deacidification runs and pooled in the bottom of the chamber, possibly remaining within the plumbing. DEZ is violently flammable when it comes in contact with either oxygen or water vapor, so the vacuum chamber could not be opened to remove the books within. Eventually, explosives were used to rupture the suspect plumbing; suspicions of the presence of residual DEZ were confirmed by the subsequent fire that destroyed the plant. In his book Double Fold, Nicholson Baker discusses the failure of the NASA program at great length.

The chemical company AkzoNobel made later attempts at refining the process. The risks of fire and explosions were reduced by a better process design, however, damage and odors remained a problem. In the end, AkzoNobel determined the process was not a viable commercial proposition and shut down their research at the end of 1994.

== Goals ==
These are the results that the Library of Congress expected of an ideal mass deacidification treatment in 1994:

- neutralize acidic paper and add an alkaline reserve.
- produce a pH value between 6.8 and 10.4 that is evenly distributed throughout the book.
- should not cause any damage to adhesives, inks, or dyes.
- should not cause an odor or any change in the color of the paper.
- should not cause loss of pliancy or mechanical strength.

Faculty members of the Slovak University of Technology added these further requirements:

- the chemicals used have to be safe.
- the process has to be able to be applied to any kind of paper.
- the process can not cause swelling or warping of the paper.

== Effects ==
All of the processes imparted an adequately high pH in studies conducted by the European Commission on Preservation and Access, the Library of Congress, and a team of scientists from the Centre de Recherches sur la Conservation des Documents Graphiques in the early and mid-nineties. BookKeeper produced a pH of 9–10. CSC Book Saver yielded a pH of 8.78–10.5. Wei T'o gives 7.5 to 10.4, and Papersave gives a pH of 7.5–9.

The same studies also found that the processes had adverse cosmetic side effects. BookKeeper left "a palpable residue", clamp marks on the covers, and caused some of the colored inks to rub off. CSC Book Saver left a "white powdery deposit" on books. Papersave caused "discoloration, white deposit, Newton's rings, bleeding of inks and dyes, odor and different 'feel' of the paper." Wei T'o caused "odor, white residues, rings, cockling, (yellow) discolorations and adhesive bleeding."

Conservators from the British Library acknowledge that the existing mass deacidification processes are still being developed and further research needs to be conducted on their chemical and mechanical effects.

== Services ==
Several commercial deacidification techniques are on the market as of 2008:

- The BookKeeper process is a non-aqueous, liquid phase process that uses magnesium oxide. BookKeeper is available through Preservation Technologies, L.P. with plants in the U.S., Spain, Japan, Poland, The Netherlands, South Africa, Qatar. Another plant is available through Fratielivi in Italy.
- The CSC Book Saver uses carbonated magnesium propylate for deacidification. The CSC Book Saver is available in Europe through Conservación de Sustratos Celulósicos S.L. (CSC) (Barcelona, Spain).
- The Papersave process was developed by Battelle Ingenieurtechnik GmbH and is, therefore, sometimes referred to as "the Battelle Process". The process uses magnesium titanium alkoxide. The Papersave process is available in Europe through Nitrochemie Wimmis (Wimmis, Switzerland) under the name of Papersave Swiss and the Zentrum für Bucherhaltung (Leipzig, Germany).
- The Wei T'o process uses methoxy magnesium methyl carbonate, or isopropoxy magnesium isopropyl carbonate, and new products are coming out in 2008. Wei T'o is less commonly used for mass deacidification treatment than for single item deacidification. Wei T'o products are available through Wei T'o Associates Inc. (Matteson, US).

BookKeeper, CSC Booksaver, Papersave, and Wei T'o are also available as hand-held sprays.

== Adoption and costs ==
While deacidification has been adopted by major research libraries such as the Library of Congress and the New York Public Library, it is not clear whether many archives, particularly those in the United States, have followed suit. Some European national archives have tested deacidification techniques. The United States' National Archives and Records Administration (NARA), which pioneered an aqueous technique that improved upon Barrow's, chose to invest its preservation dollars elsewhere. In 2000, the Chief of the NARA Document Conservation Laboratory defended the lack of a mass deacidification program by pointing to differences between library and archival collections. For example, noting that many of the papers coming to NARA were of a higher quality than those in library collections; that the Archives does not receive records from federal government agencies until they are at least 30 years old, by which time acidic paper will have already been irrevocably weakened, and that limited resources might best be applied elsewhere, such as climate control. Under the Archives' Twenty-Year Preservation Plan, emphasis was placed on achieving the "maximum benefit for the greatest number of records."

Though now dated, several sources estimate the costs and suitability of deacidification treatment. Studies conducted by the Harry Ransom Humanities Research Center and the General State Archive of the Netherlands found the DEZ method might be particularly applicable to archival materials. It was estimated that deacidification costs, excluding transportation and handling, during the early 1990s was $5–10 per volume. During 1995–1997, the Library of Congress received $2 million in appropriations to deacidify 72,000 books using the Bookkeeper commercial method and evaluate alternative methods. The actual cost per book was $11.70. Finally, a 2003 cost comparison with reformatting options per volume yielded $125 for microfilming, $50 for scanning and minimal indexing and, based on a New York Public Library project, $16.20 for deacidification. However, already in 2004 Google Books was able to scan for only $10-$20 per book.

As of 2022, there were five mass deacidification plants in the world.

== See also ==
- Preservation (library and archive)
- Double Fold
- Paper
- Pulp (paper)
- Preservation survey
- Foxing
- Rare Books and Manuscripts Section
- Paper Chemicals
