= United States Permanent Paper Law =

Law specifying paper for federal records

The U.S. Permanent Paper Law, or P.L. 101-423, is a joint resolution calling for the use of acid-free paper for federal records, books, and "publications of enduring value." It was signed into law by President George H.W. Bush in October 1990.

== Provisions ==
At first, in order to comply with the law, the acid-free paper or alkaline paper must meet standard JCP A 270 (JCP: Joint Committee on Printing) which is based on an ANSI standard (Z39.48-1984). JCP A 270 differs from Z39.48-1984 in that it is generally more demanding. Through later discussions a number of more lenient standards were created for different levels of documents. These include JCP A560 and JCP O-560. JCP O-560 relates specifically to paper used in photocopiers and laser printers. Written into the law was a provision that the heads of the Library of Congress, National Archives, and Government Printing Office were to report on how well the law was being implemented. The reports were to come out for the years 1991, 1993, and 1995.

== History ==
In a way, this law can be seen as an attempt to officiate a trend that was already beginning to take place in the publishing world. In fact, before this law went into place, the Government Printing Office was able to determine that already the majority of paper being supplied to them was alkaline. The bill began as 101 S.J.Res. 57 in the United States Senate and 101 H.J.Res. 226 in the House of Representatives.

- May 1988 – reports published on "Book Preservation Technologies"
- May 4, 1989 – hearing before the Subcommittee on Science, Research, and Technology
- July 31, 1989 – 101 S.J.Res. 57 considered and passed in the Senate
- February 21, 1990 – hearing before the Subcommittee on Government Information, Justice, and Agriculture
- August 22, 1990 – a report was submitted to Congress titled: "Establishing a National Policy on Permanent Paper"
- September 17, 1990 – House considered 101 H.J. Res. 226 and decided to pass 101 S.J.Res. 57 with amendments instead
- September 26, 1990 – Senate concurred on the House Amendments
- April 22, 1999 – Paper specifications were modified to include at least 30% post-consumer content to comply with President Clinton's Executive Order 13101

== Issues ==
In the report filed for 1991, two related issues arose. First, it is difficult and yet paramount to know at its creation how much enduring value a document will have. A solution to this problem would be to implement a system where all paper was permanent paper. The second issue is the cost of permanent paper, which in 1991, cost 30% more than acidic paper, thus making such a system not feasible. A recommendation was made to use a cheap but still alkaline paper for all publishing and permanent paper for the publishing of materials with known enduring value.
