= Printer paper =

Printer paper may refer to:

- Inkjet paper, for inkjet printers
- Copy paper, for laser printers
- Continuous stationery, designed for use with dot-matrix and line printers with pin- or sprocket-feed mechanisms
