= Paper splitting =

Method of preserving brittle paper

Paper splitting is a method of preserving brittle papers often found in library and archival materials. In this process, the front and back of a sheet of paper are split apart. A piece of acid-free paper is placed between these two sides of an acidic sheet before the pages are reconnected. The intention is to reduce the acid deterioration in the paper. A paper-splitting machine has been developed, but is not in wide use.

The sheet of paper to be restored is placed in a special bath so that it swells and harmful substances are washed out of the paper. Then the front and back are each covered with a gelatine-based lamination paper (backing paper), with the lamination papers being pressed together in a hydraulic press. The lamination papers are then pulled apart and the paper to be restored is split. As an alternative to the bath, two moistened lamination papers can be applied to both sides so that the moisture can penetrate the work of art. As the sheet swells, it can be pulled apart and split in half. A thin, acid-free and buffered Japanese paper (core sheet) is then glued in between under pressure, thus reconnecting the two original paper halves. Calcium carbonate in the core sheet bond acts as a buffer against future acids. In the final step, the laminating papers are removed again in an immersion bath with enzymes, dissolving the gelatine glue.
