= Double fold =

Process used in paper quality testing

How a double fold is made using a test piece (seen from the side).

A double fold is made by first folding the test piece backwards and then forwards to its initial position (one complete oscillation).

A double fold is a process of folding a paper sample first backwards and then forwards about the same line, i.e. one complete oscillation. The number of double folds that is required to make a test piece break is used to determine the material's folding endurance and fold number.

The total folding angle (about the folding line) differs depending on which folding tester is used, for instance the Köhler–Molin instrument folds about 156° on each side of the vertical line, resulting in a complete oscillation of about 2 × 312° for each double fold, while the MIT instrument employs a folding angle of about 135° on each side (that is, a complete oscillation of about 2 × 270° for each complete double fold).

Strictly speaking, the first double fold is more than one complete oscillation since the flap needs to be folded from vertical to its starting position before the counting begins.

The process was analyzed and criticized by Nicholson Baker in his 2001 book Double Fold: Libraries and the Assault on Paper.
