= Amalfi paper =

Type of paper

Machinery from the exhibition at the Paper Museum, housed in a former paper mill, Amalfi

Amalfi paper (Italian: Carta Bambagina) is a valuable type of paper produced in Amalfi, Italy since the Middle Ages.

Documents report its presence in Italy since the thirteenth century, although it seems that the paper mills of the maritime republic of Amalfi were active before that time.

Its use was forbidden in 1220 by Holy Roman Emperor Frederick II as less durable than parchment. However, it continued to be produced, and in the eighteenth century twenty mills were active in Amalfi and nearby cities. Sheets of ancient Bambagina paper, despite the prohibition, survive and host documents from the fourteenth century.

== Production ==
Amalfi paper owes its second name, Carta Bambagina, to the specific production process which, apart from the use of cellulose from wood, is based on the processing of rags, tatters of linen, cotton and hemp white. These fabrics were once pulped with hammers moved by hydraulic-powered mills (still visible in the area). Later, more sophisticated machinery (electrical) allowed greater refinement. The fabrics beaten down to fine pulp formed a slurry. The slurry in water is transformed by hand into sheets by means of frames formed by wires of brass and bronze. The facility is still in working condition making Bambagina paper.
