= Kier (industrial) =

Rotating boiler or vat used in bleaching or scouring cotton fabric

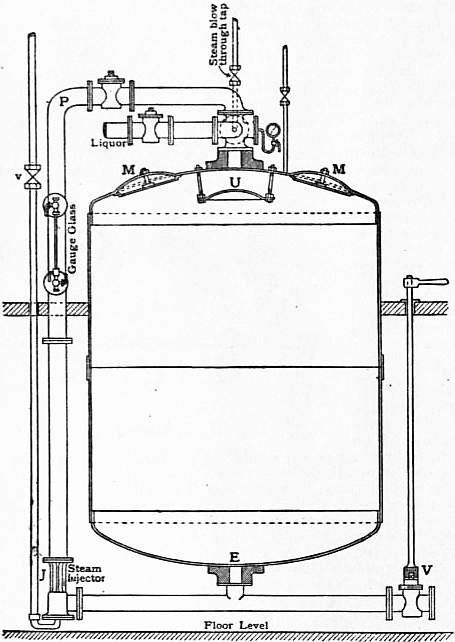
High Pressure Blow-through Kier

A kier, keir or keeve (or similar spellings) is a large circular boiler or vat used in bleaching or scouring cotton fabric. They were also used for processing paper pulp.

In use they were continuously rotated by an engine, steam being supplied through a rotating joint in the axle. They were usually spherical, sometimes cylindrical, and some were recycled from old boiler shells.

== Kier boiling ==
Kier, the cylindrical-shaped vessel, straight, with egg-shaped ends made of boiler may have the capacity to process one to three tons of material at a time.

Kier boiling and ''Boiling off'' is the scouring process that involves boiling the materials with the caustic solution in the Kier, which is an enclosed vessel, so that the fabric can boil under pressure. Open kiers were also used with temperatures below 100°C (at atmospheric pressure).

== Gallery ==
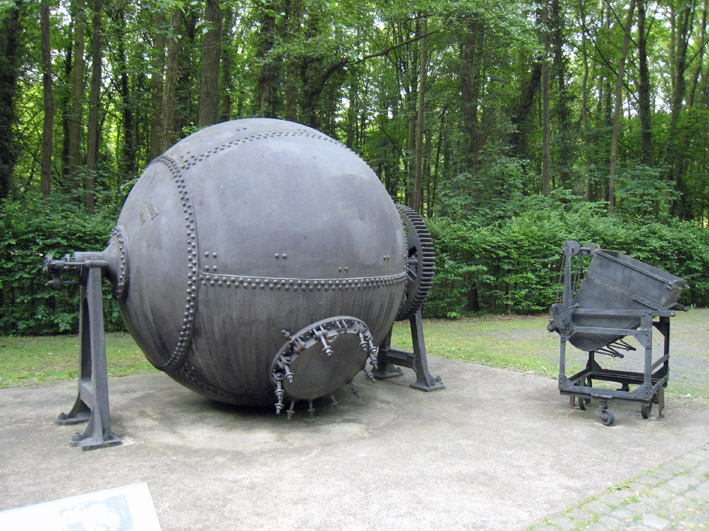
Spherical kier

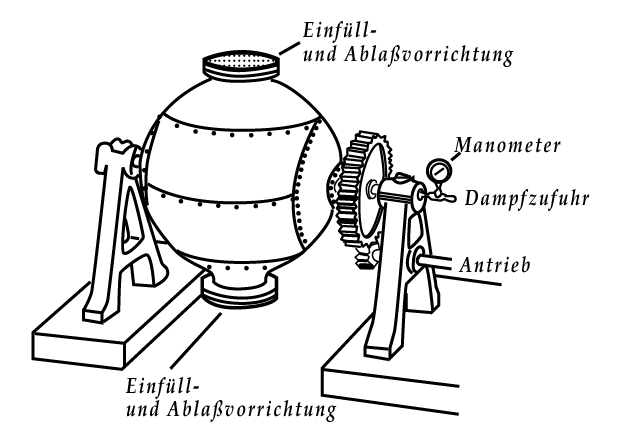

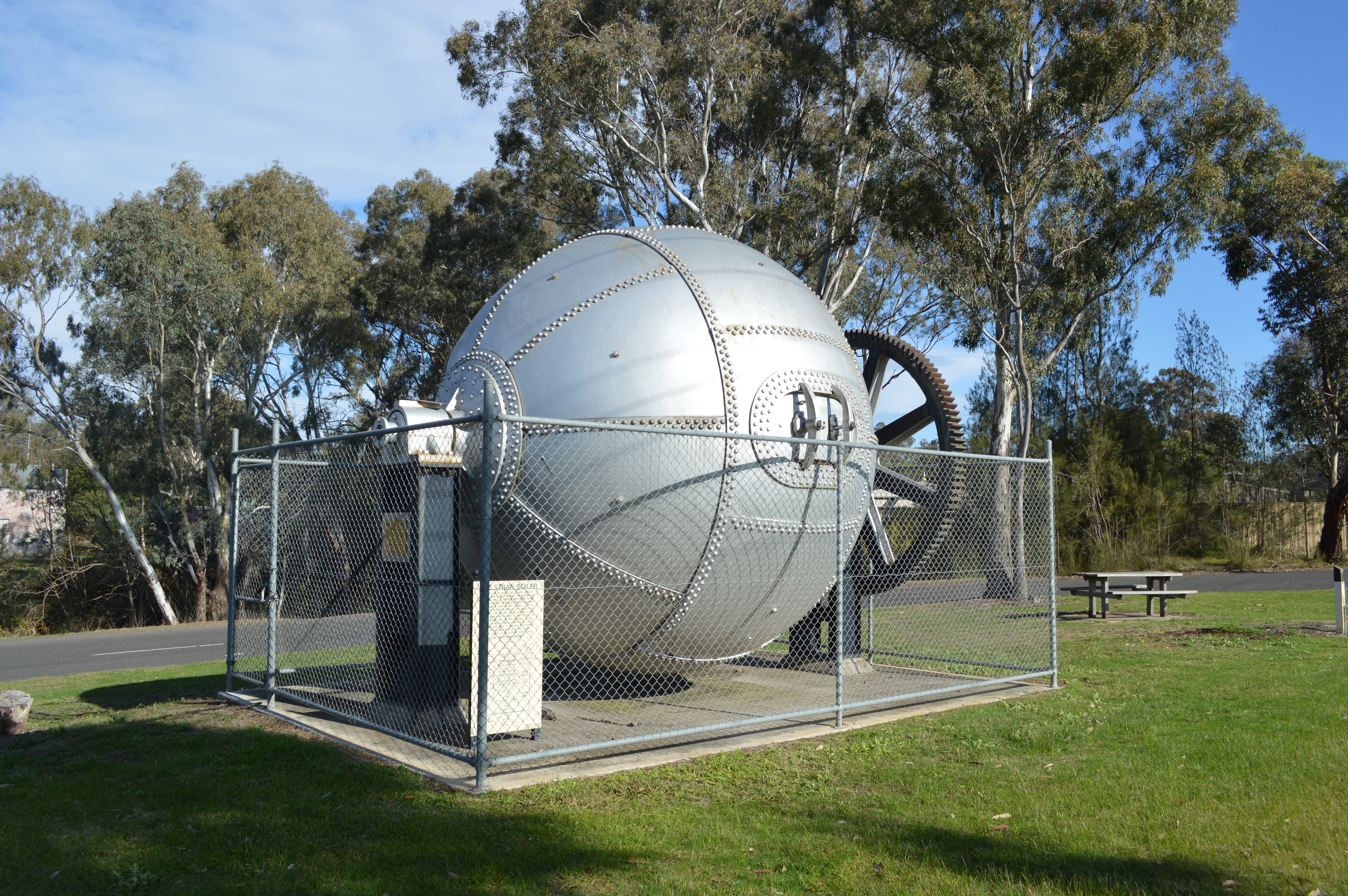
Straw boiler at the historical precinct at Broadford, Victoria

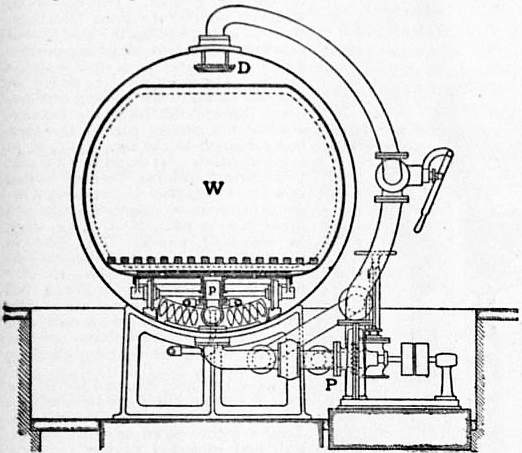
The Mather Kier, cross section

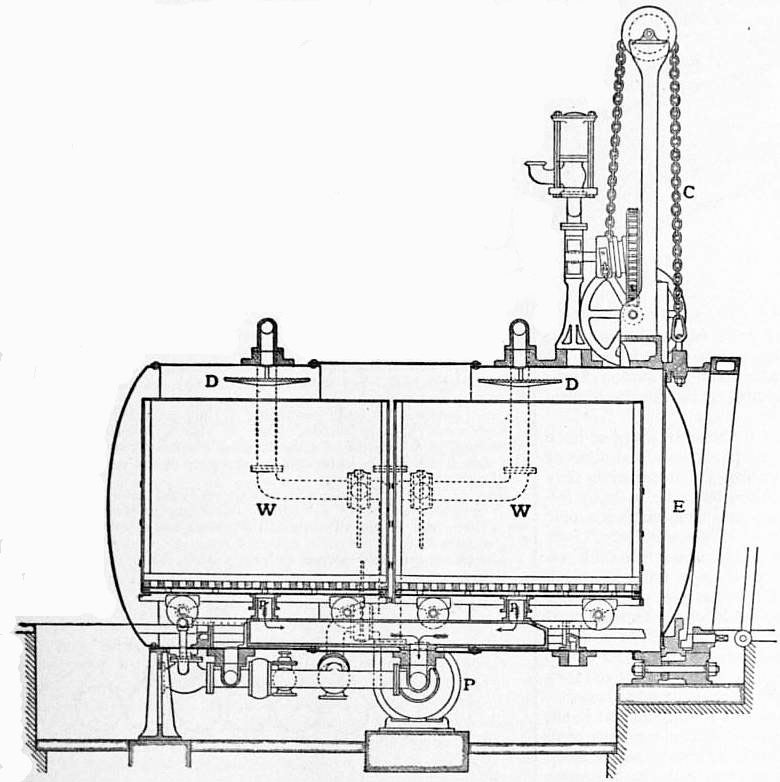
The Mather Kier, longitudinal section

== See also ==
- Textile finishing
- Textile bleaching
