= Preservation survey =

Collection of data about library materials

Preservation survey (also known as condition survey, conservation needs survey or preservation assessment) is the process of collecting and analyzing data about the physical condition of library materials.

Preservation surveys are used by libraries to determine the condition of their collections and identify necessary actions for preserving, conserving or repairing materials. They are most often conducted at research and university libraries.

Preservation surveys are often the first step when planning and implementing a preservation program in a library. By collecting data and compiling statistics about a collection’s condition, library staff can determine environmental threats and preservation needs. It is also possible to use the resulting data to predict future deterioration.

Since preservation needs usually well exceed an institution’s resources, the data acquired in an assessment can aid libraries in establishing priorities in regard to deteriorating materials. As Ross Harvey wrote in his Preservation in Libraries, the data from surveys can "be used to plan how best to deploy available resources."

== History ==
The need for surveying library materials was born of the increasing awareness of the problem of brittle books. William Barrow’s Deterioration of Book Stock: Problems and Remedies from 1959 alerted the library world to the alarmingly short shelf life of books composed of acidic paper. While major libraries had estimated high percentages of acidic books, it wasn’t until 1979 that an empirical study was conducted on a library collection to determine its condition. This study, at Stanford University’s Green Library, was a benchmark in the field and established the methodology for conducting preservation surveys in research libraries.

Yale University conducted a large-scale assessment of its library materials in 1985 that is also considered a landmark in the field. Yale’s survey sounded the warning bell for research libraries worldwide, discovering that 86% of the more than 36,500 books in the sample were either brittle or composed of paper with an acidic pH.

== Conducting a Survey ==
Many preservation surveys are conducted by collecting data on a random sample of items. University librarians may consult with the institution’s statistics department to design a reliable sampling plan. A random sample may be derived by the randomization of call numbers, by the creation of a sampling frame that assigns a unique number to each item in the target population or by generating random numbers and locating volumes by counting on the shelf.

A pilot survey of a small sample population may be run prior to the actual survey in order to address any problems with the sampling plan or the survey questions. The pilot survey may reveal unclear or ambiguous wording, superfluous questions, or existing conditions that have not been addressed.

After the pilot survey, the library may hold a workshop to train surveyors to properly collect data and handle materials.
