= Acid-free paper =

Type of paper used for preservation

The acid-free-paper symbol; U+267E ♾ PERMANENT PAPER SIGN

Acid-free paper is paper that, if infused in water, yields a neutral or basic pH (7 or slightly greater). It can be made from any cellulose fiber as long as the active acid pulp is eliminated during processing. Acid-free paper addresses part of the problem of preserving documents and preserving artwork for long periods. Archival paper has a more exacting specification and is expected to last even longer.

== Overview ==
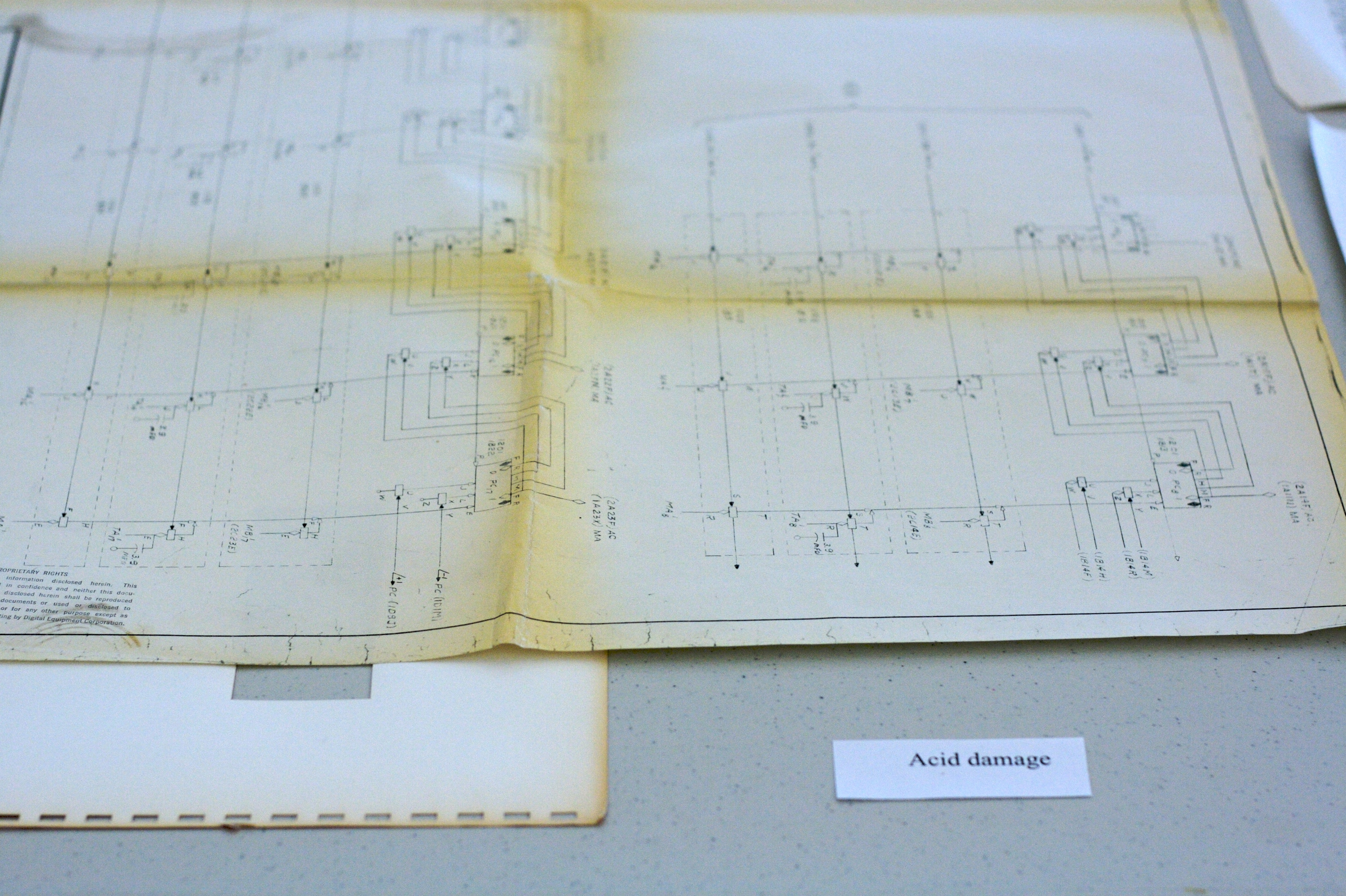
Paper showing acid damage from the cardboard box in which it was stored

Paper made from wood-based pulp that has not had its lignin removed succumbs to slow fire: it turns yellow, becomes brittle and deteriorates. When exposed to light and/or heat, the molecules in the acidic paper will break down faster. Acidic wood-pulp paper became commonplace in the late 19th century, and in the 1930s, William Barrow (a chemist and librarian) published a report about the deterioration of acidic paper in the libraries. For fear of the gradual disintegration of written materials, measures have since been taken to improve the quality of paper.

During production, acid-free paper may be treated with a mild base (usually calcium or magnesium bicarbonate) to neutralize the natural acids occurring in wood pulp, and it may also be buffered to prevent the formation of additional acids (as may develop from the application of sizing).

The bicarbonate is added in excess, to supply the paper with an alkaline reserve to provide protection from further attack by acids remaining in the paper or supplied by the environment (e.g. atmospheric sulfur dioxide). The bicarbonate during drying loses carbon dioxide and water and is converted to calcium carbonate or magnesium carbonate. For paper to last at least 100 years it must have an alkaline reserve of 2 percent or more.

Much commercially produced paper is acid-free but this is largely the result of a shift from kaolin clay to precipitated calcium carbonate (PCC) as the main filler material in the pulp. PCC reacts with acids and requires the pulp to be chemically neutral or alkaline. The sizing additives mixed into the pulp and/or applied to the surface of the paper must also be acid-free.

Alkaline paper has a life expectancy of over 1,000 years for the best paper and 500 years for average grades. The making of alkaline paper has several other advantages in addition to the preservation benefits afforded to the publications and documents printed on it. Because there are fewer corrosive chemicals used in making alkaline paper, the process is much easier on the machinery, reducing downtime and maintenance and extending machines' useful life. The process is also significantly more environmentally friendly. Waste water and byproducts of the paper making process can be recycled; energy can be saved in the drying and refining process; and alkaline paper can be more easily recycled.

== Standards ==
=== Permanent paper ===
The company Hercules Incorporated developed the first alkaline sizing in the 1950s that made acid-free paper possible. Despite the advances in paper making and the identification of and concern around the brittle book problem, it took decades before the adoption of ANSI NISO Standard Z39.48-1984 - Permanence of Paper for Publications and Documents in Libraries in 1984. This voluntary standard covered pH value, tear resistance, alkaline reserve, and lignin thresholds for paper to last thousands of years and was developed to encourage the use of acid-free paper in library materials. The development of the initial standard was a result of the work of the Council on Library Resources, which effectively lobbied ANSI to adopt the guidelines.

In 1986, Standards Committee II of NISO was established to expand Z39.48-1984 to develop standards for coated paper, and was again called upon in 1988 to review and revise the standards for uncoated paper.

There are various standards for "acid-free" paper, with differing requirements. In some quarters, slightly-acidic paper having a pH between 6 and 7 is often also considered "acid-free". Acid-free (alkaline) paper that additionally is uncoated and meets certain standards for folding and tearing is authorized by the American National Standards Institute (ANSI) to carry the following notice: "The paper used in this publication meets the minimum requirements of the American National Standard for Information Sciences—Permanence of Paper for Printed Library Materials, ANSI/NISO Z39.48-1992."

The objective of ANSI Z39.48-1992 " is to establish criteria for coated and uncoated paper to last several hundred years" under optimal conditions in libraries and archives. The desired outcome of the standard is to reduce future preservation problems.

The scope of the standard is to cover publications and documents bought and maintained by libraries and archives. Such works include scholarly journals, periodicals, monographs, government documents, original documents, and significant works in fiction and non-fiction.

An equivalent international standard, ISO 9706, was published in 1994.

Manufacturers of acid-free paper can indicate the compliance of their product with the test requirements of the ISO 9706 or ANSI Z39.48-1992 standards using a circled infinity symbol (Unicode code point 267E, ♾).

=== Archival paper ===
Archival paper is an especially long-life, durable acid-free paper. Archival paper is meant to be used for publications of high legal, historical, or significant value. In the USA, such paper must also be approved in accordance with the ANSI standards. The international standard for "permanent" paper is ISO 9706 and for "archival" paper, the standard is ISO 11108.

Often, cotton rag paper is used for archival purposes, as it is not made from wood-based pulp. Thus, "archival paper" is sometimes broken down into two categories:

- Conservation-grade—acid-free, buffered paper made from wood-based pulp.
- Archival-grade (also Museum-grade)—cotton rag paper made from cotton pulp.

== Deacidification ==
The mass deacidification of collections is spreading in many large heritage institutions around the world.

== See also ==
- Acidic paper – Phenomenon with acid in paper pulp
- Paper chemicals – Chemicals used in paper manufacturing
- Preservation (library and archival science) – Set of activities aimed at prolonging the life of a record or object
- Print permanence – Longevity of printed material
- United States Permanent Paper Law – Law specifying paper for federal records
- Vellum – Animal skin used as a writing material
