= Fold number =

Measure of endurance of a paper sample

Fold number refers to how many double folds that are required to cause rupture of a paper test piece under standardized conditions. Fold number is defined in ISO 5626:1993 as the antilogarithm of the mean folding endurance:

$f=\text{antilog}_{10} \frac{\textstyle\sum_{i=1}^n F_i}{n}=10^{\frac{\textstyle\sum_{i=1}^n F_i}{n}}$

where f is the fold number, F_{i} is the folding endurance for each test piece and n is total number of test pieces used.

In the introduction of ISO 5626:1993 it is emphasized that fold number, as defined in that very International Standard, does not equal the mean number of double folds observed. The latter is however still the definition used in some countries. If the numerical value of the folding endurance is not rounded off, these will however be equal.

In the former Swedish standard SS 152005 ("Pappersordlista") from 1992, with paper related terms defined in Swedish and English, fold number is explained as "the number of double folds which a test strip withstands under specified conditions before a break occurs in the strip"; that is, not the antilogarithm of the mean folding endurance.

== See also ==
- Folding endurance
- Double fold
