= Special fine paper =

Classification of paper

Special fine paper is a classification of paper used for copying and digital printing.

== Copy paper ==
Copy paper is used for copying and laser printers. The basis weight is 70-90 g/m^{2} (approximately 18-24 lb) and ISO brightness 80-96%. It is made of 90–100% virgin chemical pulp or 100% deinked pulp with total pigment content of 10-15%. The most important quality is smooth run in a copying machine / printer and good dimensional stability. It must not show curling or cockling, nor may it retain dust.

== Digital printing paper ==
Digital printing paper is also called electronic printing paper. The basis weight is 40-400 g/m^{2}. This paper quality may be either coated or uncoated. The demands of the paper may vary substantially depending on printing method: electrical charge, thermal, magnetic or ink-jet. All require good dimensional stability, no curling or cockling, good surface strength and surface smoothness. For ink-jet paper it is also important with sufficient and uniform porosity to counteract spreading of the ink.

== See also ==
- Coated fine paper
- Inkjet paper
- Thermal paper
