= Inkjet paper =

Paper designed for use with inkjet printers

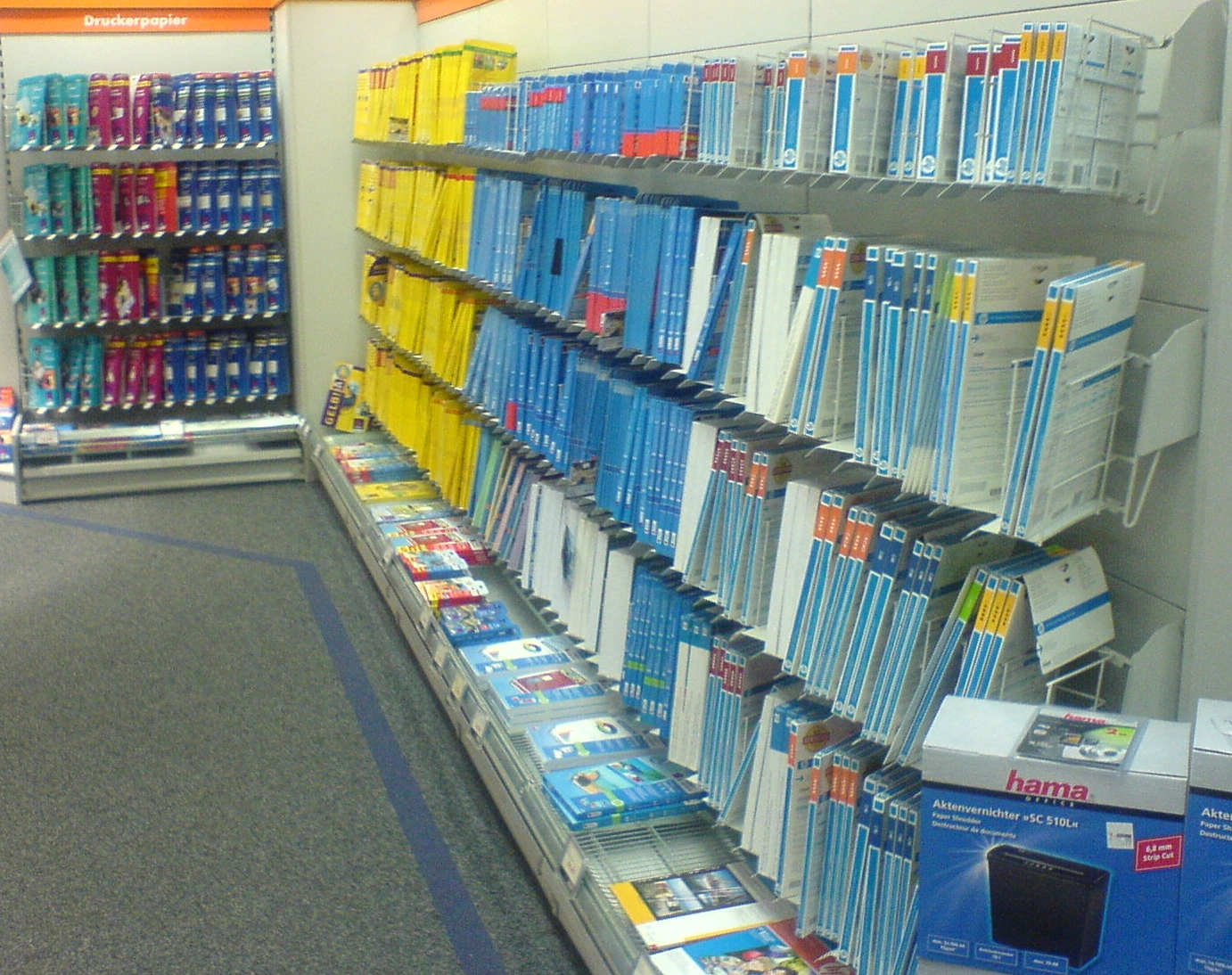
Paper for inkjet and laser printers in a store

Inkjet paper is a special fine paper designed for inkjet printers, typically classified by its weight, brightness and smoothness, and sometimes by its opacity.

== Manufacture ==
Some inkjet papers are made from high-quality deinked pulp or chemical pulps. Quality inkjet paper requires good dimensional stability, no curling or cockling, and good surface strength. For most purposes surface smoothness is required. Sufficient and even porosity is required to counteract spreading of the ink. For lower quality printing, uncoated copy paper suffices, but higher grades require coating. The traditional coatings are not widely used for inkjet papers. For matte inkjet papers, it is common to use silica as pigment together with polyvinyl alcohol (PVOH). Glossy inkjet papers can be made by multicoating, resin coating, or cast coating on a lamination paper.

A variety of fine art inkjet papers meet the needs of professional photographers and artists. These papers share many characteristics with traditional watercolor, printmaking, and photographic papers. Fine art inkjet papers are designed to meet similar standards for longevity as traditional fine art papers: they should have a neutral pH, be lignin-free, and not include optical brighteners. Fine art inkjet papers differ from traditional fine art papers, in that they include coatings engineered to receive and hold ink. Fine art papers are usually made of rag pulp (100% cotton being the most common) but may also have an alpha-cellulose base. Some fine art papers are mold made, while others are machine made, and may vary considerably in surface texture. Many fine art papers are available in pre-cut sheets or in rolls.

== Comparison to standard office paper ==
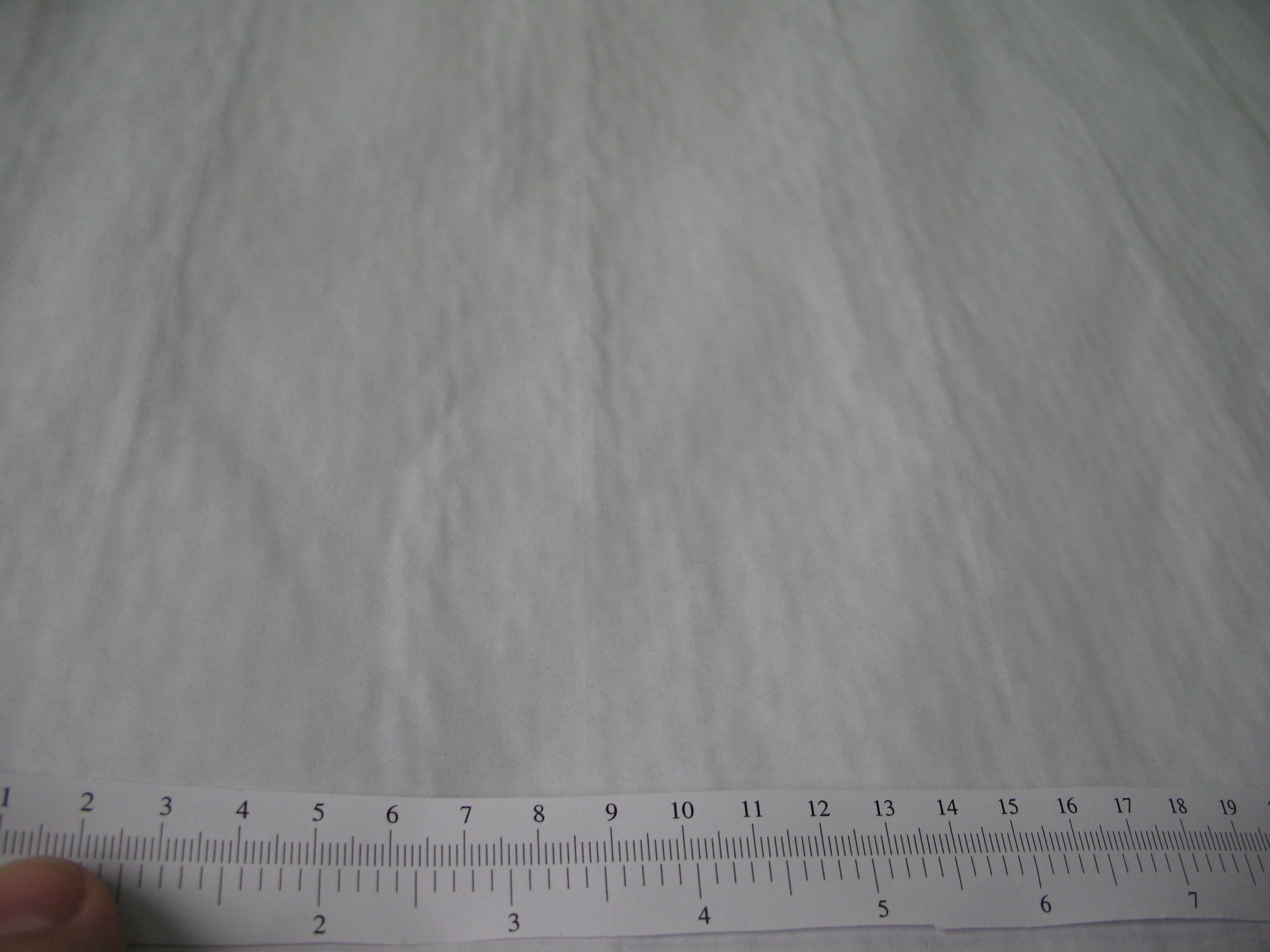
Example cheap uncoated paper heavily soaked with ink, showing the back of the paper. The moisture-soaked fibers swell and revert to their original shape, showing the mesh belt webbing used in the paper manufacturing plant.

Standard office paper has traditionally been designed for use with typewriters and copy machines, where the paper usually does not get wet. With these papers, moisture tends to wick through the fibers and away from the point of contact. For inkjet printing, this dulls edges of lines and graphic boundaries, and lessens pigment intensity.

High-quality inkjet printing with dark, crisp lines requires that the paper have exactly the right absorbency to accept the ink but prevent sideways spread. Many general-purpose office papers of weights around 21 to 27 lb (80–100 g/m^{2}) have been reformulated to work equally well with both inkjet and laser printers. However, this category of paper is only suitable for printing text, because the ink load is light.

Paper is manufactured by forming pulp fibers into a mat on an open mesh screen and then drying and pressing this mat into paper. Large areas of inkjet color, such as in graphics and photographs, soak the paper fibers with so much moisture that they swell and return to their original shape before pressing, resulting in a wavy buckling of the paper surface.

Double-sided inkjet printing is usually not possible with inexpensive low-weight copy paper because of bleed-through from one side to the other. These papers are also unsuitable for photographic work because standard office paper is usually not "white" enough. This results in a poor color gamut and leads to "muddy" colors. For all types of paper, printer driver settings must be adjusted to suit the paper, so that the printer delivers the right amount of ink.

== Inkjet photo paper ==
Photo paper is inkjet paper specifically for printing photographs. It is a bright white due to bleaching or pigments such as titanium dioxide, and has been coated with a highly absorbent material that limits diffusion of the ink. Highly refined clay is a common coating to prevent ink spread.

The best of these papers, with suitable pigment-based ink systems, can match or exceed the image quality and longevity of photographic gelatin-based silver halide continuous tone printing methods used for color photographs, such as Fuji CrystalArchive (for color prints from negatives) and Cibachrome/Ilfochrome (for color prints from positive transparencies). For printing monochrome photographs, some photographers believe that traditional silver-based papers exhibit deeper black tones and smoother tonal gradation compared with inkjet prints; however, objective testing of contemporary fine art inkjet media (in particular the finer gloss and luster papers) does not support these impressions. Paper is one amongst several key elements determining the quality of the print; the others are the ink, the printer, the printer/paper profile, the software used for print preparation and the skill and expertise of the print-maker.

Photo paper is typically divided into glossy, "matte", semi-matte, semi-gloss, satin or silk, and matte finishes. Paper thickness varies widely. Lighter weights are not much different from the general-purpose office papers described above, and can be used for all types of printing, though these are the least expensive and lowest-quality photo papers.

Photo papers for more critical work are thicker and have advanced coatings, sometimes with quick-drying properties. They can normally be printed only on the one specially coated side. A few papers are coated for double-sided printing.

Glossy photo paper has a shiny finish that gives photos a vivid look. It is generally smooth to the touch and has some glare depending on the lighting and the angle at which it is viewed. Matte photo paper is less shiny. Matte and glossy prints typically feel different to the touch, and they have different photographic properties. Black density and gamut of matte papers is normally less than for gloss or luster papers because of less reflectance and greater absorption/spread of ink into the paper. Papers with an imitation canvas texture emulate the look of oil paintings. Photo papers are usually high-brightness, fairly neutral white papers, but quite a few off-white papers are available.

As in offset litho printing and traditional photographic printing, glossy papers give the highest color density (or D_{max}), and therefore the widest color gamut. Photo papers vary in their longevity and their color gamut. Paper suppliers and printer manufacturers often provide color profiles for use with specific inks and printer models. Longevity of inkjet papers is defined according to the stability of certain parameters (for example, fading from exposure to light, change in color balance, ozone resistance, humidity resistance) and depends on the specific combination of inks and paper. For maximum longevity, the paper substrate should be lignin free or cotton-based, or a combination of the two, pH neutral and contain no optical brightening agents in either the substrate or the coatings. Plastic substrates also exist.

No official paper industry standard defines glossy, semi-matte, etcetera, though an objective scale is available for the glossiness of papers used in offset litho printing. Hewlett-Packard, Epson and Kodak all use their own terms to describe their paper, such as Everyday (HP), Premium High Gloss and Luster (Epson) and Ultima (Kodak). ECI (www.eci.org) has categorized papers for proofing simulation of litho papers (type1/2 etc.)

Types of Paper
Glossy

Glossy paper has a shiny surface. Light that falls on it reflects at a complementary angle. Users must handle glossy paper carefully to avoid finger spots.

Luster

Luster papers are shiny, but less so than glossy papers.

Metallic

Metallic paper has a sheet of BoPET between the printing paper and the emulsion.

== See also ==
- Bond paper
- Tracing paper
