= Acidic paper =

Phenomenon with acid in paper pulp

Acidic paper is paper which was manufactured using acidic substances. Widely used since the mid-nineteenth century, its pages become yellow within years, extremely brittle over decades, and eventually unreadable in the library and archive collections intended to preserve them. This process has been called slow fire.

== Causes of paper degradation ==
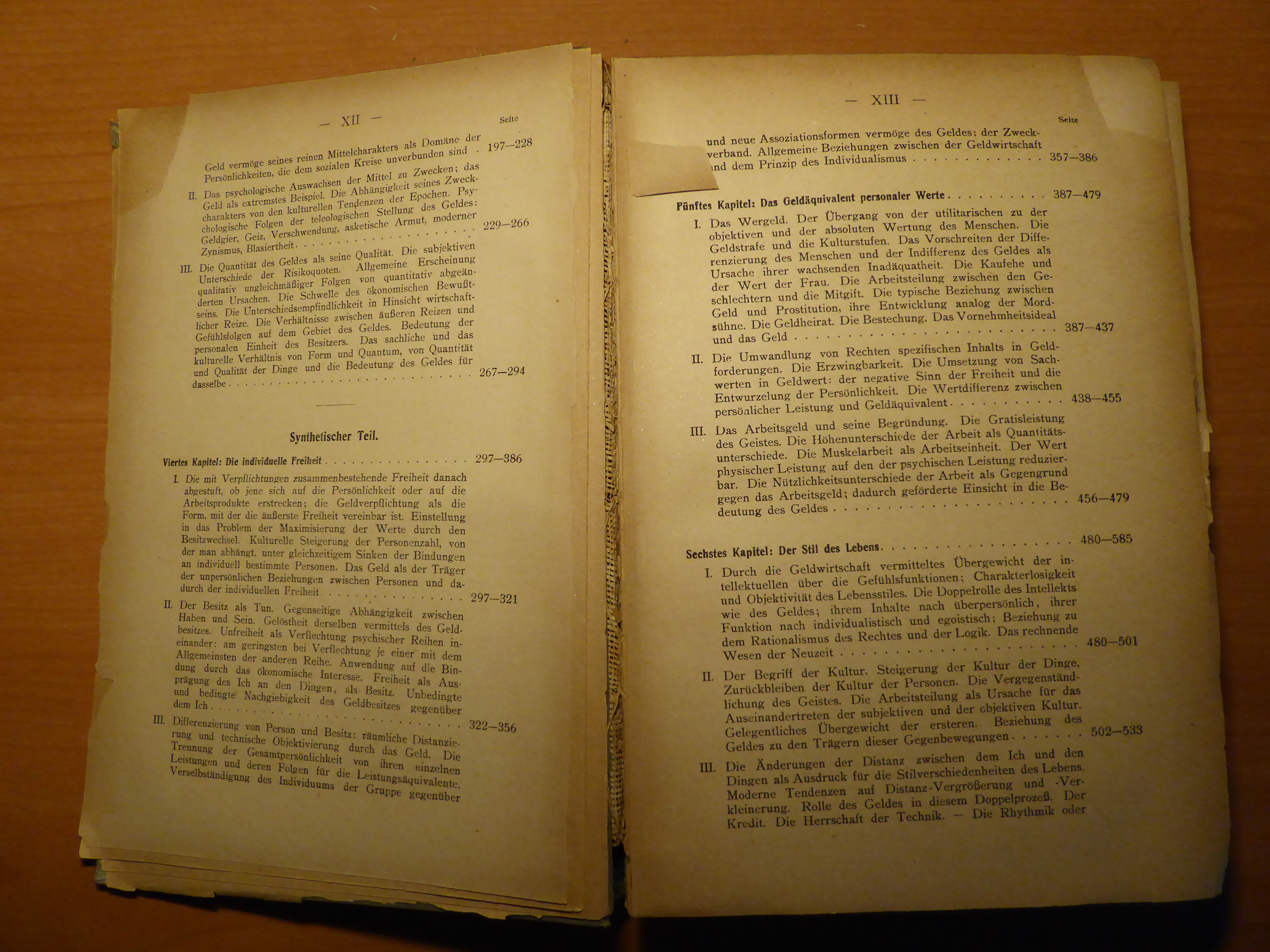
A book printed in 1920 on acidic paper, having visibly disintegrated

In the mid-nineteenth century, a method of paper production became popular in which resin-alum glue was added to the paper pulp, and the aluminum sulfate remaining in the paper, in reaction with water, forms acids. The long chains of plant cellulose, the structural material of paper, naturally decompose upon exposure to air, but this process is greatly accelerated by acids, which catalyze the decomposition (acidic hydrolysis). As the cellulose chains are cut apart, this reduces the tear resistance of the paper, and at the same time increases their cross-linking, making the paper stiff and brittle. Parallel to the degradation under the influence of water, the cellulose chains react with oxygen, also cutting the chains. The lignin in the paper is also oxidized, which yellows the paper.

The gradual and eventually complete deterioration of the paper as the cellulose chains disintegrate is known as slow fire. Paper acidification may be accelerated by environmental factors, especially nitrogen and sulfur oxides in polluted air.

== Consequences for archiving ==
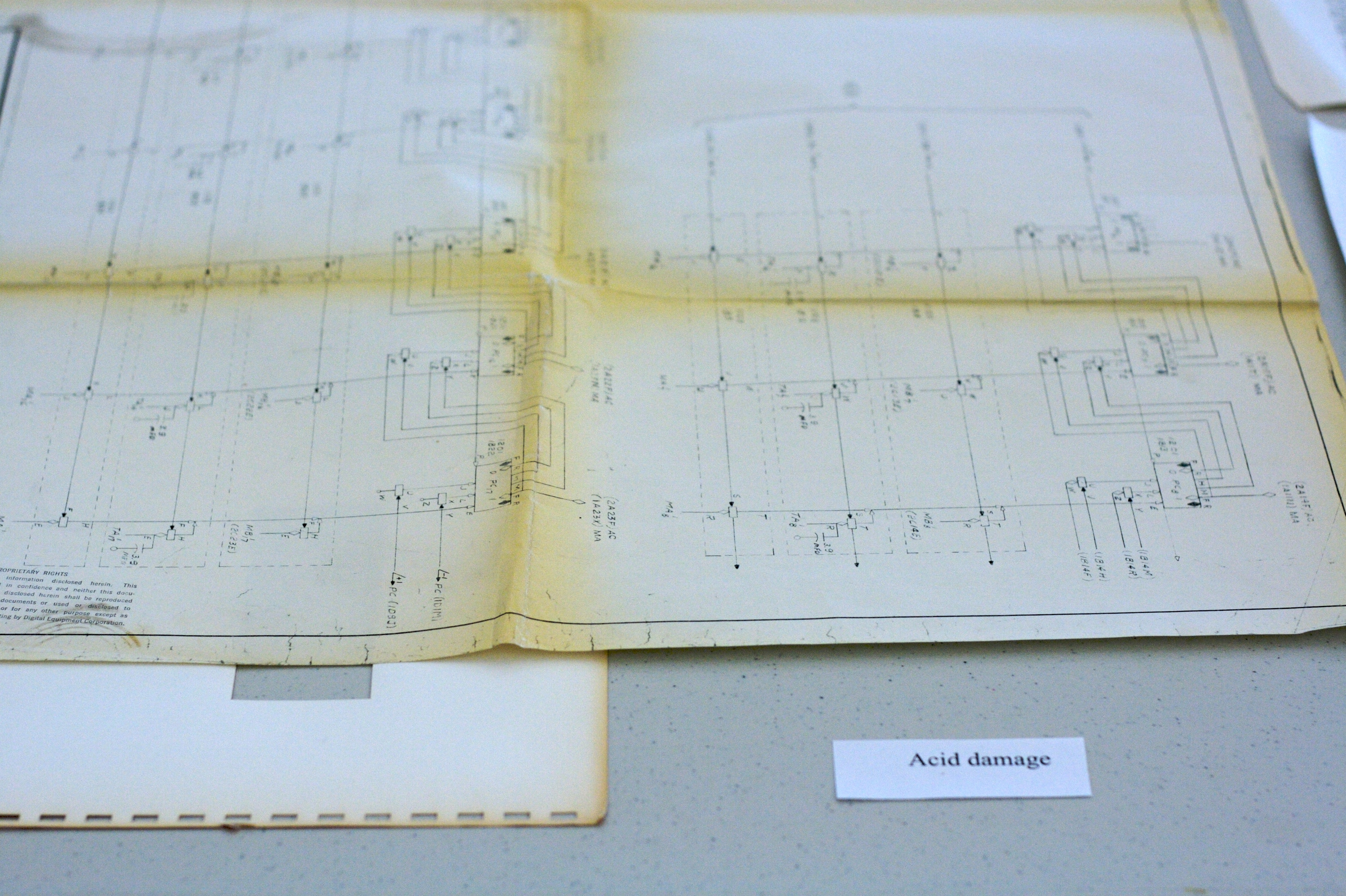
Document showing brown stain damage after long-term storage in an acidic cardboard box

The process of self-degradation of paper causes fundamental difficulties in safeguarding the collections of archives and libraries. For example, an analysis of the book collections of the Jagiellonian Library, Adam Mickiewicz University in Poznań, Książnica Cieszyńska, the AGH University of Science and Technology and the Cracow University of Technology showed that as much as 90% of the documents published up to 1996 are in the process of acidic degradation. This means that these institutions, established to care for the documented heritage of the past, are failing this mission.

Although the degradation of paper cannot be undone, only slowed, mass deacidification offers hope for conservation. Unfortunately, due to the difficulty of applying this technique and the rapid pace of paper degradation, it is not possible to save all the documents from the 19th and 20th centuries, and it seems necessary to select the most valuable among the endangered documents. Digitization and microfilming are other methods of rescue. Meanwhile, careful sharing and storage practices can prolong the paper's life, such as the use of acid-free storage materials and limiting exposure to light, especially in the UV range.

== Paper de-acidification in Poland ==
A large-scale de-acidification project was carried out in Poland, the Acidic Paper Multiannual Government Program of 2000–2008. In 1998, it was proposed jointly by librarians from Jagiellonian Library and chemists from the Faculty of Chemistry of Jagiellonian University, "to save the heritage of Polish culture in the library and archives of the 19th and 20th centuries".

The American Bookkeeper technology was chosen, using a deacidifying agent of fine crystalline magnesium oxide suspended in an organic liquid perfluoroheptane, neutral to inks, paints and dyes. The technology allows for recycling of the perfluoroheptane. Books are immersed in a de-acidifying bath, allowing the magnesium oxide to penetrate. The bath is vertical for typical-sized books and horizontal for large or heavy items such as magazines or archives. The Paper Clinic of the Jagiellonian Library in Krakow opened in 2005, and can de-acidify 35 tons of library materials annually. A second facility has been operating at the National Library since 2007, with a capacity of 50 tons.

== Acid-free paper ==
In recent years, most books have been printed on acid-free paper, meeting ISO standard 9706. The use of long-life paper has many benefits, especially for valuable cultural documents. It ensures that the work is preserved and available for generations.
