= Newspaper digitization =

Process of converting newspapers from analog form into digital images

Newspaper digitization is the process of converting old newspapers from analog form into digital images. The most common analog forms for old newspapers are paper and microfilm. Digitized images of newspaper pages are typically (though not always) analyzed with OCR software in order to produce text files of the newspaper content. Newspaper digitization is a special case of digitization in general.

Newspapers preserve a rich record of the past, and since the advent of digital media, many institutions across the world have begun to digitize them and make the digital files publicly available. However, over 90% of newspapers remained unscanned in 2015. Digitized newspapers may be made available for free or for a fee. Several lists (noted below) try to catalog digitized newspapers worldwide.

Successful newspaper scanning is a complex activity. Although scanning from paper is possible, microfilm scanning is cheaper and good microfilm has been called “the single most critical factor in the success of newspaper digitization.” The OCR analysis of scanned pages presents a number of technical challenges and the text of old newspapers is often difficult to read, which introduces errors and complicates searching. Attaching metadata to images to make them more easily findable is another important step. Finally, search interfaces must be developed. A number of companies specialize in newspaper scanning and some produce software specially designed for the process.

The cost of storing printed newspapers and the relatively low demand for originals after microfilming and scanning means that printed newspapers, once microfilmed or scanned, have often been thrown out. Some people feel that this is a loss for researchers, or simply that there is a poignancy when the paper reading experience disappears. Author Nicholson Baker went so far as to create a paper newspaper archive, which he called the American Newspaper Repository, in order to preserve paper newspapers that would otherwise be discarded.

More recent newspapers may have been "born digital," meaning that they were printed from computer files rather than by letterpress or phototypesetting. They can be archived by storing the publisher's digital files of each page image rather than scanning the pages.

== Finding aids and metasearch engines ==
- Worldwide list of online newspaper archives, maintained at Wikipedia.
- Worldwide list of newspaper digitization projects at the Center for Research Libraries, International Coalition on Newspapers.
- Elephind, a website that provides a free metasearch service for several large collections (mostly Australian and American).

== See also ==
- Digital reformatting
