= House of Holes =

2011 novel by Nicholson Baker

First edition (publ. Simon & Schuster)

House of Holes (originally published as House of Holes: A Book of Raunch) is a 2011 novel by American writer Nicholson Baker. It consists of a series of chapters that are more or less connected (some more, some less) which tell of the sexual and emotional experiences of a variety of characters in a kind of sexual fantasy land, the titular "House of Holes". The third "dirty novel" by Baker after Vox and The Fermata, it is praised by many reviewers for the inventiveness of its language.

== Reception ==
The novel met with critical praise on its release. For Andrew Palmer, writing in The Paris Review, House of Holes "legitimizes and exalts our most personal and private sources of delight." Baker's original use of language was lauded. In the New Yorker Ian Crouch attested "it’s packed with dirty words, some familiar, others wonderfully original."

House of Holes was the third in a string of pornographic novels by Baker, following Vox and The Fermata, and the acclaim for it was not universal. Writing in The Independent in 2011, Matt Thorne complained that "the purpose of this smutty gibberish isn't clear. Baker does seem to capture what a world based only on the fulfilment of frustrated desire might be like, but while Vox and The Fermata were playfully erotic, there is something heavy-handed about this strange third volume."
