= The Murder of Stephen King =

Mystery novel by James Patterson and Derek Nikitas

- Book cover
- Author: James Patterson; Derek Nikitas
- Language: English
- Genre: Thriller
- Publisher: Little, Brown and Company
- Pages: 140
- ISBN: 9780316317160

The Murder of Stephen King is an unreleased thriller novella by James Patterson and Derek Nikitas. The book features the character of real-life horror novelist Stephen King, who is pursued by a deranged stalker reenacting the violent events of King's novels.

Patterson canceled the book shortly after its announcement in September 2016, saying he did not want to create discomfort for King and his family due to King's history of being harassed by fans.

== Plot ==
A violent stalker reenacts horrific events from Stephen King's stories, with his ultimate target being King himself. The stalker intends to usurp King's status as a best-selling horror writer, with plans to "write a tell-all book from his prison cell and be crowned the new King of Horror."

King is the hero of the story and is not actually murdered. A detective named Jamie Peterson helps save King from the stalker.

== Background ==
Before the book's announcement, King and Patterson did not know each other in real life, although they had previously exchanged remarks on each other's work. In 2007, King said of Patterson: "I don't like him. I don't respect his books, because every one is the same." Patterson later replied that King's critique "doesn’t make too much sense. I’m a good dad, a nice husband. My only crime is I’ve sold millions of books."

In 2009, King again criticized Patterson, calling him "a terrible writer" but "very successful." In response, Patterson told the Associated Press that King's remarks were "hyperbole."

Patterson said in a 2012 interview with The Wall Street Journal that he was a regular reader of King's books, and that King had "taken shots at me for years. It's fine, but my approach is to do the opposite with him—to heap praise."

== Publication history ==
=== Writing process ===
Nikitas was contacted by Bill Robinson, co-president of James Patterson Entertainment, in September 2015. Robinson told Nikitas that Patterson was looking for coauthors for a new "BookShots" series of short reads under 150 pages. After sending Nikitas the outline of The Murder of Stephen King, Robinson asked him to draft a few chapters using Patterson's "cinematic" writing style, with short chapters that end in a cliffhanger. Patterson was pleased with the results, and Nikitas submitted a complete draft three months later. According to Nikitas, the editing process involved writing roughly a quarter of the book at a time, after which Patterson would provide editorial comments over a phone call.

=== Announcement and cancellation ===
Patterson announced The Murder of Stephen King in September 2016, with an expected publication date of November. The book promised to feature "all of Stephen King’s greatest villains, rolled into one". The announcement included a disclaimer from Patterson: "I'm a Stephen King fan, but Stephen King did not participate in the making of this novel, nor is he affiliated with it in any way. I hope he likes it."

In an interview with the Associated Press, Patterson reflected on King's previous comments toward him, saying: "I know I'm not a terrible writer. That's a little over the top." Patterson said that the book was meant as an homage to King, with praise for King's previous work. King declined to comment on the book, but confirmed receiving an advance copy.

Less than two weeks after the book was revealed, Patterson announced its cancellation. Patterson said that after the book's announcement, he had been made aware that "fans of Stephen King have disrupted the King household in the past". He clarified that The Murder of Stephen King was "a positive portrayal of a fictional character, and, spoiler alert, the main character is not actually murdered. Nevertheless, I do not want to cause Stephen King or his family any discomfort." Nikitas said that he was "disappointed" by the book's cancellation but "wanted to honor King" and was "understanding of his concerns."

The Murder of Stephen King was replaced by Taking the Titanic, a thriller novel about thieves aboard the Titanic, in Patterson's release schedule. Nikitas and Patterson collaborated on two more BookShots novels, Diary of a Succubus and You've Been Warned—Again.

=== Later comments ===
In a 2021 interview with The Guardian, Patterson again reflected on his relationship with King, saying: "I like his books, most of them… I think he's unnecessarily harsh at times and no, I'm not a terrible writer, but my basic approach to life is: it's OK, it’s all right."

In his 2022 autobiography James Patterson by James Patterson: The Stories of My Life, Patterson said that the book had been intended as "a little good-natured ribbing" of King, calling it "a cool story with Stephen King as the damn hero." According to Patterson, when publisher Little, Brown and Company informed King of the manuscript, his representatives told them that King's wife Tabitha King had previously been threatened by an intruder during a home invasion. Patterson wrote: "I didn’t know that, and I got the point. But shouldn't that mean that maybe Stephen King should stop writing his own scary stories—if they were genuinely putting his family members in danger. I'm just saying…"

== Reception ==
After Patterson announced The Murder of Stephen King, the book drew comparisons to Nicholson Baker's 2004 novel Checkpoint, in which a character plans to assassinate President George W. Bush, as well as King's own novel Misery, in which a novelist is kidnapped by a deranged fan.

Following news of the book's cancellation, Jeet Heer said in The New Republic that "writing a novel imagining the attempted killing of an actual living person is inherently a dicey affair" and that the idea "strikes a little too close to home" for King, given his history of stalkers. Paste said that the book "seemed in odd taste considering the two aren’t exactly friends." The A.V. Club also responded negatively to the idea, writing that "this is an actual living human who might not welcome the real-world horrors that could easily accompany such a 'brilliant' concept."
