= Flint Public Library (Flint, Michigan) =

Library in Flint, Michigan, United States

Coordinates: 43°01′18″N 83°40′45″W

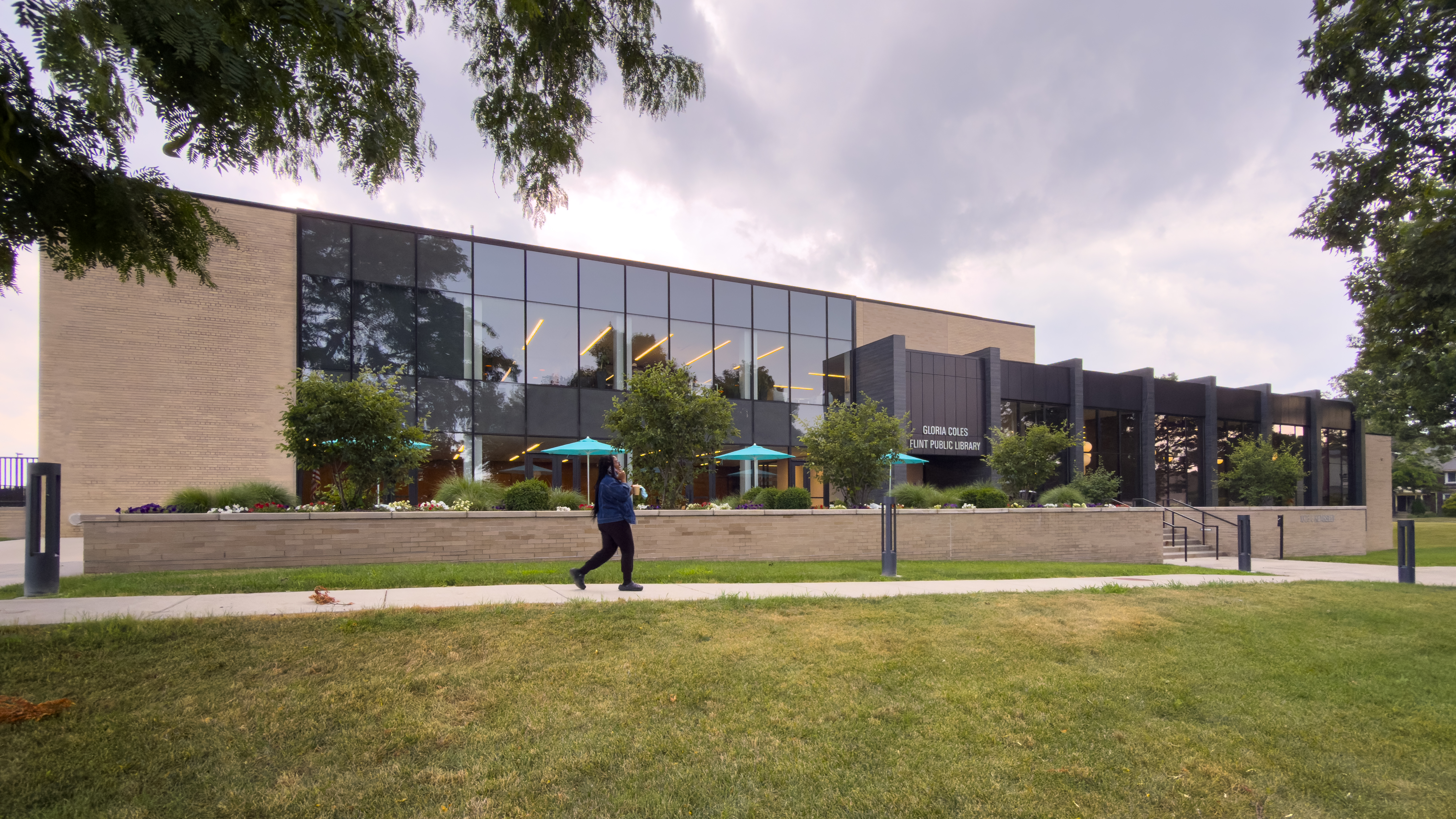
- Gloria Coles Flint Public Library (2026)
- Location: Flint Cultural Center, Flint, Michigan, United States
- Type: Public library
- Established: 1851

Other information
- Website: fpl.info

The Flint Public Library is the public library serving Flint, Michigan. It was founded in 1851, and its current building on the Flint Cultural Center campus was built in 1958. It has hosted the Michigan Storytellers Festival since 1981 and the Julia A. Moore Poetry Contest (to celebrate bad poetry) since 1994. During the Flint water crisis, the library played a key role supporting the community, and in the aftermath it partnered with StoryCorps to create oral history interviews of residents' experiences.

The Flint Public Library's collections document the City of Flint and Genesee County, local African-American history and literature, and genealogy. It also offers a Michigan Collection and an Automotive History Collection. The library has furthermore been designated a Federal Depository Library for government publications, maintains microfilm copies of The Flint Journal, and provides collections for both children and teenagers.

== History ==
The Flint Public Library was founded in 1851 by a group of women who were active in the local community. Initially a Flint Board of Education department, it evolved into a district library serving residents of Flint and its surrounding communities. In 1905, the library created a children's collection. In 1965, it participated in a trial (along with the Grand Rapids Public Library) of an electronic article surveillance system that was developed by the American Library Association, which reduced the losses due to thefts in the library from $15,000 to approximately $1,500.

In 1981, the Flint Public Library began holding the Michigan Storytellers Festival, which has been hosted both on site and at Crossroads Village in Genesee County. It has been attended by nationally prominent storytellers, including the Georgia Sea Island Singers, Bil Lepp, and Johnny Moses. In 1994, the library created the Julia A. Moore Poetry Contest to celebrate bad poetry, inspired by Julia A. Moore; she was known as "The Sweet Singer of Michigan" and considered "history's worst best-selling poet" by some poetry critics, according to William F. Ast III of The Herald-Palladium.

In 2015, the Flint Public Library partnered with the A Kut Above barbershop to create the Read-While-You-Wait Library, a collection of books for boys ages 4–10 to read while waiting for haircuts. In the aftermath of the Flint water crisis, the library partnered with StoryCorps to create oral history interviews of residents' experiences, starting in 2016; this built off a previous, pre-water crisis partnership and resulted in interview recordings being deposited at the Library of Congress. Additionally, Julie Hordyk argued that the library played a key role supporting the community in three ways during the water crisis: firstly, its staff engaged directly in determining what course of action to take and how to handle resources; secondly, it served as a trusted and accessible gateway to critical information for community members; and thirdly, it linked donors from outside the city with the community's local response system.

In February 2020, the library closed to allow for major renovations, and in July 2020 it opened a temporary location at Courtland Center in Burton.

== Collections ==
The Flint Public Library preserves and provides access to collections documenting the City of Flint and Genesee County, including local African-American history and literature. Its Michigan Collection is one of the largest of its kind in the state, and it also has an Automotive History Collection. The library boasts Michigan's second-largest open-stack genealogical collection, which benefits from donations of family history-related materials from the Flint Genealogical Society, an organization that also maintains volunteers at the library to provide free assistance to those conducting genealogical research. Furthermore, the library has been designated a Federal Depository Library for government publications.

In addition to a Children's Section that includes 50,000 volumes of both fiction and nonfiction, the Flint Public Library offers a Young Adult section known as "The Teen Zone" that provides information resources as well as literature for teenagers. Additionally, the library maintains microfilm copies of The Flint Journal. It is also home to a branch of the Michigan Legal Help Self-Help Center Network of Genesee County, which provides on-site "navigators" to answer questions from the public (although they do not give legal advice) in addition to resources available online through the library's computers.

== Building ==
The Flint Public Library's Main Library is located on the western end of the Flint Cultural Center campus. The building was designed by Sulho Alexander Nurmi, Louis C. Kingscott & Associates and built in 1958. The library board partnered with OPN Architects to create a proposed $24-million renovation to the building, with the primary goals of maximizing the amount of the building's 94,000 square feet (8,700 m^{2}) of space that is used publicly, keeping parts of the library open after regular hours, expanding the children's and teen areas, and creating a quiet zone. During the summer months, the library hosts arts, blues, and storytelling festivals outdoors on its lawns.
