= The Way the World Works =

2012 nonfiction anthology by Nicholson Baker

- First edition (US)
- Author: Nicholson Baker
- Language: English
- Genre: Non-fiction, essays
- Publisher: Simon & Schuster
- Publication date: 2012
- Publication place: United States
- Pages: 317
- ISBN: 978-1-47110-267-7

The Way the World Works is a 2012 book by Nicholson Baker that collects thirty-four previously published essays together. These essays were originally published in a variety of publications, including The New York Times, The New York Review of Books, and The New Yorker.

== Synopsis ==
Baker's subjects range widely, from subjective accounts of his own childhood and early life, to a feature on The New Yorker’s editor David Remnick, and an essay on the editorial process of Wikipedia. Baker also includes a number of essays on newspapers and libraries, advocating the importance of conservation of material, such as runs of newspapers, and arguing against digitisation at the expense of physical copies of texts. The book is divided into five sections: Life, Reading, Libraries and Newspapers, Technology, War, and one final essay, Last Essay (which is about mowing the lawn and learning about the world). Life deals with biographical anecdotes, some of which are very short essays. Reading examines the act of reading and the importance of interacting with books, including an essay on the compilation of common-place books and an examination of Daniel Defoe and journalistic veracity. Libraries and Newspapers includes an address given at the opening of a new library building at Duke; Baker also describes his own efforts to preserve library catalogues and newspaper runs. Technology includes what is effectively a review of Amazon's Kindle 2 and also describes’ Baker's interest in the editorial process of Wikipedia in a separate essay, "The Charms of Wikipedia". War's biggest essay comprises a riposte to reviews of Human Smoke, Baker’s 2008 book on World War II, in which he argues that the case for pacifism is often misunderstood and examines the reputation and effects of various campaigners for pacifism.

== Reception ==
Professional reviews of The Way the World Works were generally positive, with some including criticism for the work. Laurence Phelan of The Independent describes Baker's prose as having "a specificity, elegance and personality that even Simpsons writers cannot match." Leo Robson in The Guardian describes it as “ephemera” and said that “Baker takes small subjects but he leaves them small, failing to summon in his work as a journalist the transformative energies on display in his novels”, though Robson also states that while most of the essays fail to deliver, “the exceptions are few but thrilling.” David Ulin writes in The LA Times that the collection is "a little scattershot...some of the pieces here feel repetitious, negligible" and also criticises Baker for a "gratuitous, even fawning" profile of David Remnick. Nicholas Blincoe in The Telegraph praises the “warm, technical and attractively lucid” style and states that Baker “is one of the most important writers we have”; he does, however, also criticise Baker, with reference to his arguments for pacifism, because “his devotion to making things work leads him astray.” Publishers Weekly describes the collection as “a delight to read...[offering] gorgeous prose and [posing] important questions about our era of digital readership.”
