= U and I: A True Story =

1991 non-fiction book by Nicholson Baker

- First edition
- Author: Nicholson Baker
- Language: English
- Genre: Biography
- Publisher: Random House
- Publication date: 1991
- Publication place: United States
- Media type: Print
- Pages: 179 pp
- ISBN: 0394589947
- OCLC: 22862177
- Dewey Decimal: 813/.54, B
- LC Class: PS3552.A4325 Z477 1991
- Preceded by: Room Temperature

U and I: A True Story is a non-fiction book by Nicholson Baker that was published in 1991. The book is a study of how a reader engages with an author's work: partly an appreciation of John Updike, and partly a kind of self-exploration. Rather than giving a traditional literary analysis, Baker begins the book by stating that he will read no more Updike than he already has up to that point. All of the Updike quotations used are presented as coming from memory alone, and many are inaccurate, with correct versions and Baker's (later) commentary on the inaccuracy given in brackets.

== Critical reception ==
The book received generally positive reviews. Publishers Weekly said: "the book presents a telling portrait of a working writer and critic. This is not a primitive, adulatory dialogue with the oeuvre of a lofty father figure; rather, it is a quivering 'imaginary friendship' with living literary kin." The New York Times called U and I a "highly original and intelligent meditation," concluding, "Nicholson Baker has exquisitely rendered a rich and sensitive portrait of one writer's search for artistic integrity."
