= Googled: The End of the World as We Know It =

Book by Ken Auletta

- Book cover
- Author: Ken Auletta
- Language: English
- Subject: Google, Internet industry, web search engines, history
- Published: 2009
- Publication place: United States
- Pages: 432
- ISBN: 978-0-7535-2243-1

Googled: The End of the World as We Know It is a book published in 2009 by American writer, journalist and media critic Ken Auletta. It examines the evolution of Google as a company, its philosophy, business ethics, future plans and impact on society, the world of business and the Internet.

== Synopsis ==
For his book, Auletta interviewed one hundred and fifty people related to Google and an equal number of persons unrelated to the company, including top media company executives.

Auletta uses Edgar Allan Poe's short story The Purloined Letter to describe the attitude of the executives of the traditional media companies toward Google, and illustrate the belated recognition of Google's power by mainstream media.

He suggests that in a similar fashion to the prefect in Poe's story who could not locate the letter although it was in plain sight, it took the media company executives until 2004, when Google issued its initial public offering, to first realise the magnitude of Google's digital power.

Auletta uses the term "frenemies" to describe the attitude of the traditional media companies as well as Microsoft toward Google, as they try to cooperate with the company despite their adversarial and mistrustful relationship.

== Reception and analysis ==
Nicholson Baker in his book review for the New York Times writes that he obtained a lot of information from Auletta's book regarding Google's adversarial relationship with various companies such as Facebook and Viacom. Google's involvement in the Yahoo-Microsoft case is also explored as well as the gradually deteriorating relationship between Google and Apple. Baker also finds that one of the strengths of Auletta's book are his interviews with a large number of media company executives, during which they express their criticism of Google. The review mentions Auletta's use of military terminology when he refers to privacy concerns about Google which he compares to a predator drone which could potentially destroy the company.

The Globe and Mail's book review mentions that although Auletta was granted access to Google's executives, his book does not reveal many unexpected details. The review also mentions that Auletta explains adequately how Google's black box algorithms work and that the author describes clearly the impact Google's innovations have had on the media industry, especially in the advertising sector.

The Christian Science Monitor writes that Auletta throughout his book breaks from the historical narrative documenting Google's success story to contextualise it and juxtapose it to a business environment where traditional media companies face a crisis due to their difficulty in adopting innovation. Despite that, Auletta is not completely negative about the future of the traditional media and allows that there is still demand for journalism and information; although the method of distributing the content to the consumers in a profitable way is not yet clear.

The Los Angeles Times reviewer remarks that whereas "Google" has become a common word in the English language synonymous to online searching, the term "Googled", as used in Auletta's book title, is more synonymous to "outsmarted", "slamdunked", and "left for dead", when applied to traditional media companies.

The review in The Observer calls the book "superbly balanced" but it remarks that despite its balance, Auletta's work does not show Google has a real understanding of the media whose operations it is disrupting. The review cites the example of a conversation between Auletta and Sergei Brin. After Brin suggested that "people don't buy books" and "you might as well put it online", Auletta asked Brin how does he propose book authors get funding for expenses incurred while writing their books without getting an advance from a publisher. According to the review, Brin did not reply to the question.

The book critique on Business Insider comments on the contrast which exists between Google's advocacy of free access to information and intellectual property and their own policies related to disclosure of their business practices and data processing algorithms.
