= Ken Auletta =

American writer, journalist, and media critic

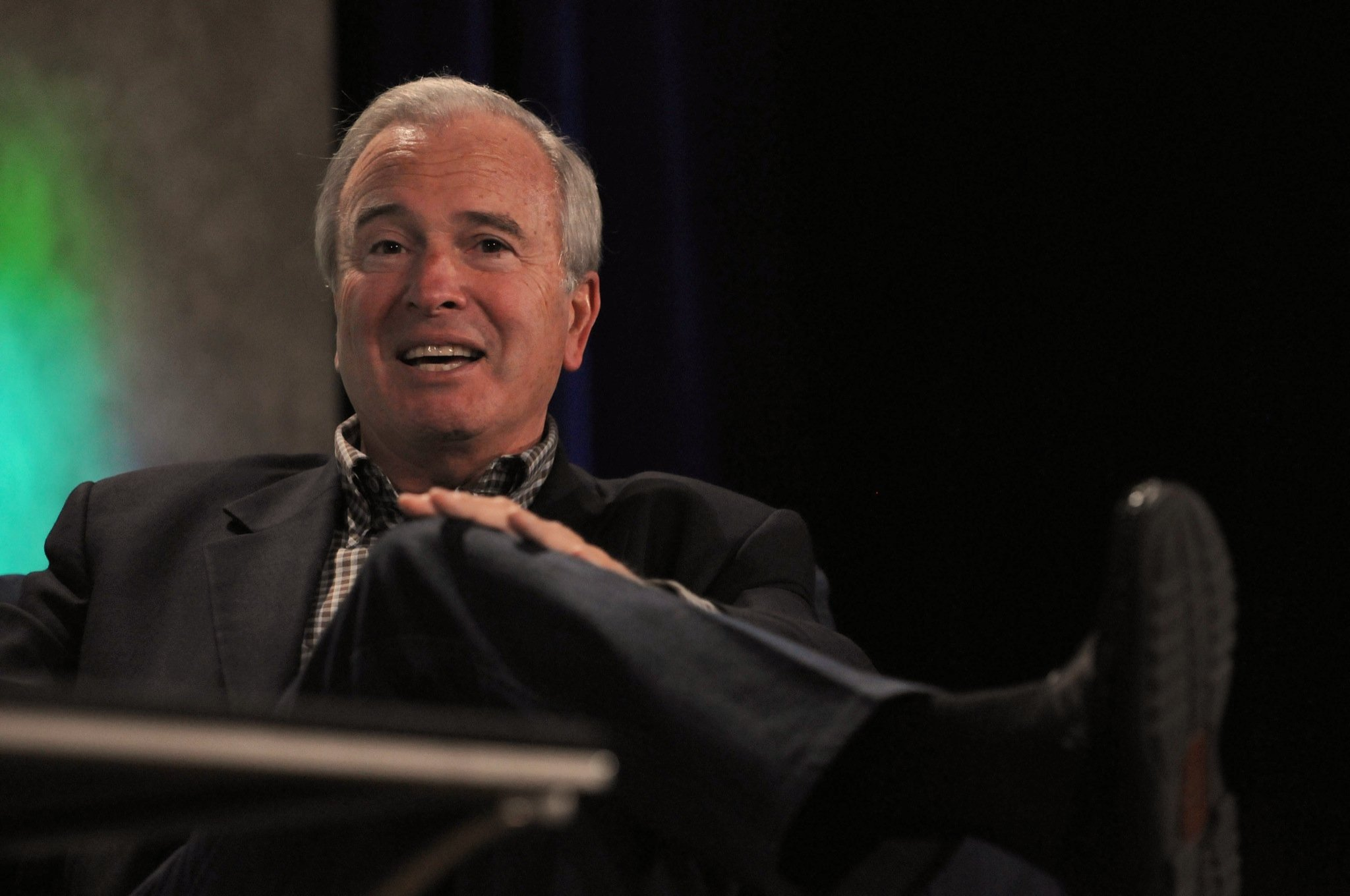
- Born: April 23, 1942 (age 84); New York City, New York, U.S.
- Education: State University of New York, Oswego (BA); Syracuse University (MA)
- Spouse: Amanda Urban

Kenneth B. Auletta (born April 23, 1942) is an American author, a political columnist for the New York Daily News, and media critic for The New Yorker.

== Early life and education ==
The son of an Italian-American father and a Jewish-American mother, Auletta grew up in the Coney Island section of Brooklyn, New York. His father Pat was a sporting goods store owner and founder of the Coney Island Sports League who was responsible for discovering Sandy Koufax, a young baseball pitcher playing in the league who went on to have a Hall of Fame career with the Brooklyn/Los Angeles Dodgers after Pat urged the team to take a "look at this kid Koufax."

Auletta attended Abraham Lincoln High School in Coney Island. He graduated from the State University of New York at Oswego and received his M.A. in political science from the Maxwell School of Citizenship and Public Affairs at Syracuse University.

== Writing career ==
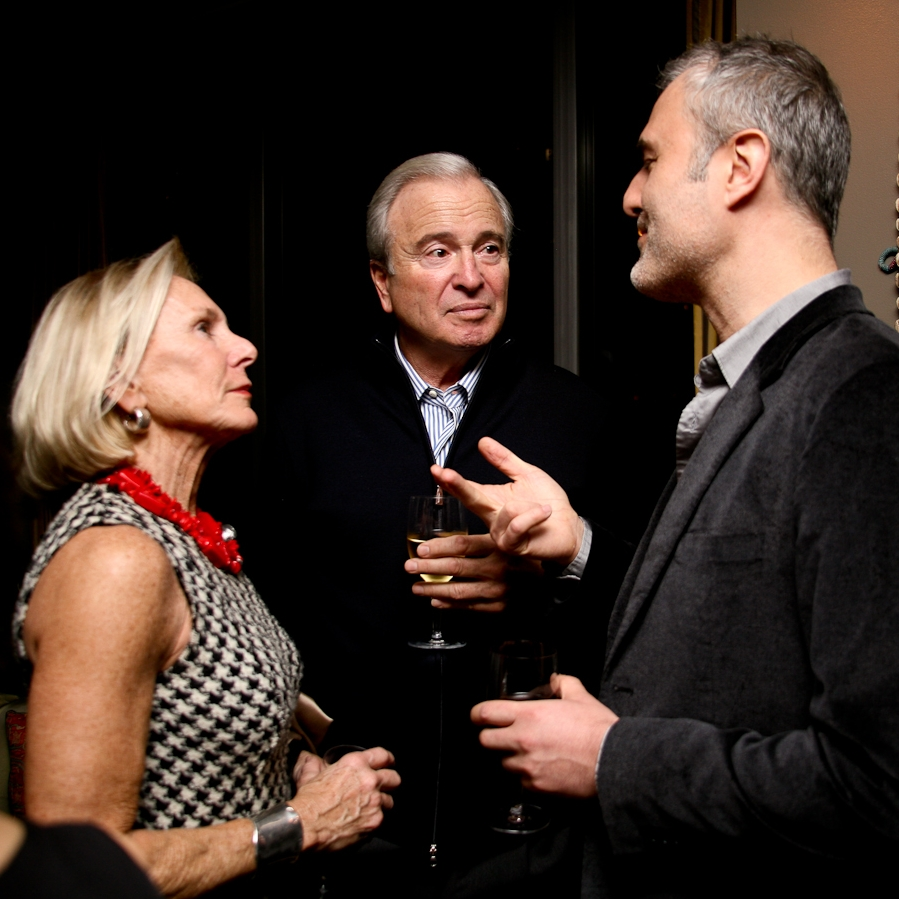
Amanda Urban, Ken Auletta, and Nick Denton

While in graduate school, Auletta taught and trained Peace Corps volunteers. He "got bored in a Ph.D political science program and left to be a gofer and write speeches in politics; then on to serve in government", then working for then-Senator Robert F. Kennedy's 1968 presidential campaign before serving as campaign manager for former Administrator of the Small Business Administration Howard J. Samuels's failed 1974 gubernatorial campaign. From 1971 to 1974, he also served as the first executive director of the now-defunct New York City Off-Track Betting Corporation under the aegis of Samuels (who was concurrently appointed as the corporation's chairman).

After Samuels's defeat, Auletta became a daily reporter for the New York Post in 1974. Following that, he was a writer for The Village Voice, and a politics writer at New York. He began contributing to The New Yorker in 1977, writing a two-part article on New York City Mayor Ed Koch in 1978. He also wrote a weekly political column for the New York Daily News and was a political commentator on WCBS-TV. In 1986, he received the Gerald Loeb Award for Large Newspapers. He was the guest editor of the 2002 edition of The Best Business Stories of the Year.

Auletta started writing the "Annals of Communications" profiles for The New Yorker in 1992. His 2001 profile of Ted Turner, "The Lost Tycoon", won a National Magazine Award for Profile Writing. He is the author of twelve books, his first being The Streets Were Paved With Gold (1979). His other books include The Underclass (1983), Greed and Glory on Wall Street: The Fall of The House of Lehman (1986), Three Blind Mice: How the TV Networks Lost Their Way (1991), The Highwaymen: Warriors of the Information Superhighway (1997), and World War 3.0: Microsoft and Its Enemies (2001). His book Backstory: Inside the Business of News (2003) is a collection of his columns from The New Yorker. Five of his first 11 books were national bestsellers, including Googled: The End of the World as We Know It (2009).

In late 2014 he published a profile of Elizabeth Holmes and the company she founded, Theranos. While largely uncritical, the profile did note an absence of clinical tests and peer-reviewed studies supporting Theranos' alleged scientific innovations; it also characterized Holmes' explanation of the Theranos blood-testing process as "comically vague". Former Wall Street Journal reporter John Carreyrou has credited Auletta's profile for stimulating his initial interest in Theranos.

His twelfth book, Frenemies: The Epic Disruption of the Ad Business (And Everything Else), was published in 2018. It described how advertising and marketing, with worldwide spending of up to $2 trillion, and without the subsidies of which most media, including Google and Facebook, would eventually perish, being already a victim of disruption.

He published his thirteenth book, Hollywood Ending: Harvey Weinstein and the Culture of Silence, a biography of former entertainment mogul and convicted sex offender Harvey Weinstein, 2022.

Auletta popularized the idea of the so-called "information superhighway" with his February 22, 1993, New Yorker profile of Barry Diller, in which he described how Diller used his Apple PowerBook to anticipate the advent of the Internet and our digital future. He has profiled the leading figures and companies of the Information Age, including Bill Gates, Reed Hastings, Sheryl Sandberg, Rupert Murdoch, John Malone, and the New York Times.

Auletta has been named a Library Lion Honoree by the New York Public Library. He has won numerous journalism awards, and was selected as one of the twentieth century's top one hundred business journalists. He has served as a Pulitzer Prize juror, and for four decades has been a judge of the annual national Livingston Award for young journalists. He has twice served as a board member of International PEN, and was a longtime trustee and member of the executive committee of The Public Theater / New York Shakespeare Festival. Auletta is a member of the Council on Foreign Relations.

== Personal life ==
Before October 2021, Auletta had an apartment on Lenox Hill in Manhattan with his wife, Amanda "Binky" Urban, a literary agent. As of 2013, the couple also owned a house in Bridgehampton, New York. They have a daughter.

== Portrayals in popular culture ==
On 11 September 1995, Auletta was satirized as "Ken Fellata" in The New Republic by Jacob Weisberg and later New Yorker colleague Malcolm Gladwell.

Auletta is a commentator in Where's My Roy Cohn?

== Works ==
=== Books ===
External videos
- In Depth interview with Auletta, February 1, 2004, C-SPAN
- Booknotes interview with Auletta on Three Blind Mice, October 6, 1991, C-SPAN
- Washington Journal interview with Auletta on The Highwaymen, May 29, 1997, C-SPAN
- Presentation by Auletta on Media Man, November 4, 2004, C-SPAN
- Q&A interview with Auletta on Googled, October 29, 2009, C-SPAN
- Presentation by Auletta on Googled, November 11, 2009, C-SPAN
- Interview with Auletta on Googled, November 11, 2010, C-SPAN
- Presentation by Auletta on Frenemies, June 26, 2018, C-SPAN
- Presentation by Auletta on Hollywood Ending, July 14, 2022, C-SPAN

- The Streets were Paved with Gold. 1979.
- Hard Feelings: Reporting on Pols, the Press, People, and the City. 1980.
- The Underclass. New York: Random House. 1983. ISBN 9780394523439.
- Greed and Glory on Wall Street: The Fall of The House of Lehman. 1986. ISBN 9780394544106.
- Three Blind Mice: How the TV Networks Lost Their Way. New York: Random House. 1991. ISBN 9780394563589.
- The Highwaymen: Warriors of the Information Superhighway. 1997. ISBN 9780156005739.
- The Art of Corporate Success: The Story of Schlumberger. 2001.
- World War 3.0: Microsoft and Its Enemies. 2001. ISBN 9780375503665.
- Backstory: Inside the Business of News. 2003. ISBN 9781594200007.
- Media Man: Ted Turner's Improbable Empire. 2004.
- Googled: The End of the World As We Know It. 2009.
- Frenemies: The Epic Disruption of the Ad Business (and Everything Else). 2018.
- Hollywood Ending: Harvey Weinstein and the Culture of Silence. Penguin Press. 2022. ISBN 9781984878373.

=== Essays and reporting ===
- "Don't Mess With Roy Cohn". Esquire. December 1978.
- "The Pirate". Annals of Communication. The New Yorker. November 13, 1995. a Profile of Rupert Murdoch
- "The Lost Tycoon: Now he has no wife, no job, and no empire, but Ted Turner may just save the world". Annals of Communication. The New Yorker. April 23, 2001.
- "Beauty and the Beast: Harvey Weinstein has made some great movies, and a lot of enemies". Annals of Communication. The New Yorker. December 16, 2002.
- "The Howell Doctrine". Annals of Communication. The New Yorker. June 10, 2002. A profile of Howell Raines
- "Fortress Bush: How the White House keeps the press under control". Annals of Communication. The New Yorker. January 19, 2004.
- "Publish or perish : can the iPad topple the Kindle, and save the book business?". Annals of Communication. The New Yorker. 86 (10): 24–31. April 26, 2010.
- "The Networker: Afghanistan's first media mogul". Annals of Communication. The New Yorker. July 5, 2010. A profile of Saad Mohseni
- "Get Rich U.: There are no walls between Stanford and Silicon Valley. Should there be?". Annals of Communication. The New Yorker. April 30, 2012.
- "Citizens Jain: Why India's newspaper industry is thriving". Annals of Communication. The New Yorker. October 8, 2012.
- "Business outsider : can a disgraced Wall Street analyst earn trust as a journalist?". Annals of Communication. The New Yorker. 89 (8): 30–37. April 8, 2013. Henry Blodget
- "Outside the box : Netflix and the future of television". Annals of Communication. The New Yorker. 89 (47): 54–61. February 3, 2014.
- "The Hillary Show : can Hillary Clinton and the media learn to get along?". Annals of Communication. The New Yorker. 90 (15): 28–34. June 2, 2014.
- "Blood, simpler : one woman's drive to upend medical testing". Annals of Innovation. The New Yorker. 90 (40): 26–32. December 15, 2014.
  - Elizabeth Holmes, CEO of Theranos
