= Obituary poetry =

Art of creating poems that commemorate a person's or group of people's deaths

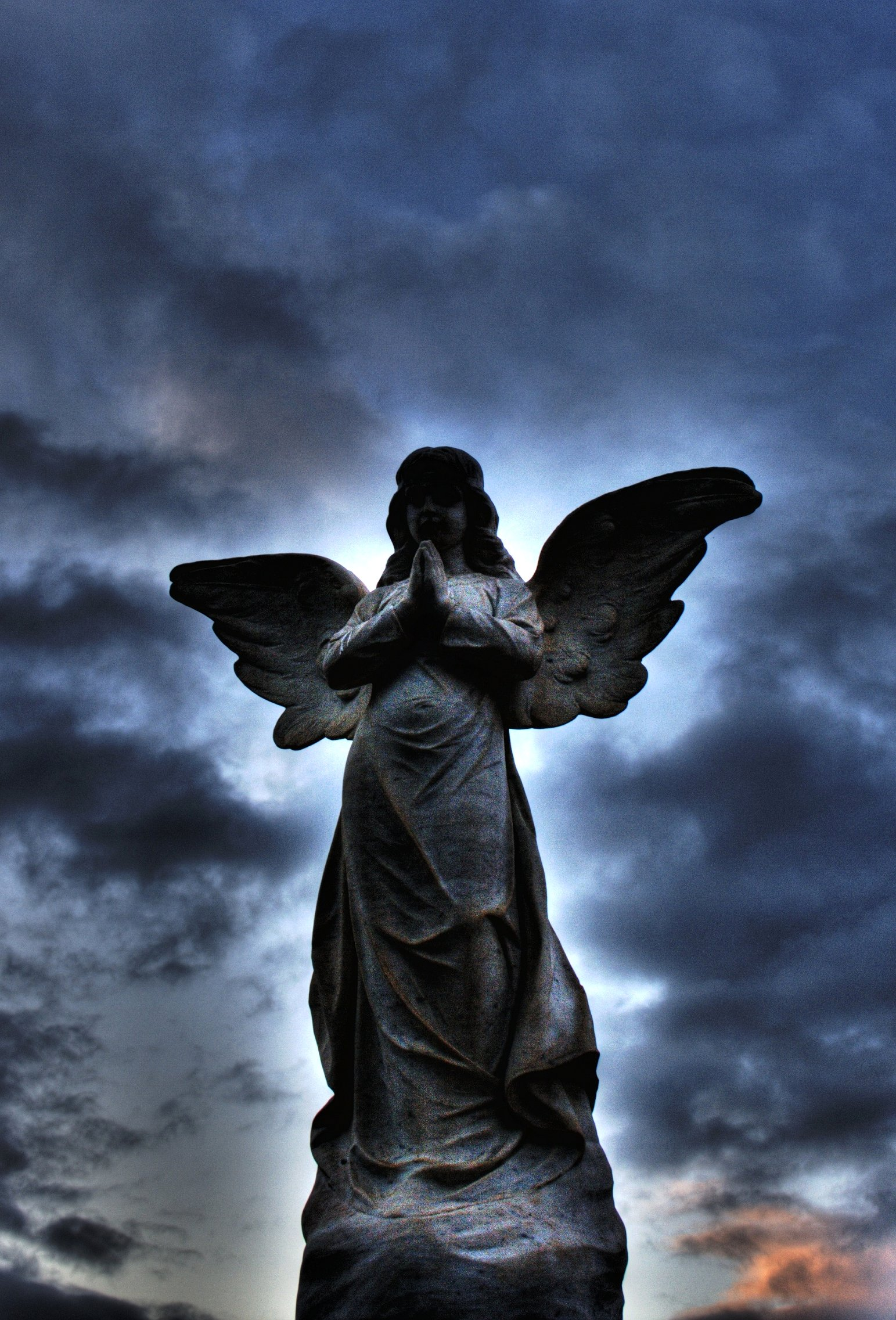
"Their little souls to the angels flew...."

Obituary poetry, in the broad sense, includes poems or elegies that commemorate a person's or group of people's deaths.

In its stricter sense, though, it refers to a genre of popular verse or folk poetry that had its greatest popularity in the nineteenth century, especially in the United States of America. The genre consists largely of sentimental narrative verse that tells the story of the demise of its typically named subjects and seeks to console their mourners with descriptions of their happy afterlife. The genre achieved its peak of popularity in the decade of the 1870s. While usually full chiefly of conventional pious sentiments, the obituary poets in one sense continue the program of meditations on death begun by the eighteenth-century graveyard poets, such as Edward Young's Night Thoughts, and as such continue one of the themes that went into literary Romanticism.

== Death poetry in the popular press ==
Obituary poetry constituted a large portion of the poetry published in American newspapers in the nineteenth century. In 1870, Mark Twain wrote an essay on "Post-mortem Poetry", in which he remarked that:

In Philadelphia they have a custom which it would be pleasant to see adopted throughout the land. It is that of appending to published death-notices a little verse or two of comforting poetry. Any one who is in the habit of reading the daily Philadelphia LEDGER must frequently be touched by these plaintive tributes to extinguished worth. In Philadelphia, the departure of a child is a circumstance which is not more surely followed by a burial than by the accustomed solacing poesy in the PUBLIC LEDGER. In that city death loses half its terror because the knowledge of its presence comes thus disguised in the sweet drapery of verse.

and collected examples, such as the following, occasioned by the death of Samuel Pervil Worthington Doble, aged 4 days.

Our little Sammy's gone,
His tiny spirit's fled;
Our little boy we loved so dear
Lies sleeping with the dead.

A tear within a father's eye,
A mother's aching heart,
Can only tell the agony
How hard it is to part.

== Obituary poets ==
The deaths of children and young adults were particular objects of inspiration to the obituary poets, who memorialized them with sentimental verse. Julia A. Moore, a poet from Michigan who published several volumes of poems mostly on obituary subjects, was a well known exponent of the genre. G. Washington Childs, sometimes called "The Laureate of Grief", was another well known exponent; he was one of the chief authors of the verse appearing in the Philadelphia Public Ledger that was noticed by Twain. Lydia Sigourney, while not confining her work to the genre, frequently contributed to it:

Ere sin has seared the breast,
Or sorrow waked the tear,
Rise to thy throne of changeless rest,
In yon celestial sphere!

== Parodies ==
Twain's character of "Emmeline Grangerford", appearing in The Adventures of Huckleberry Finn, was inspired by the genre, and in large measure by Moore's verse. Twain's was by no means the only parody the genre inspired. Max Adeler mocked the obituary poets in his 1874 Out of the Hurly Burly, and Eugene Field produced The Little Peach:

John took a bite and Sue a chew,
And then the trouble began to brew,—
Trouble the doctor could n't subdue.
— Too true!

Under the turf where the daisies grew
They planted John and his sister Sue,
And their little souls to the angels flew,—
— Boo hoo!

The obituary poets were, in the popular stereotype, either women or clergymen. Obituary poetry may be the source of some of the murder ballads and other traditional narrative verse of the United States, and the sentimental tales told by the obituary poets showed their abiding vitality a hundred years later in the genre of teenage tragedy songs.

== See also ==
- Death poem
- Dirge
- Elegy
