= Human Smoke =

2008 book by Nicholson Baker

Human Smoke: The Beginnings of World War II, the End of Civilization
- First edition
- Author: Nicholson Baker
- Language: English
- Genre: History, Pacifism
- Publisher: Simon & Schuster
- Publication date: 2008
- Publication place: United States
- Pages: 576

Human Smoke: The Beginnings of World War II, the End of Civilization is a 2008 book by Nicholson Baker about World War II. It questions the commonly held belief that the Allies wanted to avoid the war at all costs but were forced into action by Adolf Hitler's aggression. It consists largely of official government transcripts, newspaper articles, and other documents from the time, with Baker only occasionally interjecting commentary. Baker cites documents that suggest that the leaders of the United States and the United Kingdom were provoking Germany and Japan into war and had ulterior motives for participating. He dedicates the book to American and British pacifists of the time who, he states in the book's epilogue, were right all along: "They failed, but they were right."

== Reception ==
The book had many negative reviews. Historian Noel Malcolm described it as a "strangely childish book" and journalist William Grimes in The New York Times as a "self-important, hand-wringing, moral mess of a book." Christopher Hitchens accused Baker of ahistoricism and wrote that numerous passages in the book served as a reminder of how "fatuous the pacifist position can sound, or indeed can be." Louis Menand wrote that each of Baker's themes is a "legitimate matter of debate" but criticized the selective use of primary sources as a "tabloid technique" of emotional manipulation. Piers Brendon criticized the book for misleading the reader by taking quotations and details out of context. Time magazine's review was also critical of Baker's style: "facts, even tragic ones, require context and interpretation. They don't speak for themselves. That's why we need historians." British historian Dominic Sandbrook referred to the "mendaciousness, even fraudulence, of this extraordinarily self-righteous book" and contended that many of Baker's assertions, such as that Franklin Roosevelt conspired to provoke the Japanese into bombing Pearl Harbor, were not new and had been refuted long ago by scholarly historians. In a very harsh review, literary critic Adam Kirsch was especially critical of Baker's use of Nazi propaganda: "by reproducing Nazi language uncritically, Mr. Baker effectively endorses it. This is never more shocking than when he quotes Joseph Goebbels's description of Churchill.... A book that can adduce Goebbels as an authority in order to vilify Churchill has clearly lost touch with all moral and intellectual bearings. No one who knows about World War II will take Human Smoke at all seriously." Conservative political commentator R. Emmett Tyrrell, Jr., awarded Human Smoke his J. Gordon Coogler Award for Worst Book of 2008.

Other reviewers praised the book's use of documentary research as well as its intricate construction. Irish novelist Colm Toibin wrote in his New York Times review that "the issues Baker wishes to raise, and the stark system he has used to dramatize his point, make his book a serious and conscientious contribution to the debate about pacifism." Tim Adams wrote a mixed review in The Guardian, stating, "What if we had all stood outside and waited for Hitler's raving to end and then gone on as before? It is a crucial question and one that has rarely been better articulated than in Human Smoke. But it invites an insistent supplementary, too: is it possible that by investing too much attention in detail, you always risk missing the bigger picture?" Pacifist Mark Kurlansky wrote for the Los Angeles Times that the book demonstrated that "World War II was one of the biggest, most carefully plotted lies in modern history" and that "people are going to get really angry at Baker for criticizing their favorite war. But he hasn't fashioned his tale from gossip. It is documented, with copious notes and attributions. The grace of these well-ordered snapshots is that there is no diatribe; you are left to put things together yourself. Human Smoke may be one of the most important books you will ever read."

== See also ==
- Allies at War by Tim Bouverie (2025)
- The Second World War by Antony Beevor (2012).
- Inferno: The World at War, 1939-1945 by Max Hastings (2011).
- The Storm of War by Andrew Roberts (2009).
