= Amanda Urban =

American literary agent

Amanda "Binky" Urban
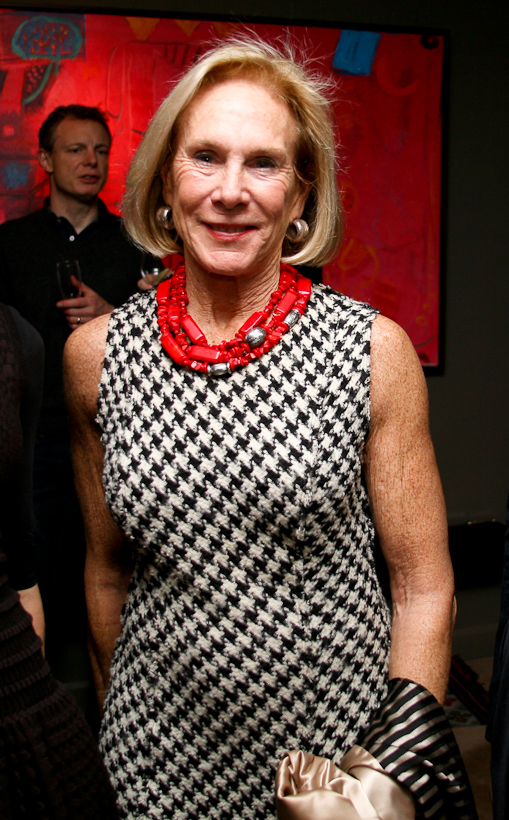
- Urban in 2011
- Born: 1946 or 1947 (age 79–80)
- Education: Wheaton College (Massachusetts)
- Occupation: Literary Agent
- Spouse: Ken Auletta
- Awards: 2010 Maxwell E. Perkins Award

Amanda "Binky" Urban is an American literary agent and partner at ICM Partners.

Urban started at ICM as a literary agent, worked as Co-Director of the ICM Literary Department in New York, and had been Managing Director of ICM Books in London from 2002 to 2008. Before ICM, she was General Manager of New York Magazine and The Village Voice, and Editorial Manager of Esquire Magazine.

In December 2010, the Center for Fiction awarded Urban the Maxwell E. Perkins Award in recognition of her work and contribution to the field of fiction writing. She was the first book agent selected to receive the award.

Urban attended Kent Place School and graduated from Wheaton College in Massachusetts as an English major in 1968.

She has represented dozens of authors, among them Jennifer Egan, Bret Easton Ellis, Nora Ephron, and Cormac McCarthy. She was representing Donna Tartt for three decades until Tartt very publicly fired her in 2017. Urban also works with Nobel Prize recipient Kazuo Ishiguro and Japanese novelist Haruki Murakami.
