= The Mezzanine =

1988 novel by Nicholson Baker

- First edition
- Author: Nicholson Baker
- Language: English
- Publisher: Weidenfeld & Nicolson
- Publication date: 1988
- Publication place: United States
- Media type: Print (Paperback)
- Pages: 144pp
- ISBN: 978-0-679-72576-3
- OCLC: 20167522
- Dewey Decimal: 813/.54 20
- LC Class: PS3552.A4325 M49 1990
- Followed by: Room Temperature

The Mezzanine (1988) is the first novel by American writer Nicholson Baker. It narrates what goes through a man's mind during a modern lunch break.

== Concept ==
On the surface, the novel deals with a man's lunchtime trip up an escalator in the mezzanine of the office building where he works (a building based on Baker's recollections of Rochester's Midtown Plaza). The substance of the novel, however, is taken up with the thoughts that run through a person's mind in any given few moments, and the ideas that might result if they were given the time to think these thoughts through to their conclusions. The Mezzanine tells this story through the extensive use of footnotes—some of them comprising the bulk of the page—as the narrator travels through his own mind and past. The footnotes are quite detailed and sometimes diverge into multiple levels of abstraction. Near the end of the book, there is a multi-page footnote on the subject of footnotes themselves.

== Plot ==
The Mezzanine is essentially plotless, a stream-of-consciousness fiction that examines in detail the lunch-hour activities of young office worker Howie, whose simple lunch (popcorn, hot dog, cookie and milk) and purchase of a new pair of shoelaces are contrasted with his reading of a paperback edition of Marcus Aurelius's Meditations. Baker's digressive novel, partly composed of extensive footnotes of up to several pages in length, follows Howie's contemplations of a variety of everyday phenomena, such as how paper milk cartons replaced glass milk bottles, the miracle of perforation, and the buoyant nature of plastic straws; and of everyday objects such as vending machines, paper towel dispensers, and popcorn poppers.

== Critical reception ==
The novel was praised for its originality and linguistic virtuosity. Critics cited Baker's trademark style of highly descriptive, focused prose, his "fierce attention to detail," and his delight in portraying discrete slices of time within the frame of mundane existence. The Mezzanine created the genre of digressive, annotational metafiction for which Baker is best known, and of which he may be the boldest representative. The academic website eNotes.com remarks that "Like Proust, [Baker] makes the personal significant." New Yorker writer Laura Miller praised Baker's "dazzling descriptive powers married to a passionate enthusiasm for the neglected flotsam and jetsam of everyday life."
