= James McIntyre (poet) =

Scottish-Canadian poet (died 1906)

James McIntyre (baptised 25 May 1828 – 31 March 1906) was a Scottish poet who emigrated to Upper Canada in 1851. He is sometimes called "The Cheese Poet", as cheese was a recurring theme in many of his poems.

== Life and works ==
McIntyre was born in Forres, Scotland, in 1828 and immigrated to Upper Canada. He worked as a hired hand to begin with, performing pioneer chores that formed the basis of a number of his works. Later, he settled in St. Catharines, Upper Canada, where he dealt in furniture. There he married and had a daughter and son John William McIntyre.

He later moved to Ingersoll, then a town of 5,000 on the banks of the Thames in Oxford County; depending on when he moved it was either in Upper Canada or Canada West, the heart of Canadian dairy country at the time. He opened a furniture factory on the river as well as a store which sold furniture, along with such items as pianos and coffins.

He was well loved in the community, from which he often received aid in hard times.

The ancient poets ne'er did dream
That Canada was land of cream,
They ne'er imagined it could flow
In this cold land of ice and snow,
Where everything did solid freeze
They ne'er hoped or looked for cheese.

from "Oxford Cheese Ode"

The Toronto Globe ran his pieces as comic relief, and the New York Tribune expressed amusement, but their mockery did not dampen his enthusiasm. He is assumed to have continued writing until his death, in 1906.

He published two volumes of poetry:

Musings on the Canadian Thames (1884)
and
Poems of James McIntyre (1889).

McIntyre was forgotten after his death for a number of years, until his work was rediscovered and reprinted by William Arthur Deacon—literary editor of the Toronto Mail and Empire and its successor The Globe and Mail—in his book The Four Jameses (1927).

In recent years a volume of his work, Oh! Queen of Cheese: Selections from James McIntyre, the Cheese Poet (ed. Roy A. Abramson; Toronto: Cherry Tree, 1979) collected his poems together with a variety of cheese recipes and anecdotes. However, the greatest boost to his fame probably came from a number of his poems being anthologized in the collection Very Bad Poetry, edited by Ross and Kathryn Petras (Vintage, 1997). This included his masterpiece and possibly best-known poem, "Ode on the Mammoth Cheese Weighing Over 7,000 Pounds", written about an actual cheese produced in Ingersoll in 1866 and sent to exhibitions in Toronto, New York, and Britain:

We have seen thee, Queen of Cheese,
Lying quietly at your ease,
Gently fanned by evening breeze;
Thy fair form no flies dare seize.

All gaily dressed, soon you'll go
To the provincial show,
To be admired by many a beau
In the city of Toronto.

from "Ode on the Mammoth Cheese"

== Legacy ==
An annual poetry contest is held in Ingersoll, Ontario, to honour McIntyre. The contest is sponsored by The Ingersoll Times and the Corporation of the Town of Ingersoll, and includes a cheese-themed poetry competition.

== See also ==
- William Topaz McGonagall
- Julia A. Moore
- Poetaster
- Paula Nancy Millstone Jennings, the minor character from A Hitchhiker's Guide to the Galaxy
