= The Anthologist =

2009 novel by Nicholson Baker

- Author: Nicholson Baker
- Genre: Literary fiction
- Publisher: Simon & Schuster
- Publication date: September 2009
- ISBN: 978-1-4165-7244-2

The Anthologist is a novel about poetry by Nicholson Baker, which was first published in 2009.

Its protagonist is Paul Chowder, a poet with a commission to prepare and edit an anthology of poetry, Only Rhyme. The novel shows his life, thoughts, aspirations and struggles with writer's block.

== Reception ==
Michael Schmidt, reviewing the book for The Independent, gave it a mixed reception,

The ineffectual protagonist is a beguiling misfit, advancing at tangents, a pair of ragged claws. The novel misfires when this voice is overridden by that of the author who makes Chowder into his own spokesman, giving him opinions on Larkin, Marinetti or Pound, either at odds with the character or outside the parameters of the novel.

David Orr, reviewing for The New York Times, liked the novel's portrayal of, and engagement with, the world of poets and poetry,

Yet somehow Nicholson Baker has written a novel about poetry that’s actually about poetry — and that is also startlingly perceptive and ardent, both as a work of fiction and as a representation of the kind of thinking that poetry readers do.

Booklist, Kirkus Reviews, and Publishers Weekly also reviewed the novel.

== Poets and works discussed ==
Chapter 1

- Sir Walter Scott
- Edward Lear
- Dr. Seuss
- Rudyard Kipling
- Sidney Lanier
- Derek Attridge (academic)

Chapter 2

- Alice Quinn (The New Yorker poetry editor)
- Paul Muldoon (editor)
- Edgar Allan Poe - The Raven

Chapter 3

- Mina Loy
- Howard Moss
- W. D. Snodgrass

Chapter 4

- Mary Oliver
- Louise Bogan
- W. H. Auden - Musée des Beaux Arts
- Thomas Babington Macaulay - Lays of Ancient Rome

Chapter 5

- Amy Lowell
- James Wright
- Haiku

Chapter 6

- Thomas Campion
- Samuel Daniel
- Coventry Patmore
- W. S. Merwin
- Ezra Pound

Chapter 7

- Elizabeth Bishop
- Alfred, Lord Tennyson

Chapter 8

- Filippo Tommaso Marinetti
- Robert Herrick - To the Virgins, to Make Much of Time
- Horace - Carpe Diem

Chapter 9

- Walt Whitman
- Ted Kooser
- Karl Shapiro
- John Dryden
- Elizabeth Bishop - The Fish

Chapter 10

- Alfred, Lord Tennyson - The Charge of the Light Brigade
- Vachel Lindsay
- Sara Teasdale
- Allen Ginsberg

Chapter 11

- John Greenleaf Whittier
- Henry Wadsworth Longfellow

Chapter 12

- Algernon Charles Swinburne
- Ted Roethke
- Aphra Behn

Chapter 13

- Carl Sandburg

Chapter 14

- John Dryden - Mac Flecknoe
- Samuel Johnson

Chapter 15

- James Fenton - The Vapour Trail
- John Ashbery
