= Julia A. Moore =

American poet (1847–1920)

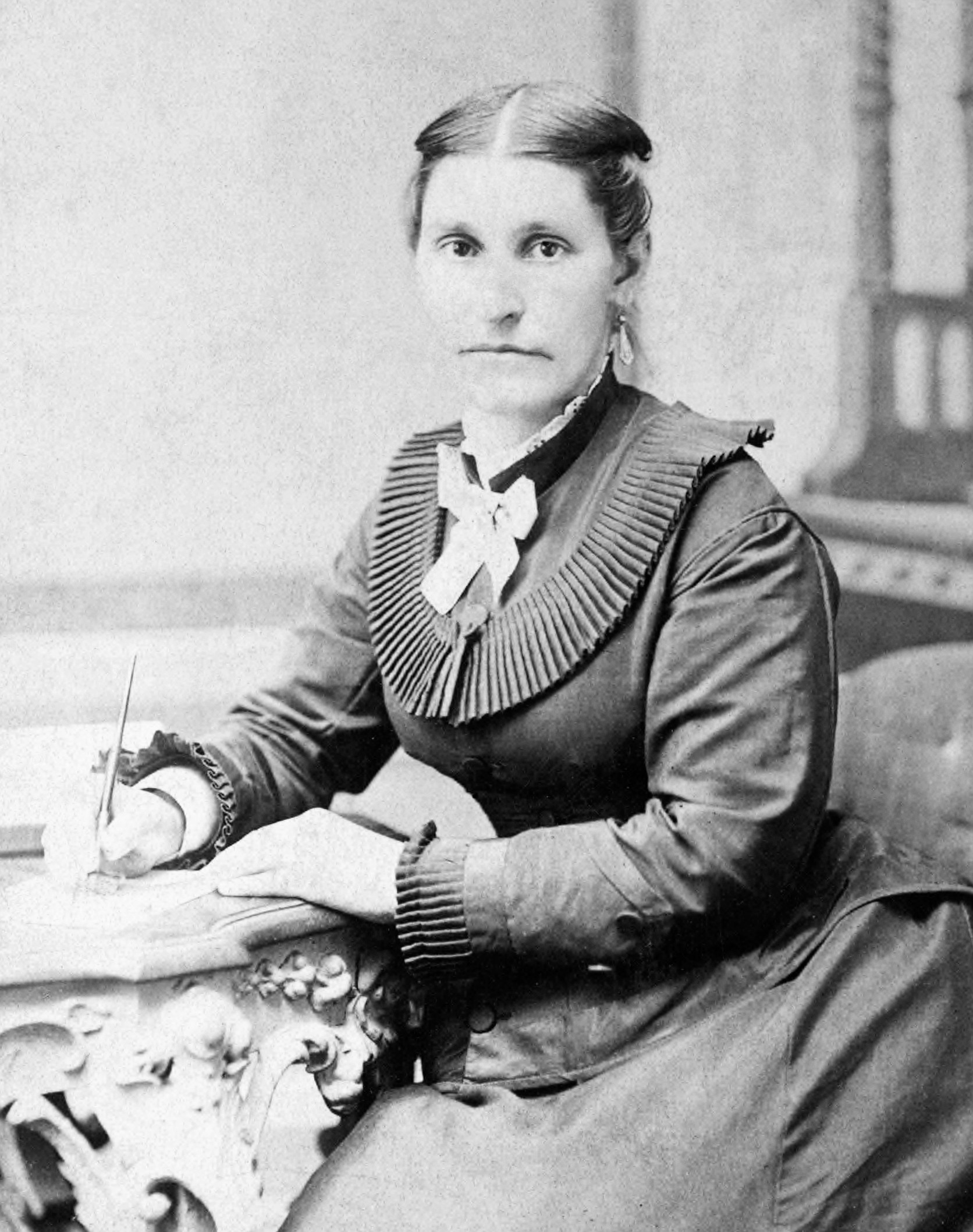
Moore, c. 1877

Julia Ann Moore (née Julia Ann Davis; December 1, 1847 – June 5, 1920) was an American poet widely considered a poetaster. Like Scotland's William McGonagall, she is best known for writing notoriously bad poetry.

== Biography ==
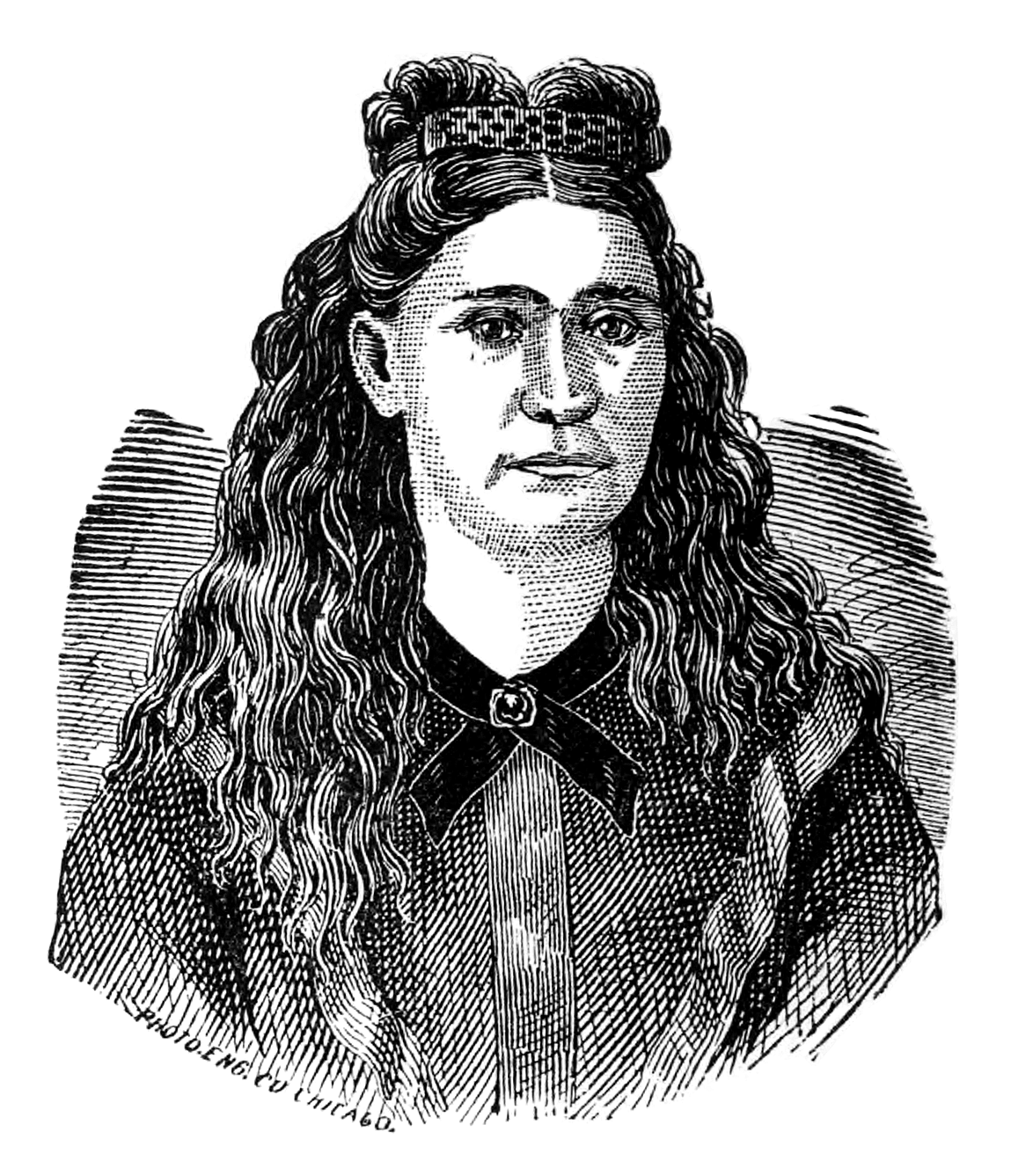
"Literary is a work very difficult to do" ~ Julia A. Moore

Moore grew up on her family's Michigan farm, the eldest of four children. When she was ten, her mother became ill, and Julia assumed many of her mother's responsibilities. Her formal education was thereby limited. In her mid-teens, she started writing poetry and songs, mostly in response to the death of children she knew, but any newspaper account of disaster could inspire her.

At age 17, Moore married Frederick Franklin Moore, a farmer. She ran a small store and, over the years, bore ten children, of whom six survived to adulthood. She continued to write poetry and songs.

Moore's first book of verse, The Sentimental Song Book, was published in 1876 by C. M. Loomis of Grand Rapids, and quickly went into a second printing. A copy ended up in the hands of James F. Ryder, a Cleveland publisher, who republished it under the title The Sweet Singer of Michigan Salutes the Public. Ryder sent out numerous review copies to newspapers across the country, with a cover letter filled with low-key mock praise. This led to Moore receiving national attention. Following Ryder's lead, contemporary reviews were amusedly negative. The Rochester Democrat wrote of Sweet Singer that:

Shakespeare, could he read it, would be glad that he was dead …. If Julia A. Moore would kindly deign to shed some of her poetry on our humble grave, we should be but too glad to go out and shoot ourselves tomorrow.

The Hartford Daily Times said that

to meet such steady and unremitting demands on the lachrymal ducts one must be provided, as Sam Weller suspected Job Trotter was, 'with a main, as is allus let on.'…

The collection became a best-seller, though it is unclear whether this was due to public amusement with Moore's poetry or genuine appreciation of the self-admittedly "sentimental" character of her poems. It was, more or less, the last gasp of the school of obituary poetry that had been broadly popular in the U.S. throughout the mid-19th century.

Moore gave a reading and singing performance with orchestral accompaniment in 1877, at a Grand Rapids opera house, and somehow misinterpreted the jeering of the audience as criticism of the orchestra. Moore's second collection, A Few Choice Words to the Public, appeared in 1878, but found few buyers. Moore gave a second public performance in late 1878 at the same opera house. By that time she had figured out that the praise directed to her was false and the jeering sincere. She began by admitting her poetry was "partly full of mistakes" and that "literary is a work very hard to do". After the poetry and the laughter and jeering in response was over, Moore ended the show by telling the audience:

You have come here and paid twenty-five cents to see a fool; I receive seventy-five dollars, and see a whole houseful of fools.

Afterwards, Moore's husband forbade her to publish any more poetry. Three more poems were eventually published, and she would write poems for friends. In 1880, she also published a short serialized story, "Lost and Found", a strongly moralistic story about a drunkard, and a novella, "Sunshine and Shadow", a peculiar romance set during the American Revolution. The ending of "Sunshine and Shadow" was perhaps intended to be self-referential: the farmer facing foreclosure is gratefully rescued by his wife's publishing her secret cache of fiction.

According to some reports, Moore's husband was not grateful, but embarrassed. Shamed or not, he moved the family 100 miles north to Manton in 1882. Moore's notoriety was known in Manton, but the locals respected her, and she did not cooperate with occasional reporters trying to revisit her past. They were a successful business couple, he with an orchard and sawmill, she with a store.

Moore's husband died in 1914. The next year, she republished "Sunshine and Shadow" in pamphlet form. She spent much of her widowhood "melancholy", sitting on her porch. She died quietly in 1920. The news of her death was widely reported.

== Poetry ==
Some comparison to William McGonagall is worth making. Unlike McGonagall, Moore commanded a fairly wide variety of meters and forms, albeit the majority of her verse was in the ballad meter. Like McGonagall, she held a maidenly bluestocking's allegiance to the Temperance movement, and frequently wrote odes to the joys of sobriety. Most importantly, like McGonagall, she was drawn to themes of accident, disaster, and sudden death; as has been said of A. E. Housman's A Shropshire Lad, in her pages you can count the dead and wounded. Edgar Wilson Nye called her "worse than a Gatling gun". Here, she is inspired by the Great Chicago Fire:

The great Chicago Fire, friends,
Will never be forgot;
In the history of Chicago
It will remain a darken spot.
It was a dreadful horrid sight
To see that City in flames;
But no human aid could save it,
For all skill was tried in vain.

Her less morbid side is on display in the hymn Temperance Reform Clubs:

Many a man joined the club
That never drank a drachm,
Those noble men were kind and brave
They care not for the slang –
The slang they meet on every side:
"You're a reform drunkard, too;
You've joined the red ribbon brigade,
Among the drunkard crew."

She did not approve of the life and acts of Lord Byron:

The character of "Lord Byron"
Was of a low degree,
Caused by his reckless conduct,
And bad company.
He sprung from an ancient house,
Noble, but poor, indeed.
His career on earth, was marred
By his own misdeeds.

== Influence ==
Mark Twain was a self-described fan of Moore, though not for the reasons she would have preferred. Twain alluded to her work in his travelogue Following the Equator, and it is widely assumed that she served as a literary model for the character of Emmeline Grangerford in Adventures of Huckleberry Finn. Grangerford's funereal ode to Stephen Dowling Botts:

O no. Then list with tearful eye,
Whilst I his fate do tell.
His soul did from this cold world fly
By falling down a well.

They got him out and emptied him;
Alas it was too late;
His spirit was gone for to sport aloft
In the realms of the good and great.

— (Twain)

is not far removed from Moore's poems on subjects like Little Libbie:

One more little spirit to Heaven has flown,
To dwell in that mansion above,
Where dear little angels, together roam,
In God's everlasting love.

— (Moore)

Moore was also the inspiration for comic poet Ogden Nash, as he acknowledged in his first book. His daughter reported that Moore's work convinced Nash to become a "great bad poet" instead of a "bad good poet". The Oxford Companion to American Literature describes Nash as using Moore's

hyperdithyrambic meters, pseudo-poetic inversions, gangling asymmetrical lines, extremely pat or elaborately inexact rimes, parenthetical dissertations, and unexpected puns.

Selections of Moore's writings appeared in D. B. Wyndham-Lewis and Charles Lee's Stuffed Owl anthology and in other collections of bad poetry. Most of her poetry was reprinted in a 1928 edition, which can be found online. Her complete poetry and prose, with biography, notes, and references, can be found in the Riedlinger edited collection Mortal Refrains. Most poetry collections reprint the latest, "best", versions of their contents, but Riedlinger adopted the opposite philosophy.

Moore has been grouped into the Western Michigan School of Bad Versemakers. Her local contemporaries – including Dr. William Fuller, S.H. Ewell, J.B. Smiley, and Fred Yapple – do not appear to have had relationships with each other, but their proximity and similar penchant for exceptionally laughable verse have led to their posthumous grouping.

Since 1994, the Flint Public Library has held the Julia A. Moore Poetry Festival to celebrate bad poetry.

== See also ==
- James McIntyre
- Amanda McKittrick Ros
- Obituary poetry
