= Derek Nikitas =

American author

- Born: December 13, 1974 (age 51); Manchester, NH, United States
- Education: State University of New York College at Brockport (BA), University of North Carolina at Wilmington (MFA)
- Occupation: Writer
- Spouse: Caroline Reed Nikitas
- Writing career
- Language: English
- Period: Contemporary
- Genre: Crime fiction
- Notable works: Pyres; The Long Division
- Website: dereknikitas.com

Derek Nikitas (born December 13, 1974) is an American author known for his novels Pyres and The Long Division. His short fiction has appeared in Ellery Queen's Mystery Magazine, The Ontario Review, Chelsea and New South. Nikitas is also a professor at the University of Rhode Island.

== Early life and education ==
Nikitas was born December 13, 1974, and was raised in Manchester, New Hampshire and Fairport, New York. He received a Bachelor of Arts in English from the State University of New York College at Brockport in 1997, a Master of Fine Arts in fiction writing from the University of North Carolina at Wilmington in 2000, and a Doctor of Philosophy from Georgia State University.

== Career ==
Nikitas taught at the State University of New York at Brockport and Delta College. Starting in 2008, he became an assistant professor at Eastern Kentucky University, where he directed the low-residency MFA creative writing program, the Bluegrass Writers Studio. As of May 2024, he teaches English and Creative Writing at the University of Rhode Island.

Nikitas has published many short stories. His short story "Wonder", published in the Ontario Review, was nominated for a Pushcart Prize by Joyce Carol Oates. Nikitas's debut novel, Pyres, was published by Minotaur Books in 2007, and was nominated for the Edgar Allan Poe Award for Best First Novel. His sophomore novel, The Long Division, was published by Minotaur Books in October 2009. His third novel, a science fiction novel for young Adults, Extra Life, was published by Polis Books in 2015.

Nikitas has cowritten two "BookShots" novellas with James Patterson, Diary of a Succubus (2017) and You've Been Warned—Again (2017). A third novella, The Murder of Stephen King, was canceled before release.

Nikitas' work has been translated into several languages including Japanese, Italian, French, and German. The German translation, Scheiterhaufen, was selected as 'Crime Novel of the Month' by Radio House Europe.

== Personal life ==
After receiving his MFA, Nikitas traveled abroad, spending time living in Costa Rice, England, and the Czech Republic, during which time he focused on writing.

Nikitas is married to Caroline Reed Nikitas.

== Publications ==
=== Novels ===
- Nikitas, Derek (2007). Pyres. Minotaur Books. ISBN 978-0-312-36397-0.
- Nikitas, Derek (2009). The Long Division. Minotaur Books. ISBN 978-0-312-36398-7.
- Nikitas, Derek (2015). Extra Life. Polis Books. ISBN 978-1-940610-53-5.

=== Novellas ===
- Patterson, James; Nikitas, Derek (2017). You've Been Warned—Again. Little, Brown.
- Patterson, James; Nikitas, Derek (2017). Diary of a Succubus. Little, Brown.

=== Short stories ===
- Nikitas, Derek (1999). "Do You Know Thom Hoover?". Ontario Review. 51: 105–116.
- Nikitas, Derek (2001). "Damage". Ontario Review. 54: 116–127.
- Nikitas, Derek (2004). "Hungry". Chelsea (76): 18–29.
- Nikitas, Derek (September–October 2004). "Skippy". Ellery Queen Mystery Magazine: 80–88.
- Nikitas, Derek (Winter 2004). "Wonder". Ontario Review. 61: 22–37.
- Nikitas, Derek (March–April 2005). "Waiting". Ellery Queen Mystery Magazine (33): 123–133.
- Nikitas, Derek (April–June 2006). "All Nite Video". The Pedestal Magazine (33).
- Nikitas, Derek (2008). "Runaway". In Child, Lee (ed.). Killer Year: Stories to Die For. St. Martin’s Press. pp. 192–211.
- Nikitas, Derek (2008). "My Flick". New South. 1 (2): 147–148.
- Nikitas, Derek (October 2008). "Razor". Thuglit (2p).
- Nikitas, Derek (November 2008). "Bronze Horsemen". Plots with Guns. 4.
- Nikitas, Derek (2009). "All Nite Video". Show and Tell: Writers on Writing (6th ed.). The Publishing Laboratory: University of North Carolina at Wilmington. pp. 70–80.
- Nikitas, Derek (2010). "My Dolly". In Golden, Chris (ed.). The New Dead. St. Martin’s Griffin. pp. 213–228.
- Nikitas, Derek (Winter–Spring 2012). "Voicemail". Washington Square. pp. 58–59.
- Nikitas, Derek (2014). "Runaway". In Kiesbye, Stephan (ed.). Amazon Story Front. pp. 11–51.
- Nikitas, Derek (November 2016). "We're in the market for a fixer-upper". Five Points. 17 (2).
- Nikitas, Derek (2017). "The Call". In Kiesbye, Stephan (ed.). Cover Stories. Volt Books. pp. 11–51.
