= J. Gordon Coogler =

American poet (1865–1901)

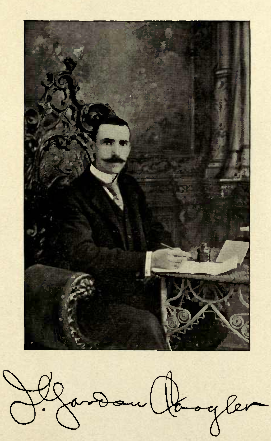
Portrait and signature of J. Gordon Coogler, from the frontispiece of his Purely Original Verse.

John Brown Gordon Coogler (December 3, 1865 – September 9, 1901) was a self-taught American poet who achieved notoriety during his lifetime as a prolific producer of bad verse. Essayist H.L. Mencken is credited with assuring Coogler's lasting fame as a poetaster by mocking him as an example of the supposedly poor state of arts and letters in the American South.

== Life ==
Coogler was born in South Carolina and never left the state. He opened a job printing shop advertising "Poems Written While You Wait." Although his verses attracted ridicule, he sought to promote his business by distributing self-published booklets of original poems. According to his obituary in the Columbia State newspaper, Coogler published five thousand short collections of original verse during his lifetime, besides two versions of his book-length collection titled Purely Original Verse.

Coogler's verse attracted mocking attention from prominent American magazines, including Puck and Munsey's Magazine. Coogler once complained in verse about what he considered the unfairness of literary critics:

Oh you critics! — If an author errs in a single line,
That line you'll surely quote,
And will give it as a sample fair
Of all he ever wrote.

== Legacy ==
Nearly two decades after Coogler's death, H.L. Mencken selected the following brief poem as the motto of his 1920 essay "The Sahara of the Bozart”:

Alas! for the South, her books have grown fewer—
She never was much given to literature.

Mencken went on to mock Southern literature by crowning Coogler as "the last bard of Dixie."

From the 1890s into the 20th century, newspapers quoted that unintentionally humorous couplet, often from memory and in garbled form. Little else about Coogler was remembered besides the one couplet and his identity as a southerner.

In the late 20th century conservative political commentator Emmett Tyrrell invented the annual J. Gordon Coogler Award as a booby prize for the "worst book of the year." The announcement of the prize has appeared annually in conservative organs including Human Events and The American Spectator. According to literary critic Bryan Giemza, other "mock-serious Coogler societies" have granted awards for bad writing.

=== Legacy in South Carolina ===
Coogler's reputation has been less negative in his home state, where some have expressed appreciation for his naive verse. The town of Blythewood, South Carolina held a "Coogler Festival" in the poet's honor in November 1983.

Purely Original Verse was reprinted in 1974 by Vogue Press of Columbia, South Carolina.

In 1985, Irene LaBorde Neuffer published Coogler Revisited, a book devoted to the poet.

The personal papers of J. Gordon Coogler are housed at the University of South Carolina.

== Works ==
- Purely Original Verse, 5 editions (1891-1897).
- Purely Original Verse: Complete Works, and a Number of New Productions, in One Volume, 2 editions (1897 , 1901).
