= Elephind =

Search engine for historic digitized newspapers

- Website type: Search engine
- Creator: Stefan Boddie
- Website: www.elephind.com
- Launched: May 30, 2012; 14 years ago
- Current status: Version 2 launched in September 2025
- The website went offline in 2023, and was relaunched in September 2025

Elephind.com is a search engine for digitized versions of historic newspapers from various countries, with the goal of making it possible to search all digitized historic newspapers from a single website. As of July 2021, 3,600,000 newspaper issues were accessible on the website, many of them not accessible through Google. The website was shut down mid-October 2023 and was relaunched in September 2025 with semantic (smart) search capabilities and an AI-Assistant tool.

== Function ==
Elephind is a search engine specifically for digitized versions of historical newspapers, allowing the user to freely search across various newspaper archive websites instead of visiting each individual site. When the user clicked on a search result, they were directed to the online archive where it could be accessed. The collection was international, with newspapers from various countries included.

As of July 2021, 3,600,000 newspapers issues were accessible on Elephind. Many of the newspapers were on the deep web and could not be accessed through other search engines such as Google.

Optional registration allowed users to bookmark and comment on newspapers.

Elephind used software from Veridian Software, which was spun out of Greenstone.
