= Checkpoint (novel) =

2004 novel

- First edition (publ. Knopf)
- Author: Nicholson Baker
- Publisher: Alfred A. Knopf
- Publication date: August 1, 2004
- ISBN: 978-1-400-04400-9

Checkpoint is a 2004 novel by American author Nicholson Baker in 2004.

== Plot summary ==
The main characters are two men, Jay and Ben. The novel consists of their dialogues in a hotel room in Washington, D.C., in May 2004. The story begins with Jay asking Ben to go to Jay's hotel room. From that conversation it is inferred that Jay is depressed: the women in his life have abandoned him; he has lost his job as a high school teacher and now works as a day laborer; he has declared bankruptcy; and spends his days reading blogs.

Jay explains to Ben that he has decided he must, "for the good of humankind", assassinate President George W. Bush, and then kill himself. Ben, who symbolizes American modern liberalism, spends his time trying to persuade Jay to cancel his "mission".

The novel ends inconclusively, the reader left unaware of whether Jay is going to go through with his plan.

== Major themes ==
Jay spends most of his time denouncing the Iraq War. Ben's principal argument against Jay's decision to assassinate Bush in order to stop the war is that killing Bush would provoke more bloodshed. Book reviewers and critics have identified Jay as the political extremist in the argument of Checkpoint.

== See also ==
- Death of a President
