= Poetaster =

Poet lacking artistic ability

Poetaster (/poʊɪtæstər/), like rhymester or versifier, is a derogatory term applied to bad or inferior poets. Specifically, poetaster has implications of unwarranted pretensions to artistic value. The word was coined in Latin by Erasmus in 1521. It was first used in English by Ben Jonson in his 1600 play Cynthia's Revels; immediately afterwards Jonson chose it as the title of his 1601 play Poetaster. In that play the "poetaster" character is a satire on John Marston, one of Jonson's rivals in the Poetomachia or War of the Theatres.

== Usage ==
While poetaster has always been a negative appraisal of a poet's skills, rhymester (or rhymer) and versifier have held ambiguous meanings depending on the commentator's opinion of a writer's verse. Versifier is often used to refer to someone who produces work in verse with the implication that while technically able to make lines rhyme they have no real talent for poetry. Rhymer on the other hand is usually impolite.

The faults of a poetaster frequently include errors or lapses in their work's meter, badly rhyming words which jar rather than flow, oversentimentality, too much use of the pathetic fallacy and unintentionally bathetic choice of subject matter. Although a mundane subject in the hands of some great poets can be raised to the level of art, such as On First Looking into Chapman's Homer by John Keats or Ode on the Death of a Favourite Cat, Drowned in a Tub of Gold Fishes by Thomas Gray, others merely produce bizarre poems on bizarre subjects, an example being James McIntyre, who wrote mainly of cheese.

Other poets often regarded as poetasters are William Topaz McGonagall, Julia A. Moore, Edgar Guest, J. Gordon Coogler, Dmitry Khvostov, and Alfred Austin. Austin, despite having been a British poet laureate, is nevertheless regarded as greatly inferior to his predecessor, Alfred Lord Tennyson. Austin was frequently mocked during his career and is little read today. The American poet Joyce Kilmer (1886–1918), known for his 1913 poem "Trees", is often criticized for his overly sentimental and traditional verse written at the dawn of Modernist poetry, although some of his poems are frequently anthologized and retain enduring popular appeal. "Trees" has been parodied innumerable times, including by Ogden Nash.

== Modern use ==
Musician Joanna Newsom on the album The Milk-eyed Mender uses the term to refer to a struggling narrator wracked with ambition to create beautiful poetry in a verse from "Inflammatory Writ":

And as for my inflammatory writ?
Well, I wrote it and I was not inflamed one bit.
Advice from the master derailed that disaster;
he said "Hand that pen over to me, poetaster"

Rapper Big Daddy Kane uses an adjectival form as an insult in his song "Uncut, Pure":

Your poetasterous style it plain bore me
Pardon the vainglory, but here's the Kane story

The band Miracle Fortress has a song entitled "Poetaster".

In Wake Up Dead Man: A Knives Out Mystery, Lee Ross refers to political influencer Cy Draven as an "opportunistic poetaster".

== Variants ==
In the sense that a poetaster is a pretended poet, John Marston coined the term parasitaster, for one who pretends to be a parasite or sycophant, in his play Parasitaster, or The Fawn (1604). Later in the 17th century (the earliest cited use is from 1684) appeared the term criticaster for an inferior and pretentious critic.

== See also ==
- Doggerel
- Vogon poetry
