= Vox (Baker novel) =

1992 novel by Nicholson Baker

- First edition (publ. Random House)
- Author: Nicholson Baker
- Language: English
- Publisher: Random House
- Publication date: 1992
- ISBN: 0-394-58995-5 (first edition)
- Dewey Decimal: 813.54
- LC Class: PS3552.A4325 V6

Vox is a 1992 novel by Nicholson Baker that spent several weeks on the New York Times best-seller list.

== Plot overview ==
A man and a woman become acquainted over a chat line, sharing their sexual turn-ons, fantasies, and experiences, along with some nonsexual fascinations and some contextualizing details about their daily lives. The story consists almost entirely of their dialogue, which demonstrates their vivid imaginations, their vulnerability and quirks, and their ability to communicate their personalities to each other in a highly articulate manner.

== Reception ==
=== On release ===
On the release of Vox, Publishers Weekly declared it was "unaccountably self-indulgent" and that "Baker's inestimable gift, evinced in the other books, for describing the indescribable with absolutely spot-on flourishes are nowhere to be found in Vox." For The Village Voice, it "simply ushers us into the back pages of a glossy magazine", whereas The New York Times Book Review found it "a compelling and irresistible take, a tour-de-force illustration of the fantasy inherent in eroticism." For James Kaplan, writing in Vanity Fair, "the book achieves between its two geographically distanced protagonists the kind of intimacy that all of us, from Bible-thumpers to leather fanciers yearn for. Vox is that rarest of rarities: a warm turn on".

=== Later ===
Writing in The New York Times in 2011, Charles McGrath declared Vox to be a "phone-sex novel so steamy that Monica Lewinsky gave it as a gift to Bill Clinton." Baker's editor in the 1990s, David Rosenthal commented that "when Vox came in, I thought it was both hilarious and horny [...] I kept thinking, 'Where on earth did this come from?'"
