= American Newspaper Repository =

Archive

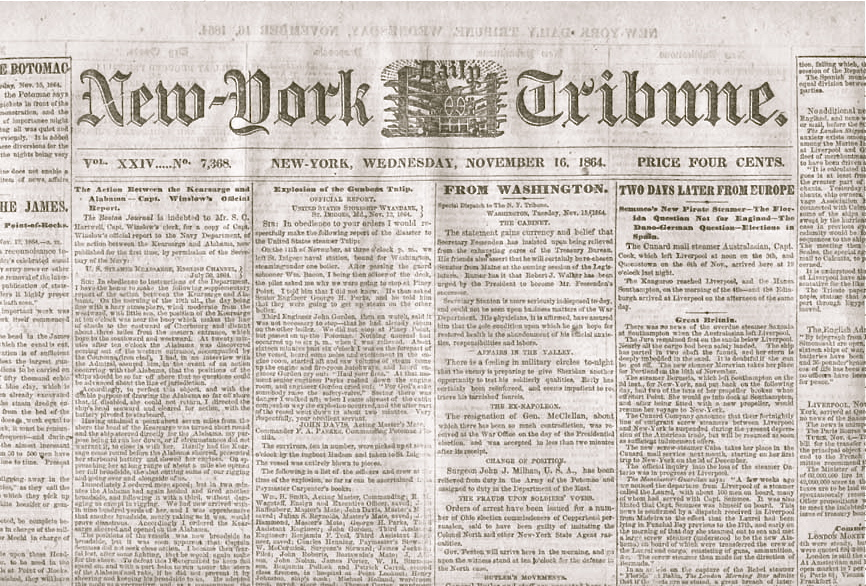
An early issue of the New York Tribune

The American Newspaper Repository is a charity whose purpose is to collect and preserve original copies of American newspapers. It was founded in 1999 by the author Nicholson Baker when he learnt that the British Library was disposing of its collection of historic American newspapers. He cashed in his retirement fund to successfully bid for the collection at auction. With support from the Knight Foundation and MacArthur Foundation, the repository was established in a building in Salmon Falls Mill Historic District in Rollinsford, New Hampshire. While serving as a director, Baker researched and wrote Double Fold: Libraries and the Assault on Paper about the way in which other library institutions were destroying rather than preserving such originals.

The collection was transferred to the care of the David M. Rubenstein Rare Book & Manuscript Library, part of the Duke University Libraries, in 2004.

== Contents ==
The contents include runs of over a hundred different periodicals from between 1852 and 2004 including:

- Barron's Magazine 1926–1946
- Chicago Tribune 1888–1958
- New Republic 1913–1984
- New York Tribune and New York Herald Tribune 1866–1966
- The New York Times 1915–1958
- New York World 1898-1930
- Saturday Review 1924–1972

In total, there are about six thousand bound volumes and eleven thousand individual and bundled items. These include first printings of work by numerous famous authors such as H. L. Mencken, Mark Twain, Dorothy Parker, Robert Frost and Rudyard Kipling. The collection is an excellent archive of high quality rotogravure photographs which appeared in these periodicals. Other unusual formats include the first crosswords, needlepoint patterns, sheet music and full color reproductions of paintings of the period.
