= The Fermata =

1994 novel by Nicholson Baker

- First edition with fermata (pause) music notation
- Author: Nicholson Baker
- Language: English
- Publisher: Random House
- Publication date: March 1994
- Publication place: United States
- Media type: Print (hardback, paperback)
- Pages: 303
- ISBN: 9780679415862
- LC Class: 93026492

The Fermata is a 1994 erotic novel by Nicholson Baker. It is about a man named Arno Strine who can stop time, and uses this ability to embark on a series of sexual adventures. Like Baker's previous novel Vox, The Fermata was controversial among critics and a bestseller.

== Plot ==
Arno Strine, a temp in Boston, discovers he can stop time when he is a young man. He works on this power, and learns how to trigger and control these time stoppages. But instead of becoming rich or a diabolical criminal, Strine becomes an elaborate voyeur. He stops time so that he can see women naked, and eventually creates scenarios that he can watch after he allows time to start again. But despite his enjoyment of this power, Arno wants a real relationship, and he overcomes his shyness to begin a relationship. When he finally consummates this relationship, his power to stop time passes to his girlfriend, whose own time adventures begin. Arno works on the story of this time power, under the title "The Fermata."

== Reception ==
The view of critics on the book was mixed. In the Daily Telegraph, Victoria Glendinning wrote, "it is a moral challenge to be faced or it is simply meant as outrageous comedy, or as material for the sex-war, or as a portrait of a literary psychopath. Or it is an expression of male resentment of female autonomy. Whatever was intended, it is a repellent book. Goodbye Nicholson Baker, goodbye for ever." Commenting in the New York Times on the book's many pornographic episodes, Michele Slung said "I was either extremely bored or mildly offended by almost all of them, but mostly bored." In the opinion of The Times Literary Supplement, "where The Mezzanine and Vox were bristling with originality, this is a novel of one idea and 1,000 jokes."

In contrast, Tom Bissell argued in GQ that The Fermata was an "unlikely masterpiece" that set a "very high lit-porn standard." The Independent judged it "playfully erotic." Summing up the debate in the London Review of Books, Adam Mars-Jones wrote, "Nicholson Baker has chosen as the premise and conclusion of his novel an idea that contemporary culture has much difficulty with: the innocence of male sexual desire" and "if Baker had found a way of dramatising his theme, it would be a braver and less self-satisfied book."

== Screen adaptations ==
On June 16, 1998, it was reported that DreamWorks Pictures would produce Robert Zemeckis's film adaptation The Fermata, to be written by David Hollander. In 2002, Neil Gaiman wrote some drafts of a screenplay based on The Fermata, to be directed by Zemeckis. Gaiman's screenplay would have de-emphasized all the masturbation in the plot; instead he described his approach to the material as "Annie Hall with time-stopping." In 2013, the project was described as "dormant". In 2014, it was reported that Paramount Television would collaborate with Zemeckis on a television drama series based on The Fermata, to be written by Hollander.

== Sources ==
- www.powells.com
- books.regehr.org
- Entertainment Weekly.com
