= Room Temperature (novel) =

1990 novel by Nicholson Baker

- First edition
- Author: Nicholson Baker
- Language: English
- Publisher: Grove Press
- Publication date: April 1990
- Publication place: United States
- Media type: Print (hardback & paperback)
- Pages: 128
- ISBN: 0-8021-1224-2
- OCLC: 20933938
- Dewey Decimal: 813/.54 20
- LC Class: PS3552.A4325 R6 1990

Room Temperature is Nicholson Baker's second book, and continues the genre established in his first novel The Mezzanine, though this time the action spans a few minutes at the narrator's home (in Quincy, Massachusetts).

Mike is feeding his baby daughter, "the Bug", as her head rests in the crook of his arm. He blows in the direction of a mobile; twenty seconds and two dozen pages later, he is surprised to see the mobile move. Mike's thoughts wander as he contemplates, for example, the possibility of admitting to one's wife that one has been picking one's nose, or the juxtaposition of Debussy and Skippy peanut butter jars in a symphonic poem. The novel was received warmly but without great enthusiasm, as an enjoyable if slightly demure domestic follow-up to The Mezzanine.
