= Nicholson Baker =

Contemporary American novelist and writer (born 1957)

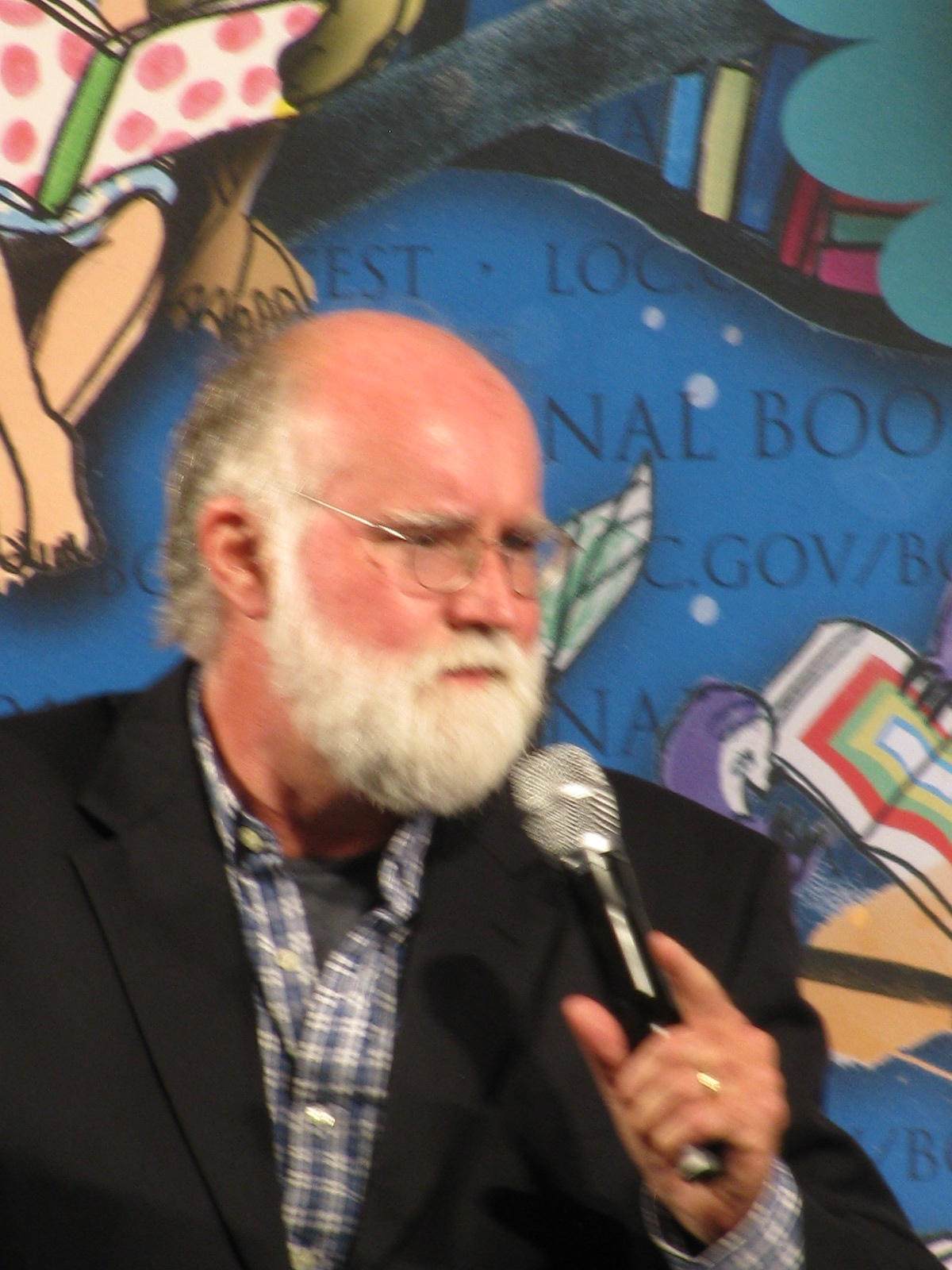
- Baker in 2013
- Born: January 7, 1957 (age 69); New York City, U.S.
- Education: Eastman School of Music
- Alma mater: Haverford College
- Writing career
- Language: English
- Genres: Novels, non-fiction, essays
- Notable works: The Mezzanine; The Fermata; Double Fold
- Website: nicholsonbaker.com

Nicholson Baker (born January 7, 1957) is an American novelist and essayist. His fiction generally de-emphasizes narrative in favor of careful description and characterization. His early novels such as The Mezzanine and Room Temperature were distinguished by their minute inspection of his characters' and narrators' stream of consciousness. Out of a total of ten novels, three are erotica: Vox, The Fermata and House of Holes.

Baker also writes non-fiction books. U and I: A True Story, about his relationship with John Updike, was published in 1991. He then wrote about the American library system in his 2001 book Double Fold: Libraries and the Assault on Paper, for which he received a National Book Critics Circle Award and the Calw Hermann Hesse Prize for the German translation. A pacifist, he wrote Human Smoke (2008) about the buildup to World War II.

Baker has published articles in Harper's Magazine, the London Review of Books and The New Yorker, among other periodicals. Baker created the American Newspaper Repository in 1999. He has also written about and edited Wikipedia.

== Life ==
Nicholson Baker was born in 1957 in New York City.

He studied briefly at the Eastman School of Music and received a B.A. in English from Haverford College.

Baker describes himself as an atheist, although he occasionally visits Quaker meetings. Baker says he has "always had pacifist leanings."

Baker met his wife, Margaret Brentano, in college; they live in Maine and have two grown children.

== Career ==
Baker established a name for himself with the novels The Mezzanine (1988) and Room Temperature (1990). Both novels have for the most part a very limited time span. The Mezzanine occurs over the course of an escalator journey and Room Temperature happens while a father feeds his baby daughter.

U and I: A True Story (1991) is a non-fiction study of how a reader engages with an author's work. It is partly about Baker's appreciation for the work of John Updike and partly a self-exploration. Rather than giving a traditional literary analysis, Baker begins the book by stating that he will read no more Updike than he already has up to that point. All of the Updike quotations used are presented as coming from memory alone, and many are inaccurate, with correct versions and Baker's (later) commentary on the inaccuracies.

Critics group together Vox, The Fermata and House of Holes since they are all erotic novels. Vox (1992) consists of an episode of phone sex between two young single people on a pay-per-minute chat line. The book was Baker's first New York Times bestseller and Monica Lewinsky gave a copy to President Bill Clinton when they were having an affair. In Vox, Baker coined the word femalia. The Fermata (1994) also addresses erotic life and fantasy. The protagonist Arno Strine likes to stop time and take off women's clothes. The work proved controversial with critics. It was also a bestseller. House of Holes (2011) is about a fantastical place where all sexual perversions and fetishes are permitted. It is a collection of stories, more or less connected to each other. The novellas are erotic in the sense of Giovanni Boccaccio's Decameron. The titular House of Holes is a fantasy sex resort in which people can engage in absurd sexual practices, such as groin transference and sex with trees. Akin to Alice's Adventures in Wonderland, people enter the House of Holes through such techniques as tumbling through a clothes dryer or through a drinking straw.

Baker is a fervent critic of what he perceives as libraries' unnecessary destruction of paper-based media. He wrote several vehement articles in The New Yorker critical of the San Francisco Public Library for sending thousands of books to a landfill, eliminating card catalogs, and destroying old books and newspapers in favor of microfilm. In 1997, Baker received the San Francisco–based James Madison Freedom of Information Award in recognition of these efforts. In 1999, Baker established a non-profit corporation, the American Newspaper Repository, to rescue old newspapers from destruction by libraries. In 2000, he brought to light the British Library's policy of disposal of non-British newspaper archives, which had been instituted without public announcement and which was halted when a new chief executive was appointed later that year.

In 2001, he published Double Fold: Libraries and the Assault on Paper about preservation, newspapers, and the American library system. An excerpt first appeared in the July 24, 2000, issue of The New Yorker, under the title "Deadline: The Author's Desperate Bid to Save America's Past." The exhaustively researched work (there are 63 pages of endnotes and 18 pages of references in the paperback edition) details Baker's quest to uncover the fate of thousands of books and newspapers that were replaced and often destroyed during the microfilming boom of the 1980s and 1990s.

The 2004 novel Checkpoint is composed of dialogue between two old high school friends, Jay and Ben, who discuss Jay's plans to assassinate President George W. Bush.

Human Smoke: The Beginnings of World War II, the End of Civilization (2008) is a history of World War II that questions the commonly held belief that the Allies wanted to avoid the war at all costs but were forced into action by Hitler's unforgiving actions. It consists largely of official government transcripts and other documents from the time. He suggests that the pacifists were correct in their views.

In March 2008, Baker reviewed John Broughton's Wikipedia – The Missing Manual in the New York Review of Books. In the review, Baker described Wikipedia's beginnings, its culture, and his own editing activities under the username "Wageless". His article "How I fell in love with Wikipedia" was published in The Guardian newspaper in the UK on April 10, 2008.

The Anthologist (2009) is narrated by Paul Chowder, a poet, who is attempting to write an introduction to a poetry anthology. Distracted by problems in his life, he is unable to begin writing, and instead ruminates on poets and poetry throughout history. Also in 2009, Baker reviewed Ken Auletta's Googled: The End of the World as We Know It in the New York Times. Auletta responded by sending a letter to the editor bemoaning what he perceived as the inaccuracy of Baker's review. Here is Baker's rebuttal:

Ken Auletta wrote a thought-provoking book, and I recorded several thoughts provoked. It's a book review, not a bouillon cube. I don't “imply” or “suggest” that the author agrees with the people he quotes. There is indeed an absence of warmth in this chronicle of Google as “dreaded disruptor,” but it's an impartial chilliness, extending in all directions.

In 2014, Baker spent 28 days as a substitute teacher in some Maine public schools as research for his 2016 book Substitute: Going to School With a Thousand Kids. Baker tried to find out "what life in the classroom is really like." He also wrote about the experience for The New York Times Magazine.

Baker wrote a cover story for New York Magazine in January 2021 investigating the COVID-19 lab leak theory and expressing his belief in the theory's plausibility.

== Works ==
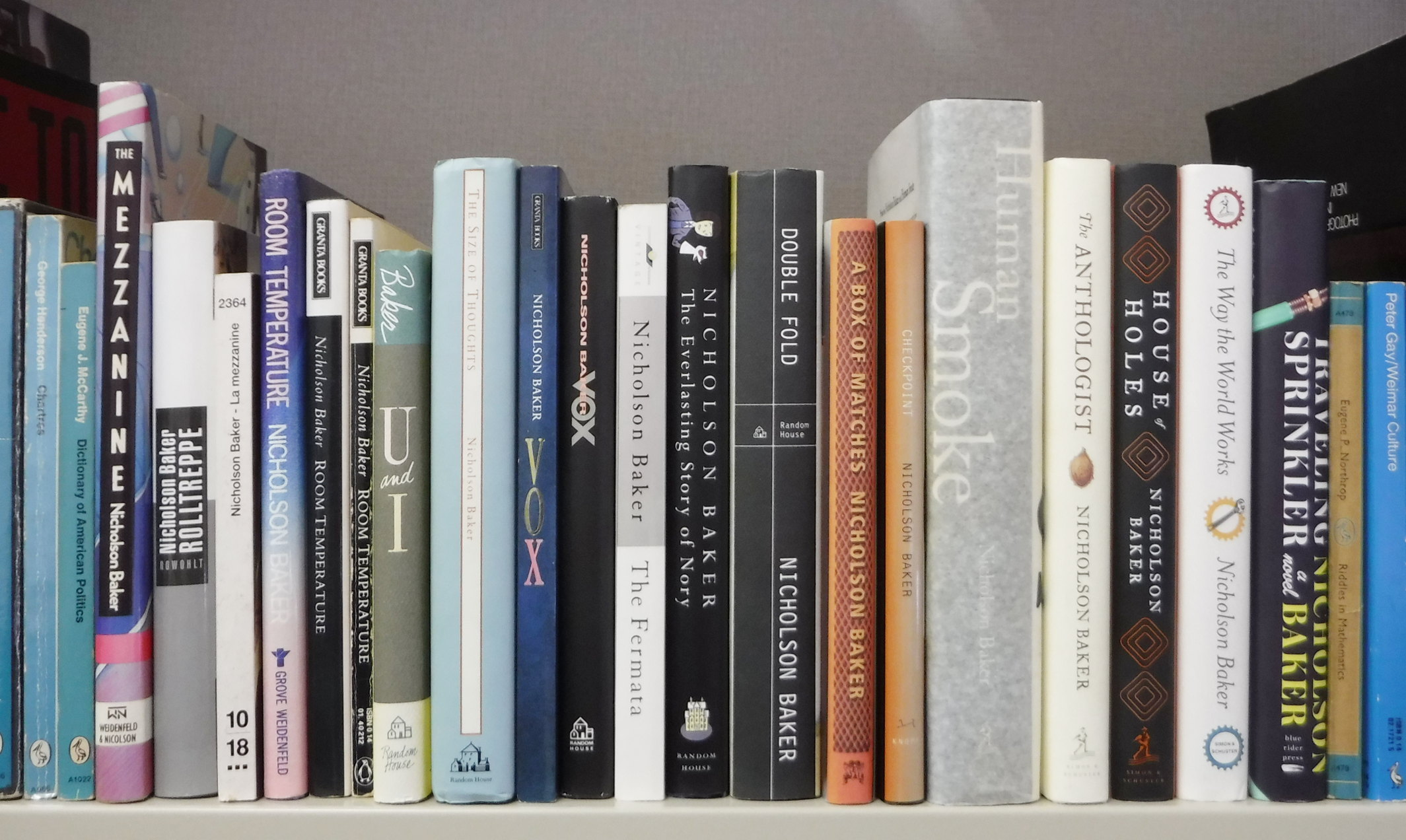
Some books by Nicholson Baker

=== Fiction ===
- The Mezzanine (1988, Weidenfeld & Nicolson; ISBN 1-55584-258-5 / 1990, Vintage; ISBN 0-679-72576-8)
- Room Temperature (1990, Grove Weidenfeld; ISBN 0-8021-1224-2 / 1990, Vintage; ISBN 0-679-73440-6 / 1990, Granta; ISBN 0-14-014212-6 / 1991, Granta; ISBN 0-14-014021-2)
- Vox: A Novel (1992, Random House; ISBN 0-394-58995-5 / 1992, Vintage; ISBN 0-679-74211-5 / 1992, Granta; ISBN 0-14-014057-3)
- The Fermata (1994, Vintage; ISBN 0-679-75933-6)
- The Everlasting Story of Nory (1998, Random House; ISBN 0-679-43933-1 / 1998, Vintage; ISBN 0-679-73440-6)
- A Box of Matches (2003, Random House; ISBN 0-375-50287-4 / 2003, Chatto & Windus; ISBN 0-7011-7402-1)
- Vintage Baker (2004, Vintage; ISBN 9781400078608)
- Checkpoint (2004, Random House; ISBN 1-4000-4400-6)
- The Anthologist (2009, Simon & Schuster; ISBN 1-84737-635-5)
- House of Holes: A Book of Raunch (2011, Simon & Schuster; ISBN 1-4391-8951-X)
- Traveling Sprinkler (2013, Blue Rider Press; ISBN 978-0399160967)

=== Non-fiction ===
- U and I: A True Story (1991, Random House; ISBN 0-394-58994-7 / 1991 Penguin/Granta; ISBN 0-14-014226-6 (hard) / 1992, Penguin/Granta; ISBN 0-14-014040-9 (paper) /1995, Vintage; ISBN 0-679-73575-5 / 1998, Granta; ISBN 1-86207-097-0)
- The Size of Thoughts: Essays and Other Lumber (1996, Random House, ISBN 0-679-43932-3 / 1996, Vintage; ISBN 0-679-77624-9 (paper) / 1996, Chatto & Windus; ISBN 0-7011-6301-1 (hard) / 1997, Vintage; ISBN 0-09-957971-5 (paper))
- Double Fold: Libraries and the Assault on Paper (2001, Random House; ISBN 0-375-50444-3 / 2001, Vintage; ISBN 0-375-72621-7 / 2002, Vintage; ISBN 0-09-942903-9)
- With Margaret Brentano (his wife). The World on Sunday: Graphic Art in Joseph Pulitzer's Newspaper (1898– 1911) (2005, Bulfinch; ISBN 0-8212-6193-2)
- Human Smoke: The Beginnings of World War II, the End of Civilization (2008, Simon & Schuster; ISBN 978-1-4165-6784-4)
- The Way the World Works: Essays (2012, Simon & Schuster; ISBN 978-1-4165-7247-3)
- Substitute: Going to School with a Thousand Kids (2016, Blue Rider Press; ISBN 978-0-399-16098-1)
- Baseless: My Search for Secrets in the Ruins of the Freedom of Information Act (2020, Penguin Press; ISBN 978-0735215757)
- Finding a Likeness: How I Got Somewhat Better at Art (2024, Penguin Press ISBN 978-1984881397)

=== Selected essays and reporting ===
- "The Lab-Leak Hypothesis". New York Magazine. January 4, 2021.
- "Fortress of Tedium: What I Learned as a Substitute Teacher". New York Times. September 7, 2016.
- "Wrong Answer: The Case Against Algebra II". Harper's Magazine. September 2013.
- "A Fourth State of Matter". The New Yorker. Vol. 89, no. 20. July 8, 2013. pp. 64–73.
- "Four Protest Songs". The New Yorker. October 8, 2012. Archived from the original on February 14, 2017.
- "Can the Kindle Really Improve On the Book?". The New Yorker. July 27, 2009. ISSN 0028-792X.
- "Lost Youth". London Review of Books. June 9, 1994.

=== Music ===
- While working on Traveling Sprinkler, Nicholson Baker posted some songs made in the style of protagonist Paul Chowder on YouTube. The ballads combined dance music with protest songs and dealt with foreign policy agenda. Twelve songs were available in a deluxe e-book version of the novel and later on Bandcamp.

== Awards ==
- 1997: James Madison Freedom of Information Award.
- 2001: National Book Critics Circle Award for Double Fold.
- 2014: Baker and his German translator Eike Schönfeld won the Calw Hermann Hesse Prize for the German translation of Double Fold.
- 2018: Baker was awarded a Guggenheim Fellowship.
