= Negative cutting =

Film editing technique

Negative cutting (also known as negative matching and negative conforming) is the process of cutting motion picture negative to match precisely the final edit as specified by the film editor. Original camera negative (OCN) is cut with scissors and joined using a film splicer and film cement. Negative cutting is part of the post-production process and occurs after editing and prior to striking internegatives and release prints. The process of negative cutting has changed little since the beginning of cinema in the early 20th century. In the early 1980s computer software was first used to aid the cutting process. Kodak introduced barcode on motion picture negative in the mid-1990s. This enabled negative cutters to more easily track shots and identify film sections based on keykode.

Toward the late 1990s and early 2000s negative cutting changed due to the advent of digital cinema technologies such as digital intermediate (DI), digital projection and high-definition television. In some countries, due to the high cost of online suites, negative cutting is still used for commercials by reducing footage. Increasingly feature films are bypassing the negative cutting process altogether and are being scanned directly from the uncut rushes.

The existence of digital intermediates (DI) has created a new demand for negative cutters to extract selected takes which are cut from the rushes and re-spliced into new rolls (in edit order) to reduce the volume of footage for scanning.

== Basic ==
After a film shoot, the original camera negative (OCN) is sent to a film laboratory for processing. Two or three 400-foot (120 m) camera rolls are spliced together to create a lab roll approximately 1,200–1,500 ft (370–460 m) long. After developing the lab roll, it is put through a telecine to create a rushes transfer tape. This rushes transfer tape is of lower quality than film and is used for editing purposes only.

The rushes tape is sent to the editor who loads it into an offline edit suite. The lab rolls are sent to the negative cutter for logging and storage.

After the editor finishes the edit it is exported to an offline edit decision list and the EDL is sent to the negative cutter. The negative cutter will translate the timecode in the EDL to edge numbers (keykode) using specially designed negative cutting software to find which shot is needed from the rushes negative.

Traditionally a negative cutter would then fine cut the negative to match the editor's final edit frame accurately. The negative would be spliced together to create rolls less than 2,000 feet (610 m) which would then be sent to the film laboratory to print release prints.

Today most feature films are extracted full takes (as selected takes) and scanned digitally as a digital intermediate. Television series and commercials shot on film follow the same extraction process but are sent for telecine. Each required shot is extracted from the lab roll as a full take and respliced together to create a new selected roll of negative. This reduces the negative required by up to 1/10 of the footage shot, saving considerable time during scanning or telecine. The negative cutter will create a new online EDL replacing the rushes roll timecode with the new selected roll timecode.

In the case of feature films the selected roll and online EDL are sent to a post production facility for scanning as a digital intermediate. For television commercials or series the selected takes and EDL are sent to a post production facility for re-telecine and compiled in an Online Suite for final grading.

== Software ==
There have been a number of dedicated software systems that have been developed for and by negative cutters to manage the process of cutting motion picture negative. A number of individual proprietary software systems have been developed starting in the early 1980s. Stan Sztaba developed a system for World Cinevision Services Inc (New York) in 1983 using Apple II DOS and then ProDOS, this system is still used today. Elliott Gamson of Immaculate Matching (New York) developed a system using MS-DOS. Computamatch was one of the first MS-DOS-based systems developed and is still in use today in several countries.

The first commercially available software product was OSC/R (pronounced "Oscar"), a DOS-based application developed in Toronto, Canada by The Adelaide Works. OSC/R was very widely used and at the time was the only negative cutting software on the market until Adelaide Works ceased operation in 1993. OSC/R is still used today in some negative cutting facilities but has been mostly replaced by newer and more advanced systems. Excalibur was a later Windows 98 based product developed by FilmLab Engineering in Britain. Film Fusion is one of the most recent developments and is a Windows XP and Vista based system developed in Sydney, Australia by Popsoft IT.

== Hardware ==
Negative cutters use various hardware tools such as film synchronizers, re-winders, film splicers, scissors, film cement and film keykode readers. DigiSync, a purpose built keykode reader is used by most negative cutters in conjunction with software for logging the keykode from film. DigiSync was developed by Research In Motion and in 1998 it won a Technical Achievement Academy Award for the design and development of the DigiSync Film Keykode Reader. Research In Motion later moved on to bigger things and invented the BlackBerry Wireless Email Phone and is now a publicly listed company. Other brands of barcode scanners are also in use.

== See also ==
- Film editor
- Digital intermediate
- Film splicer
- Film cement
- Synchronizer (film editing)
- Mo Henry
