= Film preservation =

Historic preservation of motion pictures

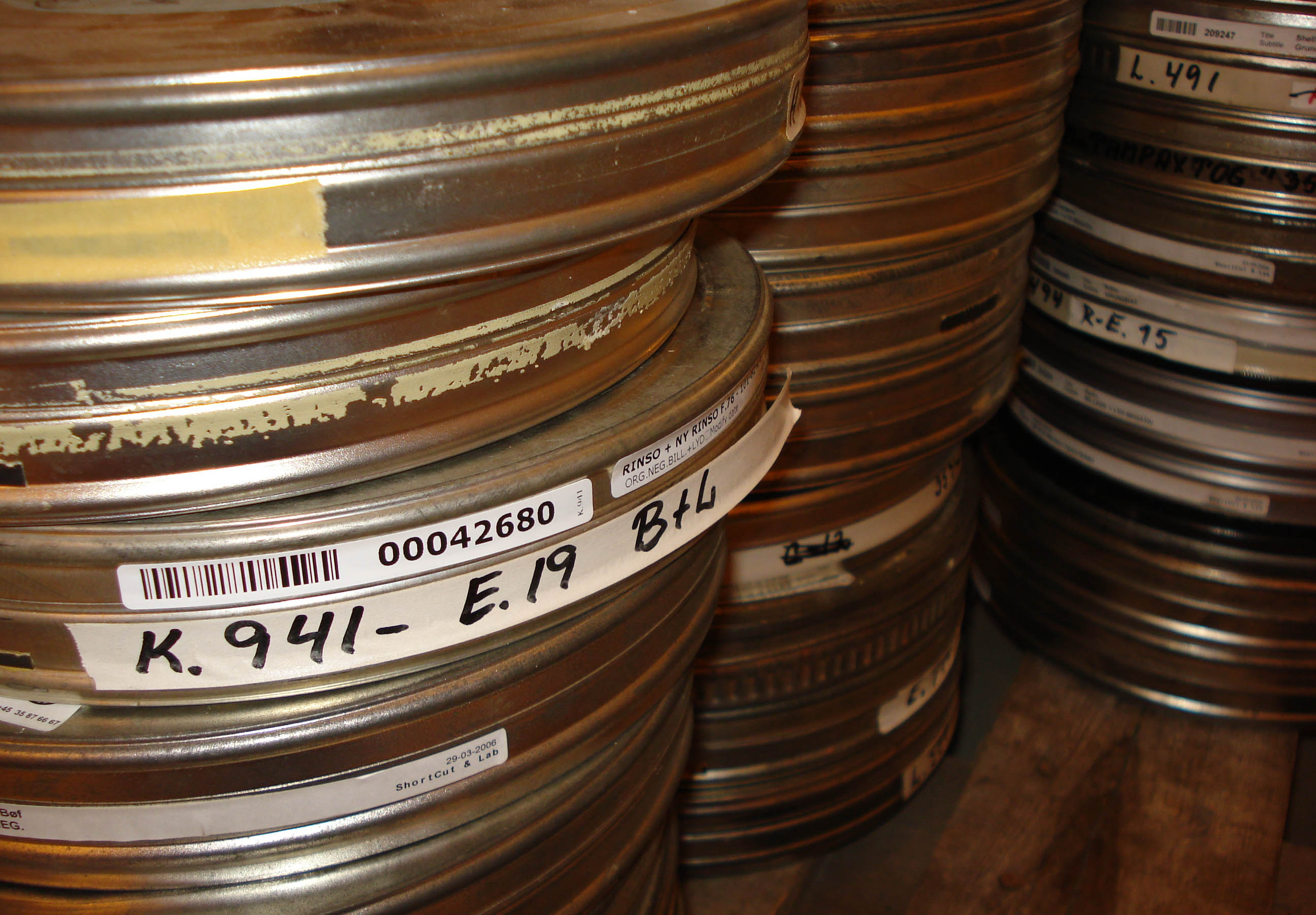
Stacked film cans containing rolls of film

Film preservation, or film restoration, describes a series of ongoing efforts among film historians, archivists, museums, cinematheques, and non-profit organizations to rescue decaying film stock and preserve the images they contain. In the widest sense, preservation assures that a movie will continue to exist in as close to its original form as possible.

For many years the term "preservation" was synonymous with "duplication" of film. The goal of a preservationist was to create a durable copy without any significant loss of quality. In more modern terms, film preservation includes the concepts of handling, duplication, storage, and access. The archivist seeks to protect the film and share its content with the public.

Film preservation is not to be confused with film revisionism, in which long-completed films are modified with the insertion of outtakes or new musical scores, the addition of sound effects, black-and-white film being colorized, older soundtracks converted to Dolby stereo, or minor edits and other cosmetic changes being made.

By the 1980s, it was becoming apparent that the collections of motion picture heritage were at risk of becoming lost. Not only was the preservation of nitrate film an ongoing problem, but it was then discovered that safety film, used as a replacement for the more volatile nitrate stock, was beginning to be affected by a unique form of decay known as "vinegar syndrome", and color film manufactured, in particular, by Eastman Kodak, was found to be at risk of fading. At that time, the best-known solution was to duplicate the original film onto a more secure medium.

A common estimate is that 90 percent of all American silent films made before 1920 and 50 percent of American sound films made before 1950 are lost films.

Although institutional practices of film preservation date back to the 1930s, the field received an official status only in 1980, when UNESCO recognized "moving images" as an integral part of the world's cultural heritage.

== The problem of film decay ==
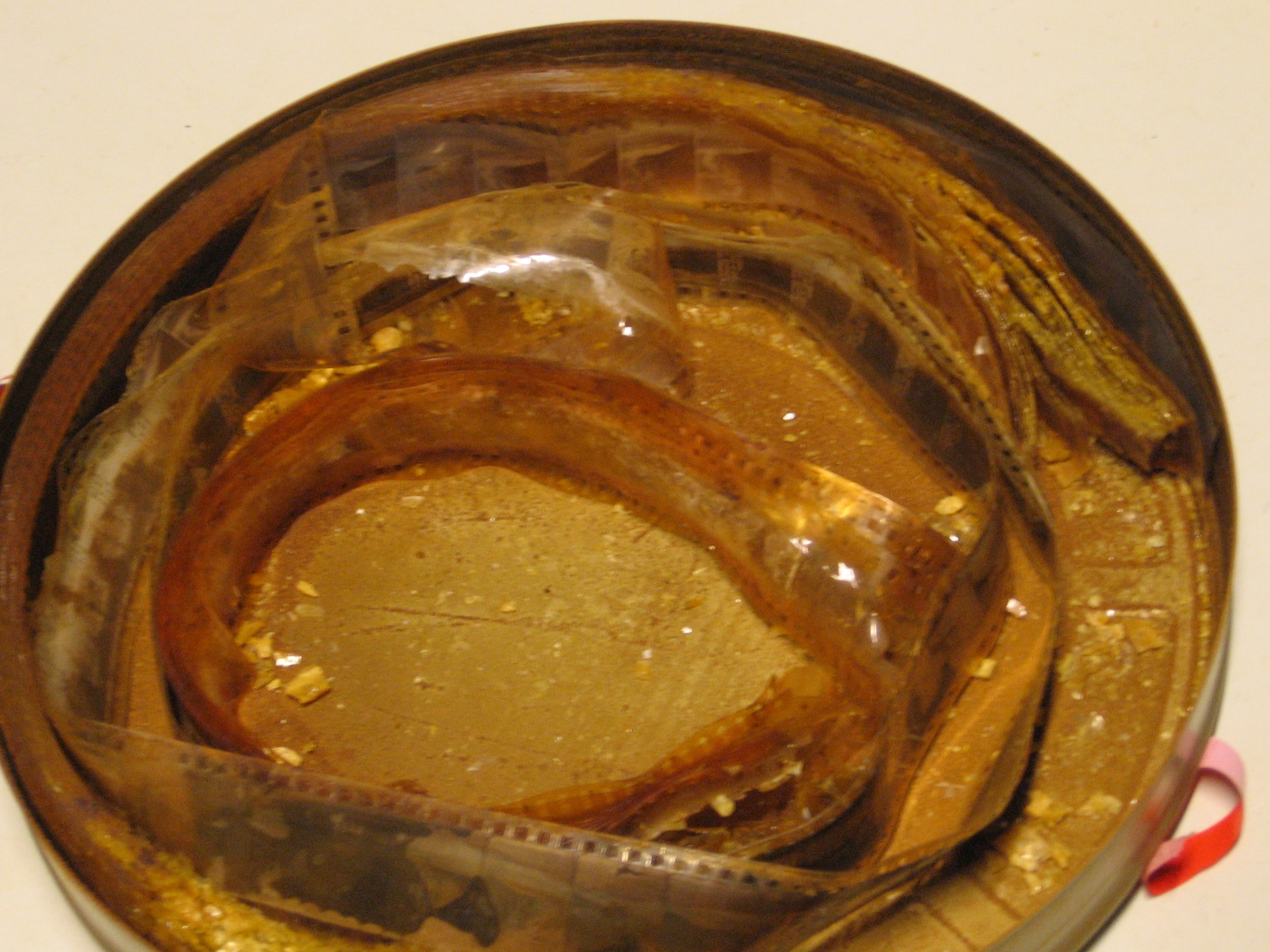
Decayed nitrate film

The great majority of films made in the silent era are now considered to be lost forever. Movies of the first half of the 20th century were filmed on an unstable, highly flammable cellulose nitrate film base, which required careful storage to slow its inevitable process of decomposition over time. Most films made on nitrate stock were not preserved; over the years, their negatives and prints crumbled into powder or dust. Many of them were recycled for their silver content, or destroyed in studio or vault fires. The largest cause, however, was intentional destruction. As film preservationist Robert A. Harris explains, "Most of the early films did not survive because of wholesale junking by the studios. There was no thought of ever saving these films. They simply needed vault space and the materials were expensive to house." Silent films had little or no commercial value after the advent of sound films in the 1930s, and as such, they were not kept. As a result, preserving the now-rare silent films has been proposed as a high priority amongst film historians.

Because of the fragility of film stock, proper preservation of film usually involves storing the original negatives (if they have survived) and prints in climate-controlled facilities. The vast majority of films were not stored in this manner, which resulted in the widespread decay of film stocks.

The problem of film decay is not limited to films made on cellulose nitrate. Film industry researchers and specialists have found that color films (made using processes for Technicolor and its successors) are also decaying at an increasingly rapid rate. A number of well-known films only exist as copies of original film productions or exhibition elements because the originals have decomposed beyond use. Cellulose acetate film, which was the initial replacement for nitrate, has been found to suffer from "vinegar syndrome". Polyester film base, which replaced acetate, also suffers from fading colors.

Storage at carefully controlled low temperatures and low humidity can inhibit both color fading and the onset of vinegar syndrome. However, once degradation begins to occur, the chemical reactions involved will promote further deterioration. "There is no indication that we will ever find a way to arrest decomposition once it has started. All we can do is inhibit it," says the director of the AMIA (Association of Moving Image Archivists) board, Leo Enticknap.

=== Film decay as an art form ===
External videos
- Decasia movie trailer, Icarus Films, shows decaying film

In 1991, filmmaker and former deputy director of the Eye Filmmuseum in Amsterdam, Peter Delpeut, made the film Lyrical Nitrate, with decaying films from the Desmet Collection.

In 2002, filmmaker Bill Morrison produced Decasia, a film solely based on fragments of old unrestored nitrate-based films in various states of decay and disrepair, providing a somewhat eerie aesthetic to the film. The film was created to accompany a symphony of the same name, composed by Michael Gordon and performed by his orchestra. The footage used was from old newsreel and archive film and was obtained by Morrison from several sources, such as the George Eastman House, the archives of the Museum of Modern Art, and the Fox Movietone News film archives at the University of South Carolina.

== Preservation through careful storage ==
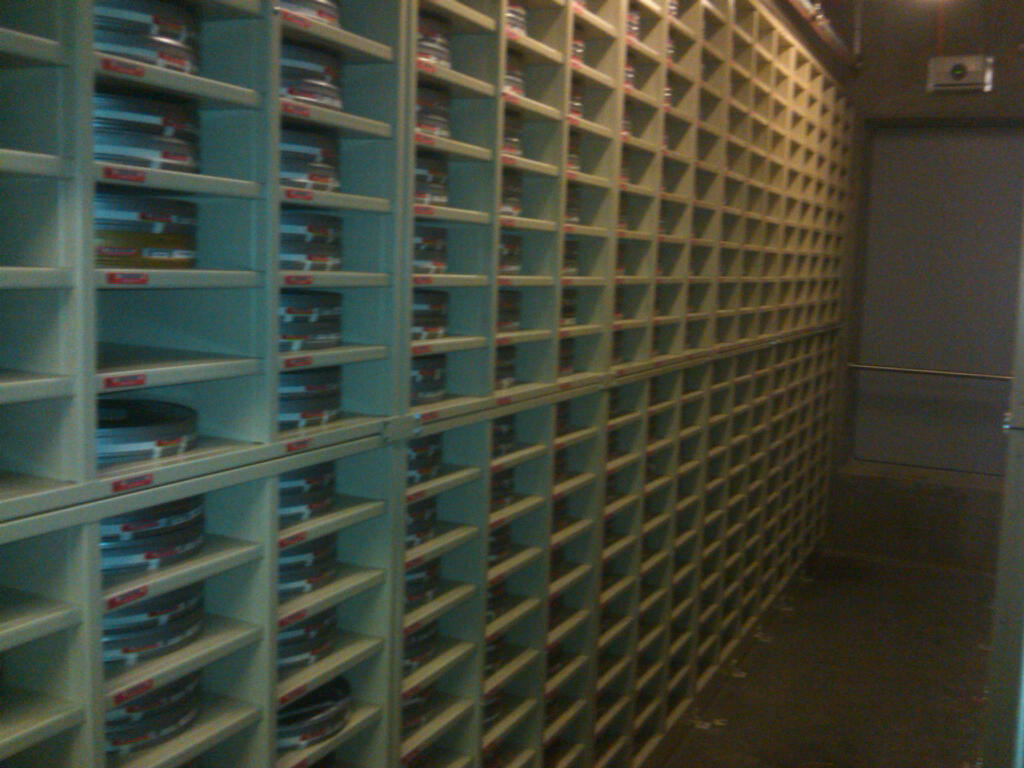
Packard Humanities Institute, Santa Clarita, Nitrate film Film Vault

The preservation of film usually refers to physical storage of the film in a climate-controlled vault, and sometimes to the actual repair and copying of the film element. Preservation is different from restoration, as restoration is the act of returning the film to a version most faithful to its initial release to the public and often involves combining various fragments of film elements.

Film is best preserved by proper protection from external forces while in storage along with being under controlled temperatures. For most film materials, the Image Permanence Institute finds that storing film media in frozen temperatures, with relative humidity (RH) between 30% and 50%, greatly extends its useful life. These measures inhibit deterioration better than any other methods and are a cheaper solution than replicating deteriorating films.

== Preparing a film for preservation and restoration ==
In most cases, when a film is chosen for preservation or restoration work, new prints are created from the original camera negative or from a composite restoration negative, which can be made from a combination of elements for general screening. It is therefore particularly important to keep camera negatives or digital masters under safe storage conditions.

The original camera negative is the remaining, edited, film negative that passed through the camera on the set. This original camera negative may, or may not, remain in original release form, depending upon number of subsequent re-releases after the initial release for theatrical exhibition. Restorers sometimes create a composite negative (or composite dupe) by recombining duplicated sections of the best remaining material, sometimes on "a shot-to-shot, frame-by-frame basis" to approximate the original configuration of the original camera negative at some time in the film's release cycle.

In traditional photochemical restorations, image polarity considerations must be observed when recombining surviving materials and the final, lowest generation restoration master may be either a duplicate negative or a fine grain master positive. Preservation elements, such as fine-grain master positives and duplicate printing negatives, are generated from this restoration master element to make both duplication masters and access projection prints available for future generations.

== Choosing an archival medium ==
=== Film as an archival medium ===
Film preservationists would prefer that the film images, whether restored through photochemical or digital processes, be eventually transferred to other film stock, because no digital media exists that has proven truly archival because of rapidly evolving and shifting data formats, while a well-developed and stored, modern film print can last upwards of 100 years.

While some in the archival community feel that conversion from film to a digital image results in a loss of quality that can make it more difficult to create a high-quality print based upon the digital image, digital imaging technology has become increasingly advanced to the point where 8K scanners can capture the full resolution of images filmed at as high as 65 mm. 70 mm IMAX film has a theoretical resolution of 18K, the highest possible resolution given the sensor.

Of course, having an intermediate digital stage, followed by forming a new film master by lasering the digital results onto new film stock does represent an extra generation. So would an intermediate film master that was restored frame-by-frame by hand. The choice of film vs. digital restoration will be driven by the amount, if any, of restoration required, the taste and skill set of the restorer, and the economics of film restoration vs. digital restoration.

=== Digital as an archival medium ===
As of 2014, digital scanners can capture images as large as 65 mm in full resolution. That is the typical image size on a traditional (as opposed to the IMAX process) 70 mm film which used a portion of the film surface for its multitrack magnetic sound stripe. The cost of a 70 mm print of a two and a half hour film as of 2012 ran upwards of $170,000; while a hard disk capable of storing such a movie typically cost a few hundred dollars, with an archival optical disk even less. The problem of having to transfer the data as new generations of equipment come along will continue, however, until true archival standards are put in place.

== Digital film preservation ==
In the context of film preservation, the term "digital preservation" highlights the use of digital technology for the transfer of films from 8 mm to 70 mm in size to digital carriers, as well as all practices for ensuring the longevity and access to digitized or digitally born film materials. On purely technical and practical terms, digital film preservation stands for a domain specific subset of digital curation practices.

The aesthetic and ethical implications of the use of digital technology for film preservation are major subjects of debate. For instance, the senior curator of George Eastman House Paolo Cherchi Usai has decried the shift from analogue to digital preservation of film as ethically unacceptable, arguing, on philosophical terms, that the medium of film is an essential ontological precondition for the existence of cinema. In 2009, the senior curator of EYE Film Institute Netherlands Giovanna Fossati has discussed the use of digital technologies for the restoration and preservation of film in a more optimistic way as a form of remediation of the cinematic medium, and has positively reflected on digital technologies' ability to broaden restoration possibilities, improve quality, and reduce costs. According to the cinema scholar Leo Enticknap, the views held by Usai and Fossati could be seen as representative of the two poles of the digital debate in film preservation. It should be kept in mind, however, that both Usai and Fossati's arguments are highly complex and nuanced, and likewise, the debate about the utility of digital technologies in film preservation is complex and continually evolving.

== Advancements ==
In 1935, New York's Museum of Modern Art began one of the earliest institutional attempts to collect and preserve motion pictures, obtaining original negatives of the Biograph and Edison companies and the world's largest collection of D. W. Griffith films. The following year, Henri Langlois founded the Cinémathèque Française in Paris, which would become the world's largest international film collection.

For thousands of early silent films stored in the Library of Congress, mostly between 1894 and 1912, the only existing copies were printed on rolls of paper submitted as copyright registrations. For these, an optical printer was used to copy these images onto safety film stock, a project that began in 1947 and continues today. The Library hosts the National Film Preservation Board, whose National Film Registry annually selects 25 U.S. films "showcasing the range and diversity of American film heritage". The George Eastman House International Museum of Photography and Film was chartered in 1947 to collect, preserve and present the history of photography and film, and in 1996 opened the Louis B. Mayer Conservation Center, one of only four film conservation centers in the United States. The American Film Institute was founded in 1967 to train the next generation of filmmakers and preserve the American film heritage. Its collection now includes over 27,500 titles.

In 1978, Dawson City, Yukon Territory, Canada, a construction excavation inadvertently found a forgotten collection of more than 500 discarded films from the early 20th century that were buried in and preserved in the permafrost. This fortunate discovery was shared and moved to the United States' Library of Congress and Library and Archives Canada for transfer to safety stock and archiving. However, to move such highly flammable material such a distance ultimately required assistance from the Canadian Armed Forces to make the delivery to Ottawa. The story of this discovery as well as excerpts of these films can be seen in the 2016 documentary film, Dawson City: Frozen Time.

Another high-profile restoration by staff at the British Film Institute's National Film and Television Archive is the Mitchell and Kenyon collection, which consists almost entirely of actuality films commissioned by traveling fairground operators for showing at local fairgrounds or other venues across the UK in the early part of the twentieth century. The collection was stored for many decades in two large barrels following the winding-up of the firm, and was discovered in Blackburn in the early 1990s. The restored films now offer a unique social record of early 20th-century British life.

Individual preservationists who have contributed to the cause include Robert A. Harris and James Katz (Lawrence of Arabia, My Fair Lady, and several Alfred Hitchcock films), Michael Thau (Superman), and Kevin Brownlow (Intolerance and Napoleon). Other organizations, such as the UCLA Film and Television Archive, have also preserved and restored films; a major part of UCLA's work includes such projects as Becky Sharp and select Paramount/Famous Studios and Warner Bros. cartoons whose credits were once altered due to rights taken over by different entities.

== Studio efforts ==
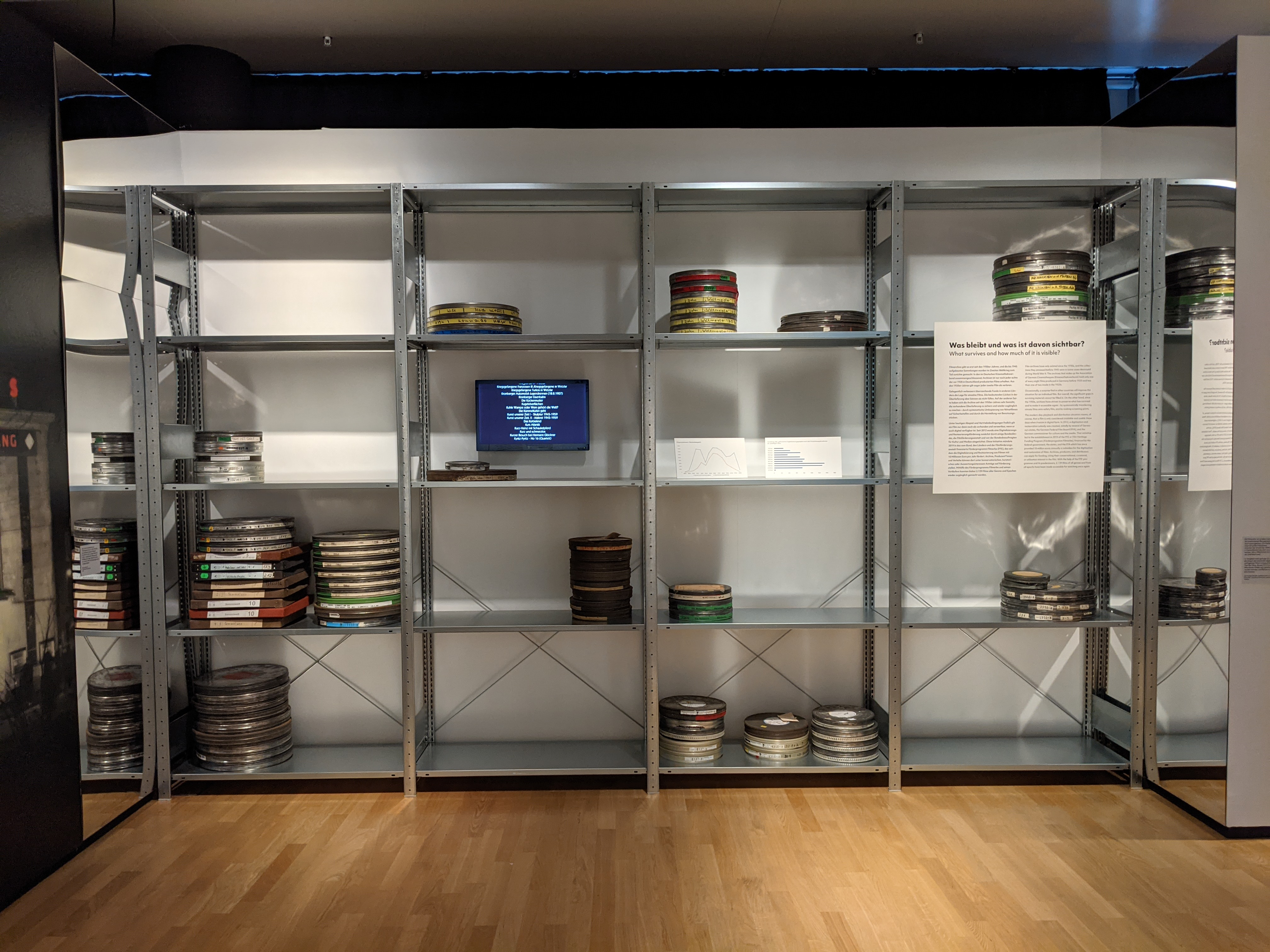
Simulation of a film archive: the shelves have been left almost empty to help visitors better visualize the gap between the number of surviving films and the number of films actually made.

In 1926 Will Hays asked for film studios to preserve their films by storing them at 40 degrees at low humidity in an Eastman Kodak process, so that "schoolboys in the year 3,000 and 4,000 A.D. may learn about us".

Beginning in the 1970s, Metro-Goldwyn-Mayer, aware that the original negatives to many of its Golden Age films had been destroyed in a fire, began a preservation program to restore and preserve all of its films by using whatever negatives survived, or, in many cases, the next best available elements (whether it be a fine-grain master positive or mint archival print). From the onset, it was determined that if some films had to be preserved, then it would have to be all of them. In 1986, when Ted Turner acquired MGM's library (which by then had included Warner Bros.' pre-1950, (Note: Warner Bros. retained a pair of features from 1949 that they merely distributed, and all short subjects released on or after September 1, 1948, in addition to all cartoons released in August 1948.) MGM's pre-May 1986, and a majority of the RKO Radio Pictures catalogs), he vowed to continue the preservation work MGM had started. Warner Bros. Discovery, the current owner of Turner Entertainment, continues this work today.

The cause for film preservation came to the forefront in the 1980s and early 1990s when such famous and influential film directors as Steven Spielberg and Martin Scorsese contributed to the cause. Spielberg became interested in film preservation when he went to view the master of his film Jaws, only to find that it had badly decomposed and deteriorated—a mere fifteen years after it had been filmed. Scorsese drew attention to the film industry's use of color-fading film stock through his use of black-and-white film stock in his 1980 film Raging Bull. His film, Hugo included a key scene in which many of film pioneer Georges Méliès' silent films are melted down and the raw material recycled as shoes; this was seen by many movie critics as "a passionate brief for film preservation wrapped in a fanciful tale of childhood intrigue and adventure".

Scorsese's concern about the need to save motion pictures of the past led him to create The Film Foundation, a non-profit organization dedicated to film preservation, in 1990. He was joined in this effort by fellow film makers who served on the foundation's board of directors—Woody Allen, Robert Altman, Francis Ford Coppola, Clint Eastwood, Stanley Kubrick, George Lucas, Sydney Pollack, Robert Redford, and Steven Spielberg. In 2006, Paul Thomas Anderson, Wes Anderson, Curtis Hanson, Peter Jackson, Ang Lee, and Alexander Payne were added to the board of directors of The Film Foundation, which is aligned with the Directors Guild of America.

By working in partnership with the leading film archives and studios, The Film Foundation has saved nearly 600 films, often restoring them to pristine condition. In many cases, original footage that had been excised—or censored by the Production Code in the U.S.—from the original negative, has been reinstated. In addition to the preservation, restoration, and presentation of classic cinema, the foundation teaches young people about film language and history through The Story of Movies, an educational program claimed to be "used by over 100,000 educators nationwide".

In the age of high-definition television and streaming, film preservation and restoration has taken on commercial importance as well. Meanwhile, audiences' appetite for new content and appreciation for 4K restorations of classic films has meant that previously unrestored films have proven their utility with long-term revenue. Thus media companies have a financial incentive to archive and preserve their complete library of films.

== Obstacles in restoration ==
The process of restoration is expensive due to physical damage incurred on older films, and restoration efforts often require multiple copies or fragments which contain better-quality versions of certain scenes or soundtracks. As of 2020, Martin Scorsese's non-profit The Film Foundation, dedicated to film preservation, estimates the average cost of photochemical restoration of a color feature with sound to be $80,000 to $450,000, with digital 2K or 4K restoration being "several hundred thousand dollars".

Digitization and restoration are different processes (and different phenomena). Digitization is simply transferring a copy to a digital format with general corrections. Restoration, on the other hand, involves using as many copies as possible, carrying out more detailed and intensive processes to make improvements and create a new version. As many copies as possible should be used in restoration, and ideally all copies should be available.

When films are restored, older frame format films are cropped from the top and/or bottom to make them compatible with modern television screens. Films that have been excessively cropped from the top and/or bottom can be found all over the world. Sometimes, it becomes apparent that older images have been cropped from the right or left for the televisions of that era. According to internationally accepted general rules, original copies of films to be edited (or cropped) must be preserved. It is evident that the vast majority of restored and released films have been cropped only from the bottom, only from the top, or from both directions. Unfortunately, there are even instances where nearly half of the image has been destroyed. This contradicts the purpose of film preservation.

== Education ==
The practice of film preservation is more craft than science. Until the early 1990s there were no dedicated academic programs in film preservation. Practitioners had often entered the field through related education (e.g. library or archival science), related technical experience (e.g. film lab work), or driven by sheer passion for working with film.

In the last two decades universities globally began offering graduate degrees in film preservation and film archiving, which are often taught conjointly (the latter focusing more on skills related to the description, cataloguing, indexing and broadly speaking management of film and media collections).

The recent years rapid incursion of digital technologies in the field has somewhat redefined the vocational scope of film preservation. In response, the majority of graduate programs in film preservation have begun offering courses on digital film preservation and digital film and media collection management.

Some established graduate programs in the field are:

- MA in Film Archiving, University of East Anglia
- Film Preservation Certificate, Selznick School of Film Preservation
- MA in Film and Media Preservation, Selznick School of Film Preservation offered jointly with the University of Rochester
- MA in Moving Image Archiving and Preservation, New York University, Tisch School of the Arts
- MA in Heritage Studies: Preservation and Presentation of the Moving Image, University of Amsterdam no longer available
- Graduate Certificate in Audiovisual Archiving, Charles Sturt University, Australia
- MA in Moving Image Archive Studies, UCLA no longer available
- MA in Film Preservation, Ryerson University, Canada offered since 2013 as specialization in the graduate program of Film + Photography Preservation and Collection Management

== See also ==
- 3D LUT
- ABS-CBN Film Restoration Project
- Academy Film Archive
- Conservation and restoration of film
- Digital cinematography
- Digital intermediate
- Film recorder
- Film-out
- Inpainting
- List of film formats
- List of national archives
- Media Preservation Foundation
- Museum of the Moving Image (New York City)
- National Archives and Records Administration - US
- Orphan film
- Post-production
- Preservation (library and archive)
- Preservation of magnetic audiotape
- Separation masters
- Virtual telecine
