= Harold Brown (film preservationist) =

British film preservationist (1919–2008)

Harold Godart Brown
- Born: August 15, 1919; Walthamstow, UK
- Died: November 14, 2008 (aged 89); Milton Keynes, UK
- Occupation: Film Archivist
- Years active: 1935 to 2008

Harold Godart Brown (15 August 1919 – 14 November 2008) was the first head of film preservation at the British Film Institute's archive. He was appointed by the archive's founding curator, Ernest Lindgren, upon its creation in 1935, and remained in the post until his retirement in 1984.

== Biography ==
Born in Walthamstow, the son of a maker of nautical instruments, Brown joined the British Film Institute (BFI) as an office assistant aged 15 in 1935, two years after it was established. Formally appointed as the BFI's first film preservation officer in 1951, he was a largely self-taught archivist.

In his role at the BFI, Brown made a major contribution to the science of film preservation. He was possibly the first archivist to research systematically the decomposition process of nitrate film, and consequently to show that it can be inhibited by storage in a cool and dry atmosphere. Brown is credited with having invented the term vinegar syndrome to describe the deacetylation of cellulose acetate film (safety film). He designed and built specialist step-printers to enable the preservation copying of shrunken and otherwise damaged originals. He was an active member of FIAF's Technical Commission, in which capacity he wrote and contributed to technical manuals that film archivists still consider standard reference works. Retiring in 1984, he was the longest serving employee of the BFI.

In retirement, Brown was a prominent volunteer with the Projected Picture Trust, restoring and operating historical projectors at a museum in Bletchley Park.

== See also ==
- Film preservation
- British Film Institute
- BFI National Archive
- Fédération Internationale des Archives du Film
