= Cel =

Transparent sheet used in animation

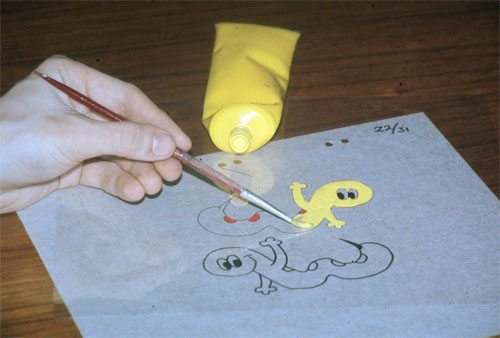
Painting with acrylic paint on the reverse side of an already inked cel.

A cel, short for celluloid, is a transparent sheet on which objects are drawn or painted for traditional, classical, hand-drawn animation. Actual celluloid (consisting of cellulose nitrate and camphor) was used during the first half of the 20th century. Since it was flammable and dimensionally unstable, celluloid was largely replaced by cellulose acetate (cellulose diacetate and cellulose triacetate) and polyester. With the advent of computer-assisted animation production (also known as digital ink and paint), the use of cels has become obsolete in major productions. Walt Disney Animation Studios stopped using cels in 1990, when Computer Animation Production System (CAPS) replaced this element in their animation process. In the next decade and a half, other animation studios phased cels out as well in favor of digital ink and paint.

== Technique ==
The trailer for Snow White and the Seven Dwarfs shows animation cels and their backgrounds being handled.

Generally, the characters are drawn and painted on cels and laid over a static background painting or drawing. This reduces the number of times an image has to be redrawn and enables studios to split up the production process to different specialised teams. Using this assembly line way to animate has made it possible to produce films much more cost-effectively. The invention of the technique is generally attributed to Earl Hurd, who patented the process in 1914.

The outline of the images are drawn on the front of the cel while colors are painted on the back to eliminate brushstrokes. Traditionally, the outlines were hand-inked, but since the 1960s they are almost exclusively xerographed on. Another important breakthrough in cel animation was the development of the Animation Photo Transfer Process, first seen in The Black Cauldron, released in 1985.

Typically, an animated feature would require over 100,000 hand-painted cels.

== Collector's items ==
Production cels were sometimes sold after the animation process was completed. More popular shows and movies commanded higher prices for the cels, with some selling for thousands of dollars.

Some cels are not used for actual production work, but may be a "special" or "limited edition" version of the artwork, sometimes even printed ("serigraphed") instead of hand-painted. These normally do not fetch as high a price as original "under-the-camera" cels, which are true collector's items. Some unique cels have fetched record prices at art auctions. For example, a large "pan" cel depicting numerous characters from the finale of Who Framed Roger Rabbit sold for $50,600 at Sotheby's in 1989, including its original background.

Disney Stores sold production cels from The Little Mermaid (their last film to use cels) at prices from $2,500 to $3,500, without the original backgrounds. Screen printed "sericels" (serigraphic cels) from the same film were $250, with edition sizes of 2,500–5,000 pieces.

== See also ==
- Cel shading, a non-photorealistic rendering method of computer graphics to give it a feeling that it is drawn on a cel
- Traditional animation: information about the process of using cels to produce animation and has a section about cels and xerography, APT, etc.
