= Cigarette filter =

Filter in cigarettes that reduce nicotine, tar and carbon monoxide

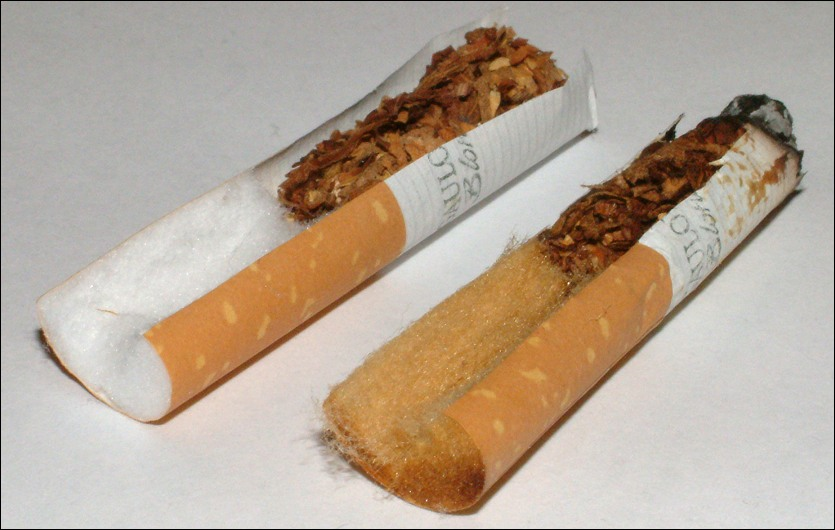
Filters in a new and used cigarette. Filters were designed to turn brown with use to give the illusion that they were effective.

Components of a filter cigarette: 1. Cigarette filter; 2. Imitation cork tip paper; 3. Cigarette paper; 4. Tobacco

A cigarette filter, also known as a filter tip, is a component of a cigarette, along with tobacco, cigarette paper, capsules and adhesives. Modern filters were introduced in the early 1950s.

Filters may be made from plastic cellulose acetate fiber, paper or activated charcoal (either as a cavity filter or embedded into the plastic cellulose acetate fibers). Macroporous phenol-formaldehyde resins and asbestos have also been used. The plastic cellulose acetate filter and paper modify the particulate smoke phase by particle retention (filtration), and finely divided carbon modifies the gaseous phase (adsorption).

Filters are intended to reduce the harm caused by smoking by reducing harmful chemicals inhaled by smokers. While laboratory tests show a reduction of tar and nicotine in cigarette smoke, filters are ineffective at removing gases of low molecular weight, such as carbon monoxide. Most of these measured reductions occur only when the cigarette is smoked on a smoking machine; when smoked by a human, the compounds are delivered into the lungs regardless of whether a filter is used.

Most factory-made cigarettes are equipped with a filter; users who roll their own can buy them from a tobacconist.

In North America, the common name for the remains of a cigarette after smoking is a cigarette butt. In Britain, it is also called a dog-end or a fag end.

== History ==
In 1925, Hungarian inventor Boris Aivaz patented the process of making a cigarette filter from crepe paper.

From 1935, Molins Machine Co Ltd a British company began to develop a machine that made cigarettes incorporating the tipped filter. It was considered a specialty item until 1954, when manufacturers introduced the machine more broadly, following a spate of announcements from doctors and researchers concerning a possible link between lung diseases and smoking. Since filtered cigarettes were considered safer, by the 1960s, they dominated the market. Production of filter cigarettes rose from 0.5 percent in 1950 to 87.7 percent by 1975.

Between the 1930s and the 1950s, most cigarettes were 70 millimetres (2 3/4 in) long. In the 1980s, many were 80, 85, 100, or 120 millimetres (3 1/8, 3 3/8, 3 7/8, or 4 3/4 in) long.

Cigarettes filters were originally made of cork and used to prevent tobacco flakes from getting on the smoker's tongue. Many are still patterned to look like cork.

== Manufacture ==
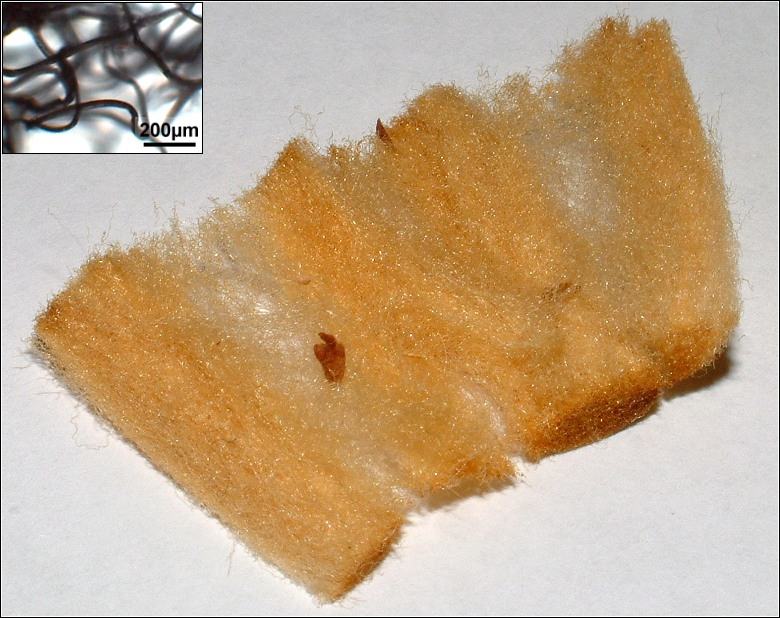
Spent cigarette filter

Cigarette filters are usually made from plastic cellulose acetate fibre, but sometimes also from paper or activated charcoal (either as a cavity filter or embedded into the cellulose acetate). Glycerol triacetate may be used as a softener.

The tip paper may be coated with polyvinyl alcohol.

=== Colour change ===
The tobacco industry determined that the illusion of filtration was more important than filtration itself. The pH of the cellulose acetate used is modified, so that its colour becomes darker when exposed to smoke (this was invented in 1953 by Claude Teague, working for R. J. Reynolds Tobacco Company). The industry wanted filters to be seen as effective for marketing reasons, despite not making smoking any less unhealthy. Teague said that:

The cigarette smoking public attaches great significance to visual examination of the filter material in filter tip cigarettes after smoking the cigarettes. A before and after smoking visual comparison is usually made and if the filter tip material, after smoking, is darkened, the tip is automatically judged to be effective. While the use of such colour change material would probably have little or no effect on the actual effectiveness of the filter tip material, the advertising and sales advantages are obvious.

== Health risks ==
Public-health researchers have argued that cellulose acetate cigarette filters do not protect people who smoke from smoking-related harms and function primarily as a marketing tool. In 2025, UK researchers publicly urged a ban on cigarette filters, arguing that filters do not reduce toxicant exposure and contribute to plastic pollution.

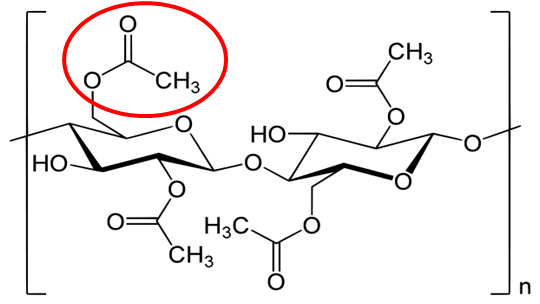
Structure formula of cellulose diacetate with one of the acetate groups on the cellulose backbone shown by the red circle

== Waste ==
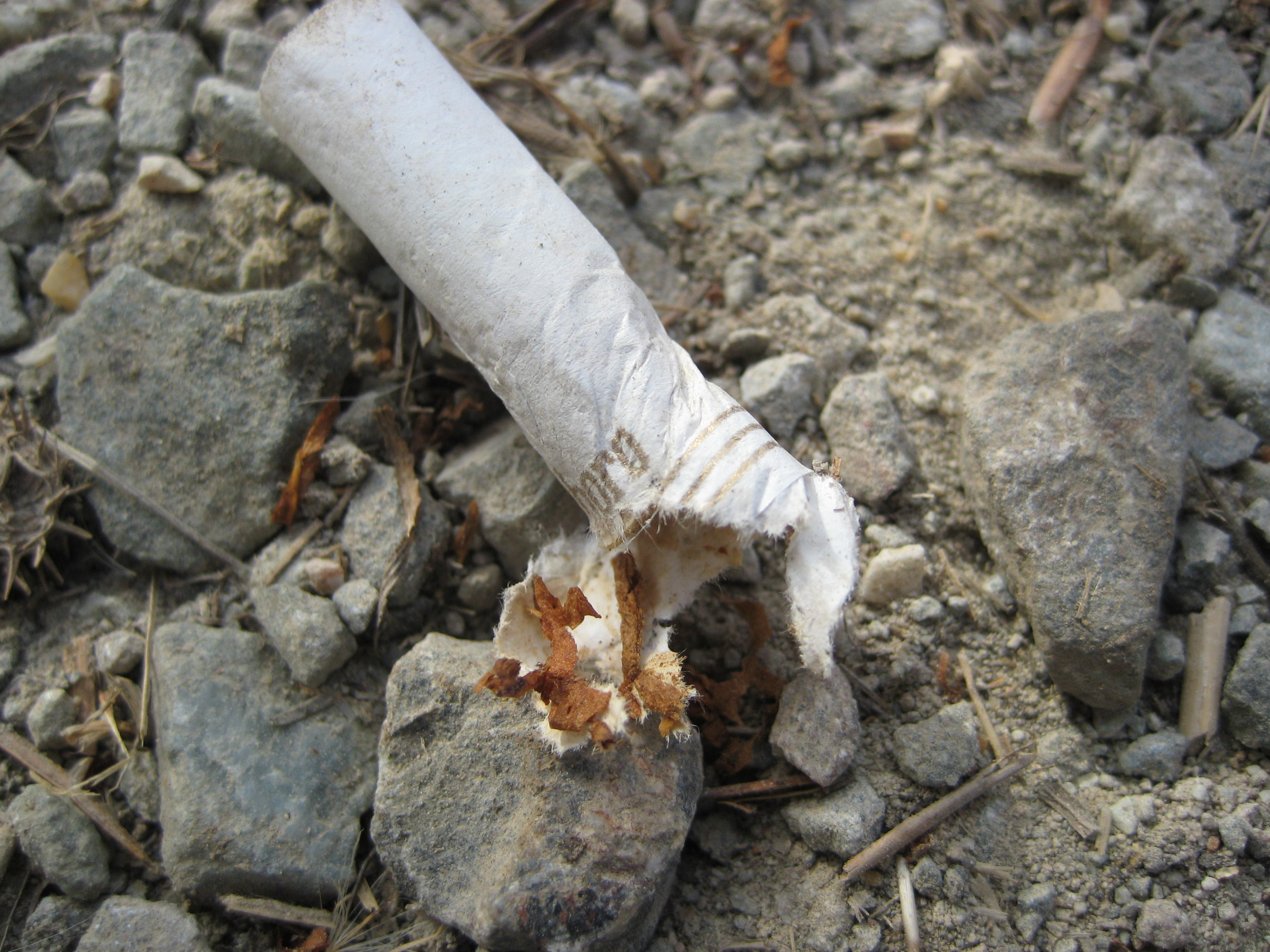
A cigarette butt littered on the ground

Cigarette butts are the most littered anthropogenic (man-made) waste item in the world. Approximately 5.6 trillion cigarettes are smoked every year worldwide. Of these, it is estimated that 4.5 trillion cigarette butts become litter every year. The plastic cellulose acetate in cigarette butts biodegrades gradually, passing through the stage of microplastics. The breakdown of discarded cigarette butts is highly dependent upon environmental conditions. A 2021 review article cites an experiment where 45–50% of cellulose acetate mass was fully degraded to CO_{2} after 55 days of controlled composting and another where negligible degradation took place after 12 weeks in pilot-scale compost. Peer-reviewed studies have quantified microfiber shedding from cigarette filters in water over time, reporting average releases of ~5.78–92.43 microfiber items per gram of filter after 1–60 days, and estimating that cigarette filters may release tens of trillions of microfibers annually into aquatic environments. A 2025 laboratory study reported that cigarette butts in water can shed cellulose acetate microfibers immediately upon immersion and continue shedding over time; the authors quantified release under different agitation conditions over 10 days.

During the act of smoking, plastic cellulose acetate fibers and tipping paper absorb a wide range of chemicals that are present in tobacco smoke. After cigarette butts are discarded, they can leach toxins including nicotine, arsenic, polycyclic aromatic hydrocarbons and heavy metals into the environment. Smoked cigarette butts and cigarette tobacco in butts have been shown to be toxic to water organisms such as the marine topsmelt (Atherinops affinis) and the freshwater fathead minnow (Pimephales promelas). Moreover, cigarette filters enriched in toxic substances that enter environmental waterbodies have been shown to be increasingly colonized by potentially pathogenic bacteria including those displaying antibiotic resistance, as these are particularly well adapted to the adverse conditions on the filters. Research indicates that switching to paper filters alone would not reduce coastal filter pollution.

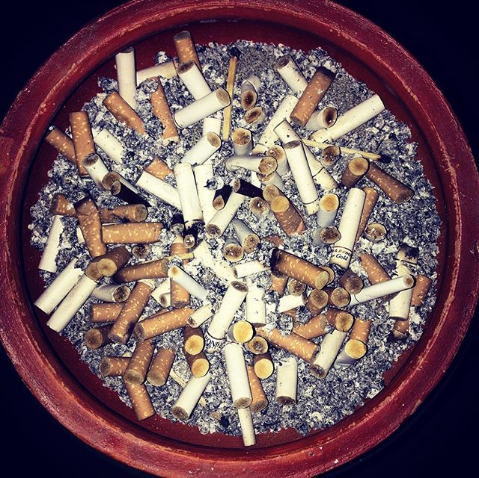
Ashtray full of cigarette butts

Many governments and local authorities have imposed stiff penalties for littering of cigarette filters; for example Washington State imposes a penalty of $1,025 for littering cigarette filters. Another option is developing better biodegradable filters. Much of this work relies heavily on the research about the secondary mechanism for photodegradation. However, making a product biodegradable means making it vulnerable to humidity and heat, which does not suit filters made for hot and humid smoke. The next option is using cigarette packs with a compartment for discarded cigarette butts, implementing monetary deposits on filters, increasing the availability of cigarette receptacles, and expanding public education. Others have suggested banning the sale of filtered cigarettes altogether on the basis of their adverse environmental impact.

Recent research has been put into finding ways to use the filter waste in order to develop other products. One research group in South Korea have developed a one-step process that converts the cellulose acetate in discarded cigarette filters into a high-performing supercapacitor electrode material. These materials have demonstrated superior performance as compared to commercially available carbon, graphene and carbon nanotubes.

Another group of researchers has proposed adding tablets of food grade acid inside the filters. Once wet enough the tablets would release acid that accelerates degradation to around two weeks, instead of using cellulose triacetate, besides which cigarette smoke is quite acidic.

Some jurisdictions have introduced extended producer responsibility (EPR) requirements specifically for tobacco products with filters and filters sold for use with tobacco products aiming to reduce cigarette-butt littering and finance costs of collection and cleanup.

Some birds collect and add cigarette butts to their nests. It has been shown to reduce the number of parasites and improve the health of the nestlings.

== Activated charcoal filtration ==
Cigarette filter can incorporate an activated charcoal filtration system. Instead of acetate or cardboard filters, it consists of two ceramic caps on either sides containing activated charcoal, which reduces tar and other toxins in the smoke.

== See also ==
- Cigarette butt
- Cigarette holder
- List of additives in cigarettes
- Nicotine marketing
- Tobacco smoking
