= Diacetate =

Diacetate may refer to:

- A chemical compound, (CH_{3}COO)_{2}R or R(OAc)_{2}, that is a double acetate ester
  - Cellulose diacetate, sometimes simply called diacetate, poly-(Glc(OAc)_{2})
- A chemical compound, R(OCOCH_{3})_{2}, that contains two acetoxy groups, –OAc or −OCOCH_{3}
- The anion of sodium diacetate, consisting of an acetate ion hydrogen-bonded to acetic acid, (CH_{3}COO)_{2}H^{−}
- The anion of acetoacetic acid, also known as diacetic acid, CH_{3}COCH_{2}COO^{−} (or a salt thereof)
