= Replicate =

Replicate may refer to:

- Replicate (biology), the exact copy resulting from self-replication of genetic material, a cell, or an organism
- Replicate (statistics), a fully repeated experiment or set of test conditions.

== See also ==
- Replication (disambiguation)
