= Lloyds Film Storage Corporation =

- An old advertisement for the Lloyds Film Storage Corporation from a 1920 year book.
- Formerly: Films Lloyds, Inc.
- Industry: Film
- Founded: 1914
- Founder: Joseph R. Miles
- Fate: Unknown
- Headquarters: New York City, United States

The Lloyds Film Storage Corporation, originally known as Films Lloyds, Inc., was an American film storage company stationed in New York. It was founded in 1914 by Joseph R. Miles and provided a commercial service of storing motion picture film in regulated, fireproof vaults for a monthly fee. The company's exact dates of operation are unknown, although it was last seen operating in 1959.

== History ==
Prior to 1914, New York City had outlawed mass storage of celluloid film due to concerns over potential fire hazards. Because of this ordinance being frequently violated, New York City’s Corporation Counsel necessitated the formation of an official storage building, placing the project under Joseph R. Miles in 1914. This led to the subsequent founding of Films Lloyds, Inc., which by 1915 would be advertising as Lloyds Film Storage Corporation.

Throughout its years of operation, the Lloyds Film Storage Corporation’s storage services have seen sparse but occasional notable use. In 1927, the American Museum of Natural History had been extensively storing reels with the company in compliance with fire regulations. Thomas H. Ince Corporation was documented to have been regularly storing films with the Lloyds Film Storage Corporation following a signed agreement in 1930. Multiple reels of D.W Griffith’s 1916 film Intolerance were confirmed to have been kept in the company’s storage facilities in the 1930s, with one copy being acquired from these vaults by the George Eastman Museum following Griffith’s death in 1948.

Around 1938, ownership of the Lloyds Film Storage Corporation was confirmed to have transferred to Joseph R. Miles’ widow, Florence Gribbon Miles following Joseph R. Miles’ passing. For the rest of the company’s known years of operation, Florence Gribbon Miles remained as the last known president. It is currently unknown when and why the Lloyds Film Storage Corporation ceased operations.

== Services ==
The Lloyds Film Storage Corporation provided storage for celluloid film reels which were known to suffer from high flammability and deterioration in inadequate conditions due to their common nitrate base. Subscribers paid a monthly fee to have their reels stored in a secured fireproof vault with provided insurance in the event of fires and theft. The company’s monthly storage fee in 1930 ranged from approximately 20 cents to $2 USD per reel. Another small fee was required for on-demand delivery of stored reels.

Due to high monthly costs and the lack of profit made from stored film, the company's storage services were believed to have seen little apparent use compared to the alternative of disposing unwanted films.

In addition to providing storage, the Lloyds Film Storage Corporation has also been recorded serving as an intermediary for buyers and producers of film.

== Buildings ==
An entrance to the vaults in the storage plant on Long Island City from the 1920s.

The majority of the Lloyds Film Storage Corporation’s buildings were typically located in Midtown Manhattan. The company’s office buildings were in separate locations from the storage vaults and contained projection and stock rooms. These office buildings were additionally described as a center for buying and selling film.

The Lloyds Film Storage Corporation’s earliest known storage vault from 1914 was located on multiple floors of a fireproof building, using thick concrete and ventilated metal vaults to minimize the threat level of a nitrate fire. Each vault was described as being capable of holding thousands of film reels. This particular location aimed for a safe yet convenient distance for many motion picture companies and theaters, which were commonly located in areas subject to New York fire regulations.

Around the 1920s, a newer storage plant for the company was constructed in Long Island City. This storage plant measured about 46000 square feet and contained additional facilities for other film-related work, including theaters and editing rooms. In addition to a large number of secure fireproof vaults, this storage plant was constructed with a massive sprinkler system in the event of a fire.
