= Freestone (masonry) =

Type of stone used in masonry

A freestone is a type of stone used in masonry for molding, tracery and other replication work required to be worked with the chisel. Freestone, so named because it can be freely cut in any direction, must be fine-grained, uniform and soft enough to be cut easily without shattering or splitting. Some sources, including numerous nineteenth-century dictionaries, say that the stone has no grain, but this is incorrect. Oolitic stones are generally used, although in some countries soft sandstones are used; in some churches an indurated chalk called clunch is employed for internal lining and for carving.

Some have believed that the word "freemason" originally referred, from the 14th century, to a person capable of carving freestone.

== See also ==
- Bath stone
- Aquia Creek sandstone
- Hummelstown brownstone
