= BFI National Archive =

British Film Institute department

- Interactive map of BFI National Archive
- 51°45′06″N 0°34′40″W
- Location: Kingshill Way, Berkhamsted, HP4 3TP
- Type: Film and television archive
- Established: 1935
- Affiliation: British Film Institute
- Website: Official website

The BFI National Archive is a department of the British Film Institute, and one of the largest film archives in the world. The National Archives collects, preserves, restores, and shares the films and television programmes which have helped to shape and record British life and times since the development of cine film in the late 19th century. The majority of the collection is British originated material, but it also features internationally significant holdings from around the world. The National Archive also collects films which feature key British actors and the work of British directors.

== History ==
The National Archive was founded in 1935 as the National Film Library. The archives first curator was Ernest Lindgren, and the first preservation officer was Harold Brown.

In 1955, the archive became the National Film Archive, and, in 1992, the National Film and Television Archive. It was renamed BFI National Archive in 2006.

== Campuses ==
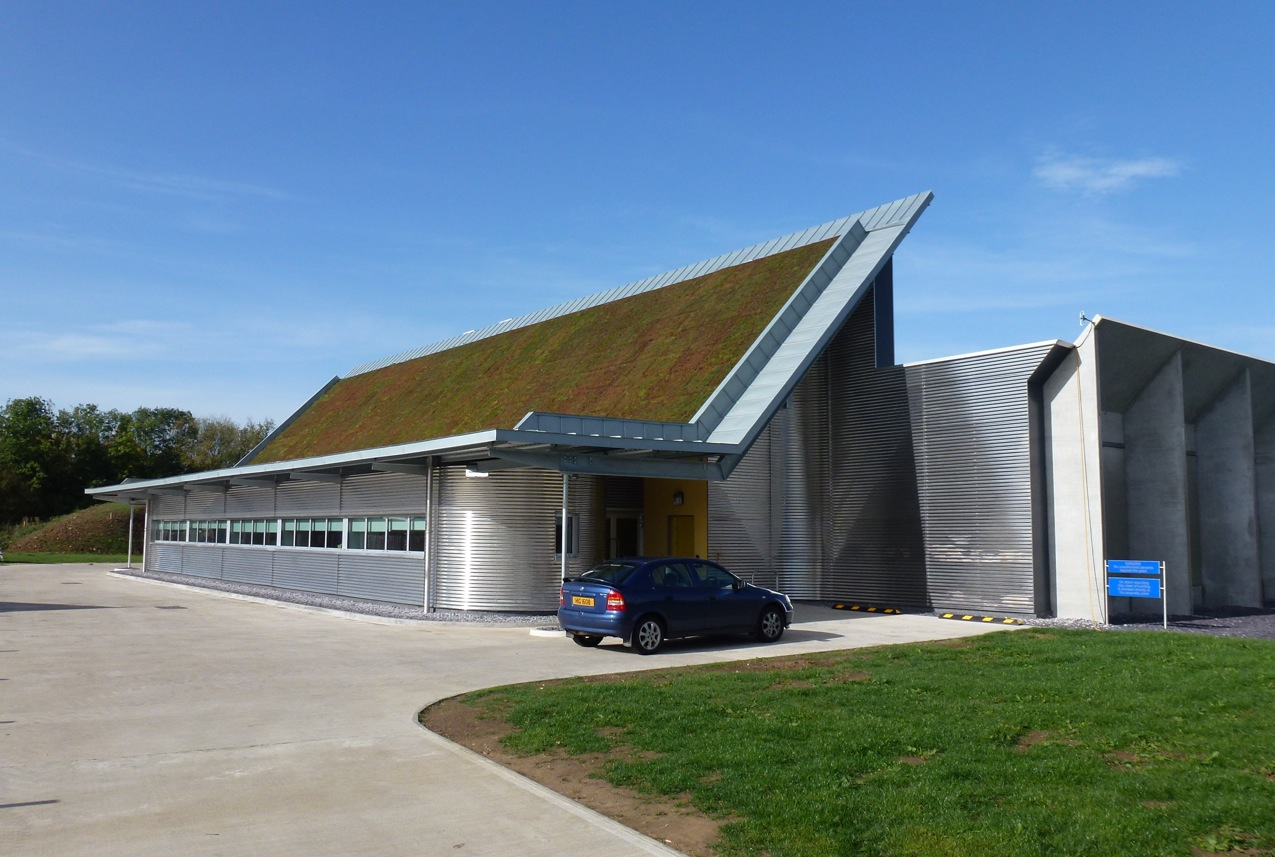
The Master Film Store of the BFI National Archive, Gaydon, Warwickshire, opened 2011, designed by Cullinan Studio.

The National Archive is based across two sites. The J. Paul Getty, Jr. Conservation Centre in Berkhamsted, Hertfordshire, named after its benefactor, is the base for much of the restoration work, while approximately 140 million feet of unstable nitrate film and all the master film collection held on acetate or other media is kept separately at a BFI storage site at Gaydon in Warwickshire.

== Preservation ==
Film preservation is an ongoing project among filmmakers, historians, archivists, museums, and nonprofit organisations to rescue deteriorating film stock and preserve the recorded image. In recent years the BFI National Archive has completed a number of much anticipated restorations of a diverse range of film titles. This has included the Mitchell and Kenyon collection, which consists almost entirely of actuality films commissioned by travelling fairground operators for showing at local fairgrounds or other venues across the UK in the early part of the twentieth century.

Other notable restorations include:

- Alfred Hitchcock's nine surviving silent feature films
- Love, Life and Laughter (1923)
- The Epic of Everest (1924)
- The Great White Silence (1924)
- Shooting Stars (dir. Anthony Asquith, 1927)
- The Battles of Coronel and Falkland Islands (1927)
- Shiraz: A Romance of India (1928)
- The First Born (1928)
- Underground (dir. Anthony Asquith, 1928)
- The Informer (1929)
- The Private Life of Henry VIII (1933)
- Gone with the Wind (1939)
- Hell Drivers (1957)
- Night of the Demon (1957)
- The Day the Earth Caught Fire (1961)
- Women in Love (1969)
- Jabberwocky (1977)

== Collections ==
The BFI National Archive now comprises over 275,000 titles in total consisting of feature, non-fiction, short films (dating from 1894), 210,000 television programmes and some artists' films. It is one of the largest film collections in the world. Notable collections include:

- Mitchell and Kenyon collection
- GPO Film Unit collection
- Central Office of Information (COI) film collection
- Chaplin Out-Takes collection

The archive holds 20,000 silent films including, Cecil Hepworth's Alice in Wonderland (1903), and actively collects artists' moving images. In addition to moving image materials the Special Collections hold the records of filmmakers and institutions. Significant collections include:

- Michael Powell and Emeric Pressburger
- Carol Reed
- David Lean
- Ken Loach
- Derek Jarman
- Alan Parker

Films and television programmes are acquired mainly by donation or, in the case of independent television, via funding direct from the TV companies. Emphasis is placed on British productions but whenever possible important and popular movies from overseas are also acquired. Films from the Archive have also acted as material for the BFI's programme of artists' moving image commissions, most notably through the programme of the BFI Gallery, the contemporary art space dedicated to artists' moving image active at BFI Southbank between 2007 and 2011.

== See also ==
- National Film Registry – the registry of films selected by the United States National Film Preservation Board for preservation in the Library of Congress
- List of archives in the United Kingdom
- Lists of film archives
