= Film cement =

Glue for splicing ciné film

Film cement is a special glue designed to join motion picture film. It is made of film base dissolved in a solvent. Two cut sections of film are spliced together in a film splicer using film cement.

Splices can be made either with a "hot" splicer, or the splicer unplugged and at room temperature. It is most important that the emulsion of the film be scraped off prior to applying the cement or the splice will fail.

Film cement also has a workable life span, if the amount of solvent falls below a certain level the splices will fail. Cement life can be extended by the careful addition of its solvent, usually methyl ethyl ketone (MEK) or acetone.

Film cement can only be used with acetate, triacetate and nitrate films. Film cement cannot be used with polyester based film.
