= Cellulose acetate film =

Base material for photographic emulsions

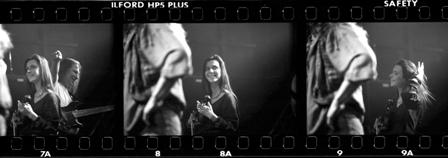
Ilford HP5 Plus Safety Film

Cellulose acetate film, or safety film, is used in photography as a base material for photographic emulsions. It was introduced in the early 20th century by film manufacturers and intended as a safe film base replacement for unstable and highly flammable nitrate film.

Cellulose diacetate film was first employed commercially for photographic film in 1909. Cellulose acetate propionate and cellulose acetate butyrate were introduced in the 1930s, and cellulose triacetate in the late 1940s. Acetate films were later replaced by polyester bases.

The motion picture industry continued to use cellulose nitrate supports until the introduction of cellulose triacetate in 1948, which met the rigorous safety and performance standards set by the cinematographic industry. The chemical instability of cellulose acetate material, unrecognized at the time of its introduction, has since become a major problem for film archives and collections.

== History ==
Cellulose diacetate film was first created by the German chemists Arthur Eichengrün and Theodore Becker, who patented it under the name Cellit, from a process they devised in 1901 for the direct acetylation of cellulose at a low temperature to prevent its degradation, which permitted the degree of acetylation to be controlled, thereby avoiding total conversion to its triacetate. Cellit was a stable, non-brittle cellulose acetate polymer that could be dissolved in acetone for further processing. A cellulose diacetate film more readily dissolved in acetone was developed by the American chemist George Miles in 1904. Miles's process (partially hydrolysing the polymer) was employed commercially for photographic film in 1909 by Eastman Kodak and the Pathé Frères. Starting with cellulose diacetate, this innovation continued with cellulose acetate propionate and cellulose acetate butyrate in the 1930s, and finally in the late 1940s, cellulose triacetate was introduced, and later polyester bases. These less flammable substitutes for nitrate film were called safety film.

=== Boroid ===
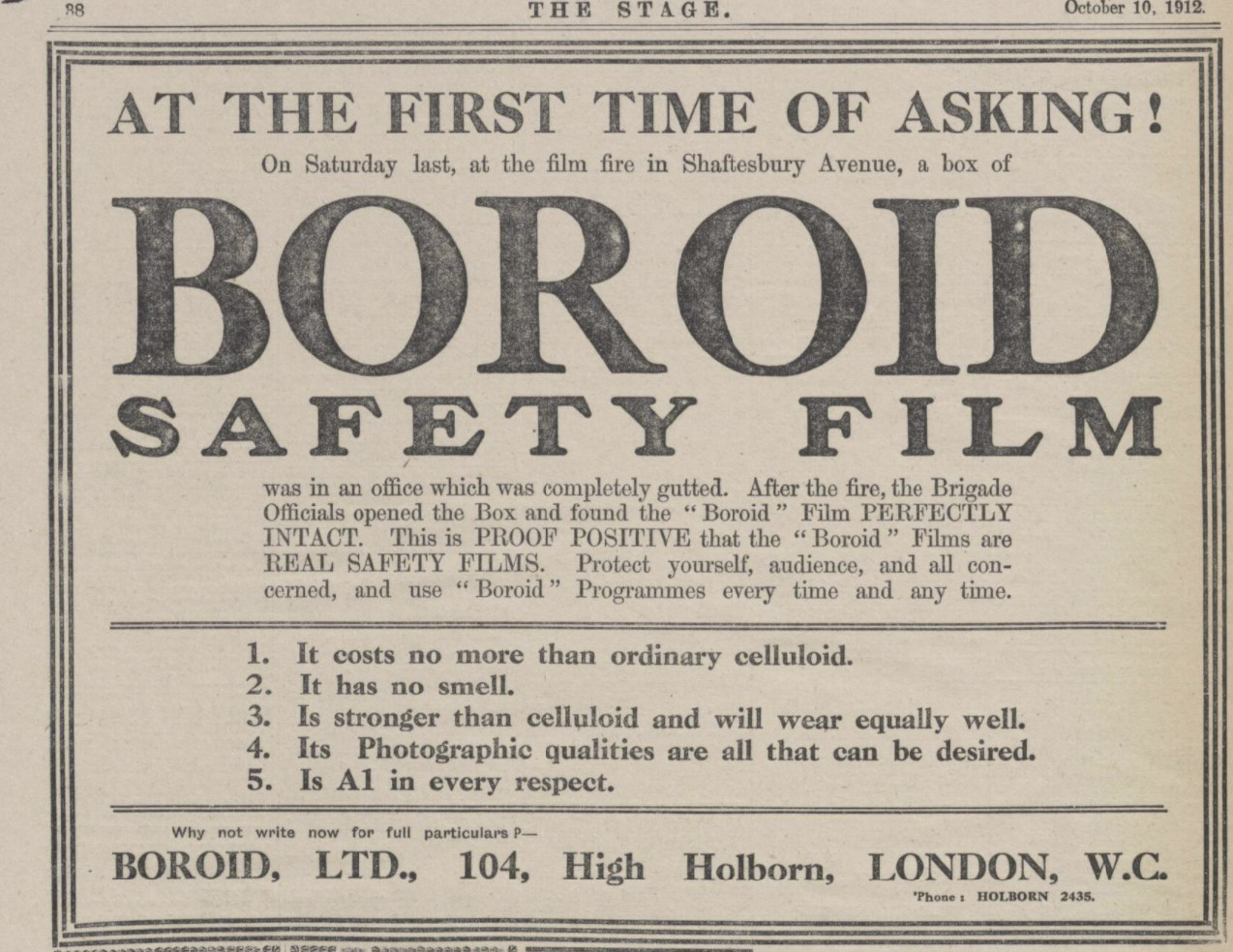
BOROID advertisement 'The Stage'

In 1910, a newly discovered, non-inflammable, film format 'BOROID' was presented to the British cinematographic trade using acetate-based cellulose. It was developed, he claimed 'accidentally', by the prolific inventor Benno Borzykowski, a partner in Photochemie G.m.b.H. Berlin, and Director of the Benobor Syndicate, who had worked on other patents for artificial silk and other fabrics. BOROID was a by-product of that work by Borzykowski, but was not patented. ("The process has not been patented and will not be; it is a secret formula known only to the inventor and two trustees in England. He has never sold the process itself, merely the right to manufacture and market…")

Borzykowski published other UK patents including "Original printed patent application number 21,719 for a new or improved process for the production of a substitute for glass sheets or plates and other articles…" in 1910. The Boroid company commenced trading on 21 November 1910, being originally registered in London at 58 Coleman St., moving to 104 High Holborn in May 1911, and finally to 48 Rupert St. in June 1913.

Boroid Ltd. issued its detailed share prospectus in the (Westminster Gazette of Monday 16 January 1911 (P12 col. 1 and 2): A number of testimonials were provided, including a very detailed one from Alfred J West F.R.G.S. of 'Our Navy', in which he proposed to move his entire production to 'non-flam' BOROID film: 'BOROID' had most of its assets in Germany, and the Great War of 1914-1919 put an immediate end to the business in the UK when BOROID film stock became unavailable. A Receiver was appointed by the debenture holders on 12 May 1914 (The London Project). Borzykowski moved to America and was interviewed in an article in the Educational Film Magazine in the April 1919 edition.

== Decay and the "vinegar syndrome" ==
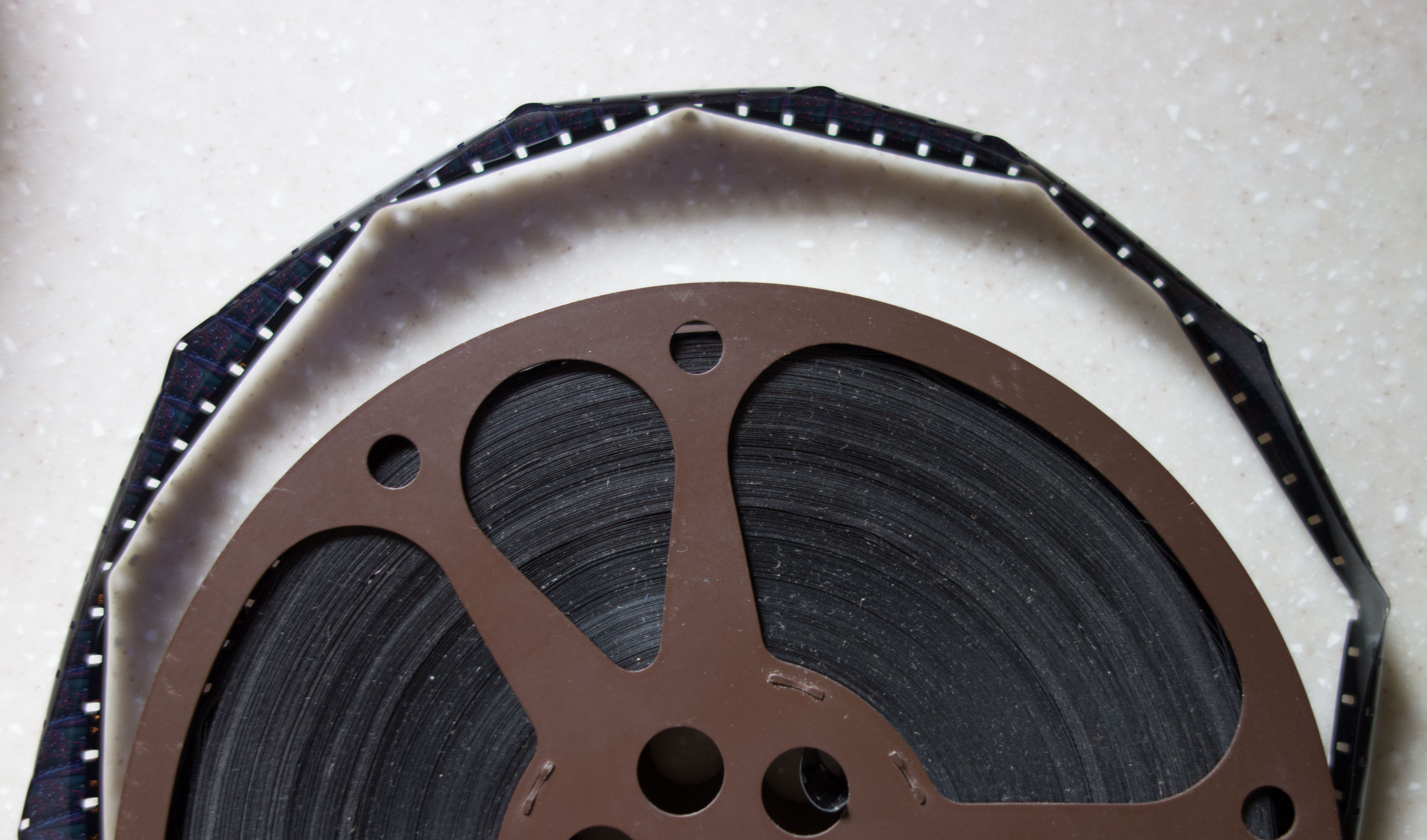
Shrinking and warpage of 16 mm film caused by vinegar syndrome

Beginning in the 1980s, there was a great deal of focus upon film stability following frequent reports of cellulose triacetate degradation. Cellulose acetate releases acetic acid, the key ingredient in vinegar, which is responsible for its acidic smell. The problem became known as "vinegar syndrome". This accelerates degradation within the film, and can also contribute to damage to surrounding films and metals.

The first instance of cellulose triacetate degradation was reported to the Eastman Kodak Company within a decade of its introduction in 1948. The first report came from the Government of India, whose film materials were stored in hot, humid conditions. It was followed by further reports of degradation from collections stored in similar conditions. These observations resulted in continuing studies in the Kodak laboratories during the 1960s. Film degradation can only be delayed by storage in dry and cold conditions. It was initially thought that storage under recommended conditions might delay decay by 450 years, but some films are developing vinegar syndrome after just 70 years of cold dry storage. Arri and others sold film recorders specifically for recording video onto film for archival purposes based on the assumption that vinegar syndrome could be delayed for long periods of time.

=== Testing for degradation ===
A testing product developed by the Image Permanence Institute, A-D, or "acid-detection" indicator strips change color from blue through shades of green to yellow with increasing exposure to acid. According to the test User's Guide, they were "created to aid in the preservation of collections of photographic film, including sheet and roll films, cinema film, and microfilm. They provide a nondestructive method of determining the extent of vinegar syndrome in film collections." These tools can be used to determine the extent of damage to a film collection and which steps should be taken to prolong their usability.

== Preservation and storage ==
Currently there is no practical way of halting or reversing the course of degradation. Many film collectors use camphor tablets but it is not known what the long term effects on the film would be. While there has been significant research regarding various methods of slowing degradation, such as storage in molecular sieves, temperature and moisture are the two key factors affecting the rate of deterioration. According to the Image Permanence Institute, fresh acetate film stored at a temperature of 21 °C (70 °F) and 40% relative humidity will last approximately 50 years before the onset of vinegar syndrome. Reducing the temperature by 8.3 °C (15 °F) while maintaining the same level of humidity brings a dramatic improvement: at a temperature of 13 °C (55 °F) and 40% relative humidity, the estimated time until onset of vinegar syndrome is 150 years. A combination of low temperature and low relative humidity represents the optimum storage condition for cellulose acetate base films, with the caveat that relative humidity should not be lowered below 20%, or the film will dry out too much and become brittle.

Cold storage options for the preservation of acetate film range from insulated cold storage rooms, or vaults, with relative humidity control (typical settings in the range of 2–4 °C (35–40 °F) temperature, and 30–35% relative humidity), which might be used by archival institutions for large and medium-sized collections, to free-standing freezer units, which can be cost-effective for small collections, but necessitate vapor-proof packaging of the films to protect against relative humidity extremes and condensation. Commercial storage facilities may offer varying environmental conditions at different rates.

Microenvironments—the conditions inside an enclosure—can also affect the condition of cellulose acetate film. Enclosures that are breathable or that contain an acid absorbent are instrumental in reducing the rate of decay due to vinegar syndrome. Sealed metal containers can trap the decay products released by the film, promoting the spread of vinegar syndrome.

== Rescuing damaged film ==
During early stages of decay, the film content can be rescued by transferring it to new film stock. Once the film becomes too brittle or the shrinkage is excessive, it cannot be copied. Because the gelatin emulsion usually stays intact during the degradation process, it is possible to save the image on sheet film using solvents to dissolve the base off the emulsion. Once the emulsion has been freed from the shrunken support, it can be photographed or transferred to a new support. Because of the solvents used, this is a delicate and potentially hazardous procedure and is an expensive process for a large collection. Degraded motion picture film cannot be restored in this way, but sheet films often can.

== Other uses ==
Cellulose acetate film is also used to make replicates of materials and biological samples for microscopy. The techniques were developed for metallographic needs to examine the grain structure of polished metals. Replication can be used to understand the distribution, for example, of different types of iron in carbon steel samples, or the fine distribution of damage to a sample subject to mechanical wear.
