= Cellulose acetate =

Organic compounds which are acetate esters of cellulose

Structural formula of cellulose diacetate. The chemical formula shows a section of cellulose with two acetyl groups per glucose module.

In biochemistry, cellulose acetate refers to any acetate ester of cellulose, usually cellulose diacetate. It was first prepared in 1865. A bioplastic, cellulose acetate is used as a film base in photography, as a component in some coatings, and as a frame material for eyeglasses; it is also used as a synthetic fiber in the manufacture of cigarette filters and playing cards. In photographic film, cellulose acetate film replaced nitrate film in the 1950s, being far less flammable and cheaper to produce.

Water-soluble cellulose acetate (WSCA) has been used as a dietary fiber (prebiotic), in relation with weight loss and Akkermansia muciniphila.

== History ==
In 1865, French chemist Paul Schützenberger discovered that cellulose reacts with acetic anhydride to form cellulose acetate. The German chemists Arthur Eichengrün and Theodore Becker invented the first soluble forms of cellulose acetate in 1903.

In 1904, Camille Dreyfus and his younger brother Henri performed chemical research and development on cellulose acetate in a shed in their father's garden in Basel, Switzerland, which was then a center of the dye industry. For five years, the Dreyfus brothers studied and experimented in a systematic manner in Switzerland and France. By 1910, they were producing film for the motion picture industry, and a small but constantly growing amount of acetate lacquer, called "dope", was sold to the expanding aircraft industry to coat the fabric covering wings and fuselage.

In 1913, after some twenty thousand separate experiments, they produced excellent laboratory samples of continuous filament yarn, something that had eluded the cellulose acetate industry to this time. Unfortunately, the outbreak of World War I postponed commercial development of this process.

In November 1914, the British Government invited Camille Dreyfus to come to England to manufacture acetate dope, and the "British Cellulose and Chemical Manufacturing Co" was set up. In 1917, after the United States had entered the war, the U.S. War Department invited Dreyfus to establish a similar factory in the U.S. Both operations were run successfully throughout the war.

After the war, attention returned to the production of acetate fibers. The first yarn was of fair quality, but sales resistance was heavy, and silk associates worked zealously to discredit acetate and discourage its use. However, the thermoplastic nature of acetate made it an excellent fiber for moiré because the pattern was permanent and did not wash away. The same characteristic also made permanent pleating a commercial fact for the first time, and gave great style impetus to the whole dress industry.

The mixing of silk and acetate in fabrics was accomplished at the beginning, and almost at once cotton was also blended, thus making possible low-cost fabrics by means of a fiber which then was cheaper than silk or acetate. Today, acetate is blended with silk, cotton, wool, nylon, etc. to give fabrics wrinkle recovery, heft, handle, draping quality, quick drying, proper dimensional stability, cross-dye pattern potential, at a competitive price.

== Types ==
There are types of cellulose acetate with mixed‐ester derivatives.

- Cellulose Acetate Butyrate
- Cellulose Acetate Propionate

== Chemical and physical properties ==
The density of cellulose acetate is between 1.26 and 1.31 g/cm³

== Use as a fiber ==
Cellulose acetate fiber, one of the earliest synthetic fibers, is based on cotton or tree pulp cellulose ("biopolymers"). These "cellulosic fibers" have been replaced in many applications by cheaper petro-based fibers (nylon and polyester) in recent decades.

Trade names for acetate include Acele, Avisco, Celanese, Chromspun, and Estron.

Acetate shares many similarities with rayon, and was formerly considered as the same textile. Acetate differs from rayon in the employment of acetic acid in production. The two fabrics are now required to be listed distinctly on garment labels.

Rayon resists heat while acetate is prone to melting. Acetate must be laundered with care either by hand-washing or dry cleaning.

The breathable nature of the fabric suits it for use as a lining. Acetate fabric is used frequently in wedding gowns and other bridal attire. Its lustrous sheen and smooth, satiny texture make it a good alternative to silk.

=== Properties ===
Acetate is a low cost, manufactured fiber, which has good draping qualities. Acetate is used in fabrics such as satins, brocades, knit fabrics, and taffetas to accentuate luster, body, drape, and beauty.

- Hand: soft, smooth, dry, crisp, resilient
- Comfort: breathes, wicks, dries quickly, no static cling
- Drape: linings move with the body linings conform to the garment
- Color: deep brilliant shades with atmospheric dyeing meet colorfastness requirements
- Luster: light reflection creates a signature appearance
- Performance: colorfast to perspiration staining, colorfast to dry cleaning, air and vapor permeable
- Tenacity: weak fiber with breaking tenacity of 1.2 to 1.4 g/d; rapidly loses strength when wet
- Abrasion: poor resistance
- Heat retention: poor thermal retention; no allergenic potential (hypoallergenic)
- Dyeability: (two methods) cross-dying method where yarns of one fiber and those of another fiber are woven into a fabric in a desired pattern; solution-dying method provides excellent color fastness under the effects of sunlight, perspiration, air contaminants and washing

=== Characteristics ===
- cellulosic and thermoplastic
- selective absorption and removal of low levels of certain organic chemicals
- easily bonded with plasticizers, heat, and pressure
- acetate is soluble in many common solvents (especially acetone and other organic solvents) and can be modified to be soluble in alternative solvents, including water
- hydrophilic: acetate wets easily, with good liquid transport and excellent absorption; in textile applications, it provides comfort and absorbency, but also loses strength when wet
- acetate fibers are hypoallergenic
- high surface area
- made from wood pulp, a renewable resource
- can be composted , incinerated or carbonised
- can be dyed, however special dyes and pigments are required since acetate does not accept dyes ordinarily used for cotton and rayon (this also allows cross-dyeing)
- resistant to mold and mildew
- easily weakened by strong alkaline solutions and strong oxidizing agents
- can usually be washed or dry cleaned; generally does not shrink

=== Confusion with cellulose triacetate ===
Cellulose diacetate and cellulose triacetate are mistakenly referred to as the same fiber; although they are similar, their chemical identities differ. Triacetate is known as a generic description or primary acetate containing no hydroxyl group. Acetate fiber is known as modified or secondary acetate having two or more hydroxyl groups. Triacetate fibers, although no longer produced in the United States, contain a higher ratio of acetate-to-cellulose than do acetate fibers.

== Film ==
Cellulose acetate film, made from cellulose diacetate and later cellulose triacetate, was introduced in 1934 as a replacement for the cellulose nitrate film stock that had previously been standard. When exposed to heat or moisture, acids in the film base begin to deteriorate to an unusable state, releasing acetic acid with a characteristic vinegary smell, causing the process to be known as "vinegar syndrome". Acetate film stock is still used in some applications, such as camera negative for motion pictures. Since the 1980s, polyester film stock (sometimes referred to under Kodak's trade name "ESTAR Base") has become more commonplace, particularly for archival applications. Acetate film was also used as the base for magnetic tape, prior to the advent of polyester film.

== Magnetic tape ==
Cellulose acetate magnetic tape was introduced by IBM in 1952 for use on their IBM 726 tape drive in the IBM 701 computer. It was much lighter and easier to handle than the metal tape introduced by UNIVAC in 1951 for use on their UNISERVO tape drive in the UNIVAC I computer. In 1956, cellulose acetate magnetic tape was replaced by the more stable PET film magnetic tape for use on their IBM 727 tape drive.

== Other products ==
Due to the material properties which make it usable as a fabric, fiber, or plastic, cellulose acetate is used to manufacture a wide variety products; for example, in the world of fabrics, acetate is utilized to make dresses, blouses, party attire, award ribbons, buttons, home furnishings such as draperies and upholstery slip covers, among other uses. Plastic eyeglass frames are also frequently manufactured of acetates, as are absorbent products like diapers, ink reservoirs for fiber tip pens, and cigarette filters. LEGO bricks were originally manufactured of acetate from 1949 to 1963, as are some brands of high-end playing cards, such as Kem and Modiano Platinum. Additionally, overhead-projection transparencies are frequently produced on acetate sheets.

== Production ==
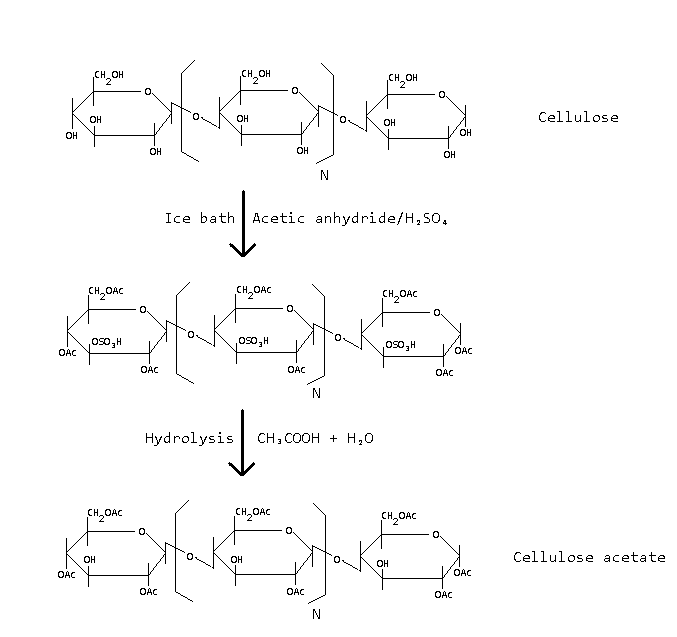
Cellulose acetate preparation

The Federal Trade Commission definition for acetate fiber is: "A manufactured fiber in which the fiber-forming substance is cellulose acetate. Where not less than 92 percent of the hydroxyl groups are acetylated, the term triacetate may be used as a generic description of the fiber."

Acetate is derived from cellulose by initially deconstructing wood pulp into a purified fluffy white cellulose. To manufacture a good product, special qualities of pulps, such as dissolving pulps, are used. The uneven reactivity of cellulose presents a common problem affecting the quality of the cellulose acetate product. The cellulose is reacted with acetic acid and acetic anhydride in the presence of sulfuric acid. It is subjected to a controlled, partial hydrolysis to remove the sulfate and a sufficient number of acetate groups to give the product the desired properties. The anhydroglucose unit is the fundamental repeating structure of cellulose and has three hydroxyl groups which can react to form acetate esters. The most common form of cellulose acetate fiber has an acetate group on approximately two of every three hydroxyls. This cellulose diacetate is known as secondary acetate, or simply as "acetate".

After it is formed, cellulose acetate is dissolved in acetone, forming a viscous solution for extrusion through spinnerets (which resemble a shower head). As the filaments emerge, the solvent is evaporated in warm air via dry spinning, producing fine cellulose acetate fibers.

The first U.S. commercial acetate fiber was produced by the Celanese Corporation in 1924. Current U.S. acetate fiber producers are Celanese, and Eastman Chemical Company. Cellulose acetate fiber in a form of filament yarn is also manufactured in the EU by DP Acetate.

=== Method ===
To this day, no process for the direct production of cellulose acetates has been discovered. As attempts to produce a partial esterification of cellulose result only in a mixture of non-acetylated and fully acetylated cellulose, a two-step synthesis is applied: Cellulose is always completely converted first to cellulose triacetate and then by hydrolysis into cellulose acetates with low degrees of esterification.

Purified cellulose from wood pulp or cotton linters is mixed with glacial acetic acid, acetic anhydride, and a catalyst. The mixture is aged 20 hours during which partial hydrolysis occurs and acid resin precipitates as flakes. These are dissolved in acetone and the solution is purified by filtering. The solution is extruded by spinning in a column of warm air. Solvent is recovered. Filaments are stretched and wound onto beams, cones, or bobbins ready for use. Filaments are finally spun into fiber.

The production is divided into the following process stages:

- Mechanical conditioning of the pulp: The pulp, which is usually provided as roll or sheet pulp, is fibrillated by means of different types of shredders, such as hammermills and disk refiners, whereby the successive arrangement of both types of shredder ensures optimum dissolving.
- Chemical pre-treatment: The fibrillated cellulose is treated with acetic acid (if necessary with the addition of small quantities of sulphuric acid) with moderate stirring at 25 °C to 50 °C for about 1 h, resulting in continuous evaporation and condensation of the acetic acid in the spaces between the fibre particles. This causes the cellulose particles to swell, which facilitates the diffusion of the solvent particles into these particles during the following process stage. In addition to this acetic acid vapour pretreatment, there is also a pretreatment in a thin-pulp state. In this process, the cellulose is introduced into large quantities of water or diluted acetic acid and intensively stirred. Subsequent process steps such as pressing or centrifuging constantly increase the concentration of cellulose in the pulp. At the same time, acetic acid is added in ever higher concentrations. The advantage of this process is the saving of shredding, as the cellulose layers can be added directly into the stirred tank.
- Acetylating the cellulose: In the commercial production of cellulose acetates, the acetic acid process or the methylene chloride process are usually used for acetylation. In acetic acid processes, the pre-treated cellulose mass is reacted in an acetylation mixture of the solvent acetic acid with an excess of acetic anhydride, which serves as an esterification agent, and with sulphuric acid as a catalyst under vigorous mechanical mixing. The reaction is highly exothermic and therefore intensive cooling of the reaction vessels is required. The esterification process is terminated by adding water when a highly viscous clear reaction mixture has formed from the fibrous pulp. This solution must be gel-free and have the desired viscosity. In the methylene chloride process, methylene chloride is used in the acetylation mixture as a solvent instead of acetic acid. Since the low-boiling methylene chloride can be easily removed by distillation, process control is achieved even with highly viscous solutions. Even at low temperatures it can dissolve cellulose triacetate very well. A small amount of sulfuric acid can be used as a catalyst, but often also perchloric acid. However, acetic acid is usually also formed as a by-product of the reaction, so that the solvent is ultimately a mixture of methylene chloride, acetic anhydride and acetic acid. A very rare heterogeneous process is the fiber acetate process, which is only used for the production of cellulose triacetate as an end product. In this process, the cellulose is suspended in a non-solvent (such as benzene) and esterified with acetic anhydride in the presence of perchloric acid as catalyst.
- Partial hydrolysis: The desired secondary cellulose acetate types are obtained from cellulose triacetate by hydrolysis. For this purpose, the triacetate solution is heated to usually 60 to 80 °C in the presence of an acid catalyst (usually sulfuric acid) by adding water upon stirring and heating. The hydrolysis is controlled by the concentration of the sulfuric acid, the amount of water and the temperature in such a way that the desired molecular degradation (chain scission) is achieved. The hydrolysis process is then stopped by adding basic salts (e.g. sodium or magnesium acetate) which neutralize the acid catalyst.
- Precipitation of the cellulose acetate: When precipitating cellulose acetate from the reaction solution using dilute acetic acid, it is important to obtain uniform and easily washable cellulose acetate flakes. Before precipitation, any methylene chloride present must be completely distilled off. The acetic acid is then recovered.
- Washing and drying: By intensive washing, which is usually done in countercurrent, the acetic acid must be removed from the flakes down to the smallest traces, otherwise damage ("charring") will occur during the drying process. After the washing liquid has been pressed off, the flakes are dried on a conveyor belt dryer through which hot air flows to a residual moisture content of approx. 2-5%. For the subsequent production of very high-quality, thermally stable, brightly colored and color-stable thermoplastic molding compounds, the cellulose acetate flakes are also bleached and stabilized in additional process steps (to minimize thermal degradation and discoloration) before final drying.
- Mixing of the flakes: The final steps are similar to the processing of other plastics: Before the cellulose acetate flakes are transported to a collection container from where they are transported to the appropriate processing plants, the flakes are mixed in a precisely controlled manner. This is to compensate for deviations of the cellulose acetates from different production batches. For many further processing steps the flakes are usually ground into fine powders beforehand. In order to be able to use the cellulose acetate in plastics processing methods such as injection moulding, the powder must also be mixed with suitable plasticisers and other additives, such as functional additives for thermal, weathering, UV and IR stabilisation. The mixtures can be adapted to the corresponding subsequent processing requirements. From the compound produced by melting, granules are produced which can be delivered to the plastics processors.

== Disposal and degradation ==
The global production of CA materials was over 800,000 tonnes (790,000 long tons; 880,000 short tons) per year in 2008. While it was initially believed that CA was virtually non-biodegradable, it has been shown that after initial partial deacetylation, the polymer's cellulose backbone is readily biodegraded by cellulase enzymes. In biologically highly active soil, CA fibers are completely destroyed after 4–9 months. Photodegradation is optimal with 280 nm or shorter wavelength UV-irradiation and enhanced by TiO_{2} pigment. CA cigarette filters take years to be broken down in the open.

== Trade names ==
Cellulose acetate is marketed under various trade names, such as Tenite (Eastman Chemical Company), zyl and zylonite, Cellon (Deutsche Celluloid Fabrik in Eilenburg, Germany), and Rhodoid (Soc. des Usines Chim. Rhone-Poulenc in Paris, France; May & Baker Ltd. in London, UK). Cast film of cellulose acetate manufactured by Celanese (Derbyshire, UK) is sold as Clarifoil.

== Other cellulose esters ==
Cellulose acetate butyrate (CAB, Tenite II) and cellulose acetate propionate are related derivatives of cellulose, which are both used in inks and coatings. The chief difference between these and cellulose acetate is their solubility in a wider range of solvents. CAB is widely used for tool handles, due to its toughness and resistance to oil and gasoline.

== See also ==
- Safety film
- Stealth aircraft
- Textile
- Rayon
