= Vinegar syndrome =

Type of deterioration of film stock

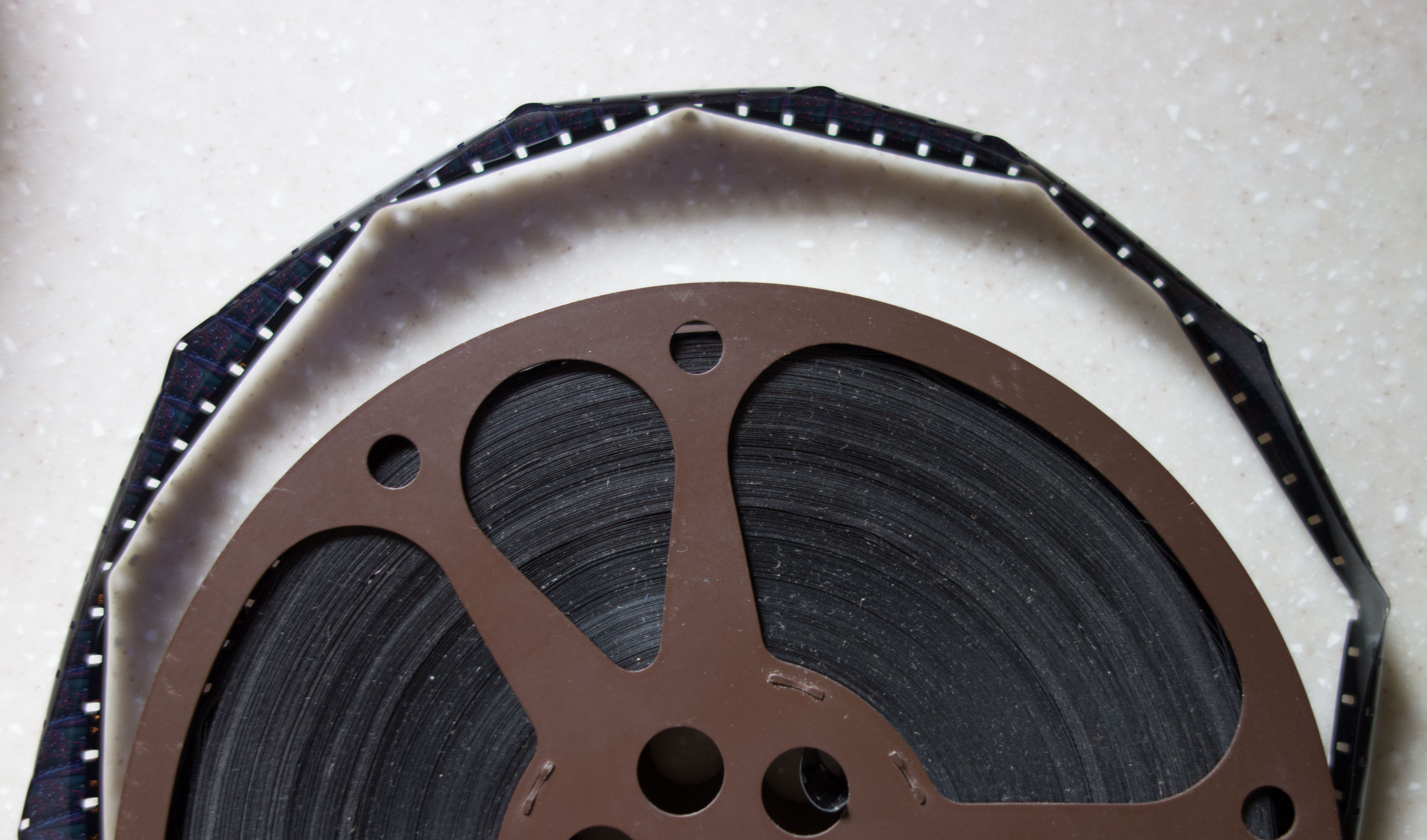
Shrinking and warpage of 16 mm film caused by vinegar syndrome

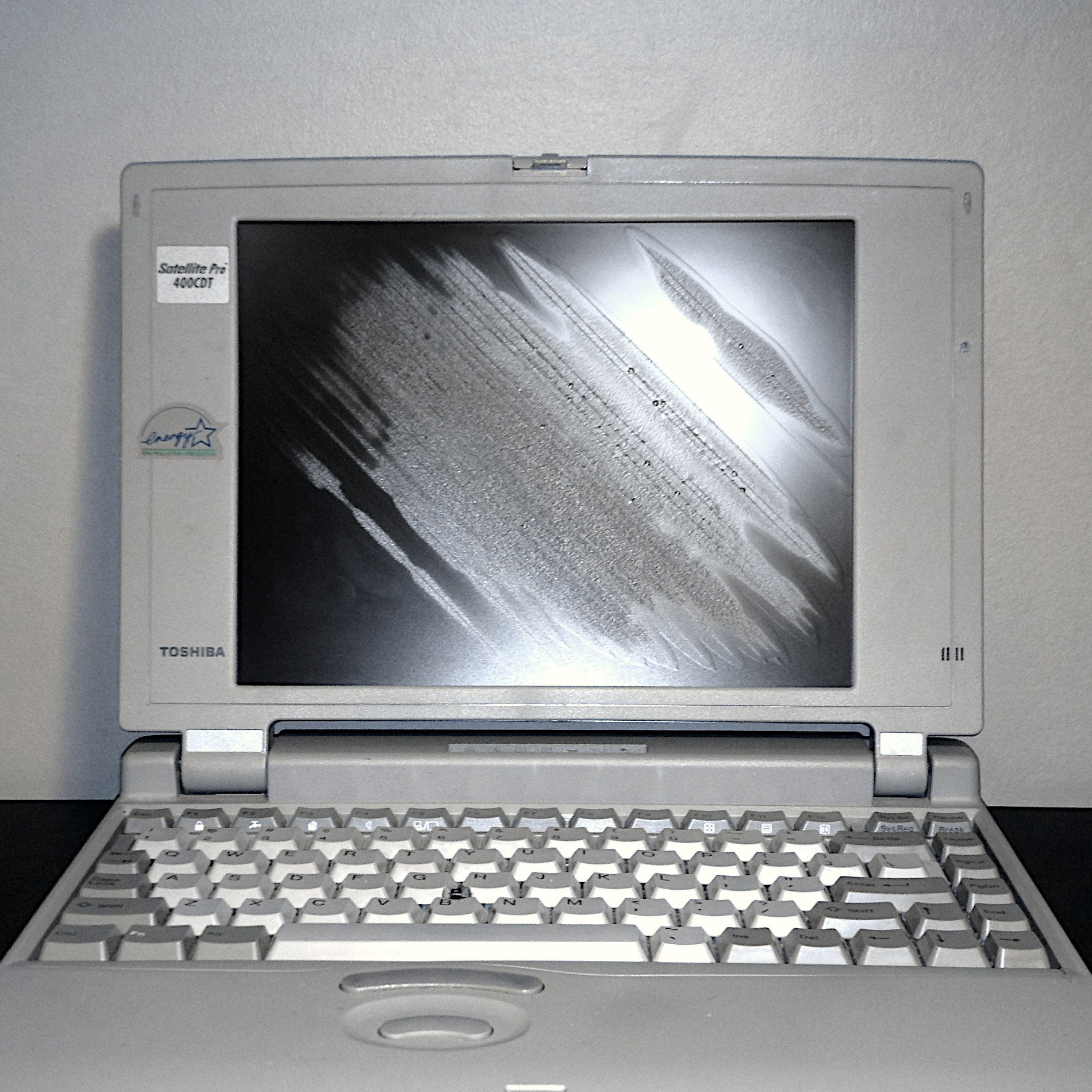
Bubbling and warpage of a laptop's LCD polarizer caused by vinegar syndrome

Vinegar syndrome, also known as acetic acid syndrome, is a condition created by the deacetylation of cellulose acetates (usually cellulose diacetate) and cellulose triacetate. This deacetylation produces acetic acid, producing a vinegar odor that gives the condition its name. Objects undergoing vinegar syndrome often shrink, embrittle, and form crystals on their surface due to the migration of plasticizers. Vinegar syndrome widely affects cellulose acetate film as used in photography. It has also been observed to affect older magnetic tape, where cellulose acetate is used as a base, as well as polarizers used in liquid-crystal display units and everyday plastics such as containers and tableware. High temperatures and fluctuations in relative humidity have been observed to accelerate the process. The process is autocatalytic, and the damage done by vinegar syndrome is irreversible.

== History ==
The first instance of cellulose triacetate degradation was reported to the Eastman Kodak Company within a decade of its introduction in 1948. The first report came from the Government of India, whose film materials were stored in hot, humid conditions. It was followed by further reports of degradation from collections stored in similar conditions. These observations resulted in continuing studies in the Kodak laboratories during the 1960s. Film degradation can only be delayed by storage in dry and cold conditions. It was initially thought that storage under recommended conditions might delay decay by 450 years, but some films are developing vinegar syndrome after just 70 years of cold dry storage.

The film preservationist Harold Brown is credited with coining the phrase "vinegar syndrome".

== The progression of degradation ==
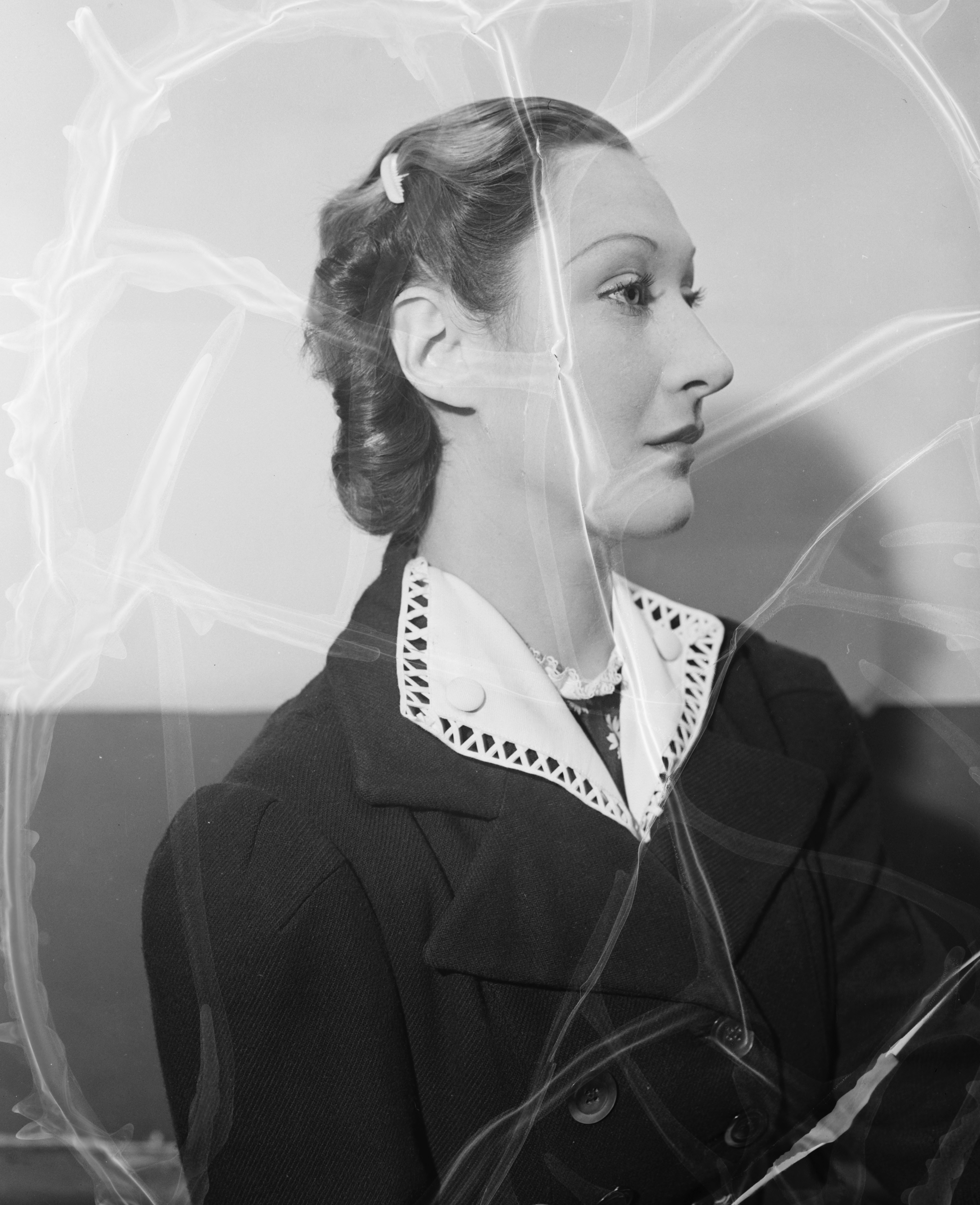
Still photograph exhibiting damage to its negative due to vinegar syndrome

In acetate film, acetyl (CH_{3}CO) groups are attached to long molecular chains of cellulose. With exposure to moisture, heat, or acids, these acetyl groups break from their molecular bonds and acetic acid is released. While the acid is initially released inside the plastic, it gradually diffuses to the surface, causing a characteristic vinegary smell. The decay process follows this pattern:

- Acetic acid is released during the initial acetate base deterioration, leading to the characteristic vinegar odor. This signal marks the progression of deterioration.
- The plastic film base becomes brittle. This occurs in the advanced stages of deterioration, weakening the film and causing it to shatter with the slightest tension. These physical changes happen because cellulose acetate consists of long chains of repeating units, or polymers. When the acetic acid is released as these groups break off, the acidic environment helps to break the links between units, shortening the polymer chains and leading to brittleness.
- Shrinkage also occurs during this process. With the cellulose acetate polymer chains breaking into smaller pieces, and with their side groups splitting off, the plastic film begins to shrink. In advanced stages of deterioration, shrinkage can be as much as 10%. There have been some reports of film 35 mm wide shrinking to almost 17 mm.
- As the acetate base shrinks, the gelatin emulsion of the film does not shrink, because it is not undergoing deterioration. The emulsion and film base separate, causing buckling, referred to by archivists as 'channelling.' Sheet films are often severely channelled in the later stages of degradation.
- Crystalline deposits or liquid-filled bubbles appear on the emulsion. These are evidence of plasticizers, additives to the plastic base, becoming incompatible with the film base and oozing out on the surface. This discharge of plasticizers is a sign of advanced degradation.
- In some cases, pink or blue colors appear in some sheet films. This is caused by antihalation dyes, which are normally colorless and incorporated into the gelatin layer. When acetic acid is formed during deterioration, the acidic environment causes the dyes to return to their original pink or blue color.

== Testing ==
A testing product developed by the Image Permanence Institute, A-D, or "acid-detection" indicator strips change color from blue through shades of green to yellow with increasing exposure to acid. According to the test User's Guide, they were "created to aid in the preservation of collections of photographic film, including sheet and roll films, cinema film, and microfilm. They provide a nondestructive method of determining the extent of vinegar syndrome in film collections." These tools can be used to determine the extent of damage to a film collection and which steps should be taken to prolong their usability.

== See also ==
- Sticky-shed syndrome
