= Replicator =

Replicator may refer to:

== Science ==
- Replicator (evolution unit), the theoretical basic unit of evolution in the gene-centered view of evolution
- Replicator (self-replication), a component that facilitates self-replication
  - DNA replication, the process of producing two identical copies from one original DNA molecule
- Replicator (nanotechnology), a device to precisely position molecules to guide chemical reactions
- Clanking replicator, an artificial self-replicating system that relies on conventional large-scale technology and automation
- Replicator equation, a deterministic monotone non-linear and non-innovative game dynamic used in evolutionary game theory
- Replicator (cellular automaton), a pattern

== In military use ==
- Replicator (United States military), a program created to build weapons and gear faster and more cheaply than typical

== In culture ==
- Replicator (Stargate), a fictional species in the Stargate universe
- Replicator (Star Trek), a fictional technology in the Star Trek universe
- Replicator (band), a noise rock band from Oakland, California

== See also ==
- Replication (disambiguation)
