= Film base =

Layer in photographic film

A film base is the structural layer of photographic film which acts as a support medium for the film's light-sensitive layers of photographic emulsion. Despite the numerous layers and coatings associated with the emulsion layer, the base generally accounts for the vast majority of the thickness of any given film stock. Since the late 19th century, there have been three major types of film base in use: cellulose nitrate (until about 1951), cellulose acetate, and polyester.

== Nitrate ==
In the literature of photography, "nitrate" is used as a synonym for the chemical nitrocellulose. It is also referred to as "cellulose nitrate". Nitrocellulose is guncotton, the first replacement propellant for gun powder in firearms.

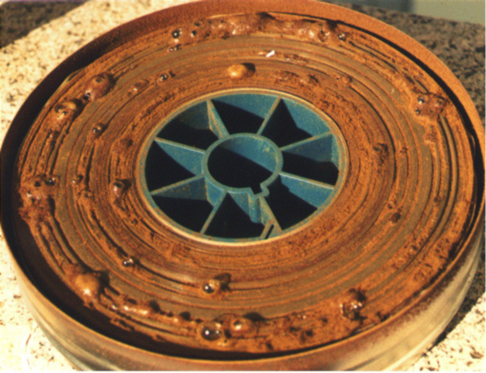
A can of decomposing nitrate film

Film stock with a nitrate base was the first transparent flexible plasticized base commercially available, thanks to celluloid developments by John Carbutt, Hannibal Goodwin, and Eastman Kodak in the 1880s. Kodak was the first to manufacture the film stock for public sale, in 1889. Unfortunately, nitrate also had the serious drawback of being extremely flammable, the characteristic that made it a suitable substitute for gunpowder. It gradually decomposes producing a flammable gas, becomes sticky and, at a late stage of decomposition, the film oozes a gooey fluid, ultimately leading the substance to become dust. As this occurs, the possibility of auto-ignition increases further.

Projection booth fires were not uncommon in the early decades of cinema if a film managed to be exposed to too much heat while passing through the projector's film gate, and several incidents of this type resulted in audience deaths by flame, smoke, or the resulting stampede. An accidental fire caused by the film jamming in the gate formed a significant plot point in the movie Cinema Paradiso (1988).

The year 1978 was particularly devastating for film archives when both the United States National Archives and Records Administration and George Eastman House had their nitrate film vaults auto-ignite. Eastman House lost the original camera negatives for 329 films, while the National Archives lost 12.6 million feet (3.84 million meters, or very roughly the distance between the two coasts of the continental United States) of newsreel footage. Because cellulose nitrate contains oxygen, nitrate fires are impossible to extinguish. The US Navy has produced an instructional movie about the safe handling and usage of nitrate films which includes footage of a full reel of nitrate film burning under water. The base is so flammable that intentionally igniting the film for test purposes is recommended in quantities no greater than one frame without extensive safety precautions. The smoke produced by burning nitrate film is highly toxic, containing several poisonous gases and can become lethal if inhaled enough.

Many nitrate films have been transferred in recent decades to safety stock, and original nitrate prints are generally stored separately to prevent a nitrate fire from destroying other non-nitrate films; the gas they release also affects the emulsion of safety film. Usually nitrate collections are even split up into several different fireproof rooms to minimize damage to an entire collection should a fire occur in one part. It is normal for a theater today to pass rigorous safety standards and precautions before being certified to run nitrate films; this includes a fireproof projection booth, fire chambers surrounding the feed and take-up reels, and several fire extinguishers built into the projector and aimed at the projector's film gate with a trigger released if the film ignites. Nitrate film is classified as "dangerous goods", which requires licenses for storage and transportation.

Nitrate film stock was used in every major film production before about 1951. Many silent films only survived because they were printed to 16 mm film, which did not use a nitrate base. A report published by the United States Library of Congress in September 2013 states that 70 percent of all American silent feature films are lost.

== Acetate ==
In the literature of photography "acetate" is used as a synonym for several chemicals: cellulose acetate, cellulose triacetate, cellulose diacetate, cellulose acetate propionate, and cellulose acetate butyrate. All have been used separately and in mixtures, to produce film base.

Despite the dangers of the nitrate film base being known practically since its development, it was used in virtually all major motion pictures prior to 1952, when Kodak completed a four-year conversion program to the sole manufacturing of acetate base film stocks. Kodak began working with acetate "safety film" as early as 1909, and started selling it in 1910 for 22 mm film. Acetate has always been used with 8 mm and 16 mm formats, as they were originally created for amateur home movie usage, and generally was used for most sub-35 mm formats to minimize risk to the general public. Several formats, such as 17.5 mm, which were often re-slit from 35 mm, were nitrate, however. One of Kodak's reasons for choosing 16 mm instead of 17.5 mm for a standard amateur format width was specifically to prevent nitrate re-slits from being used in home movies.

All motion picture camera negatives are now shot on acetate film because it is safer than nitrate but not as strong as polyester bases, which may damage the camera rather than the film should a jam occur. Acetate can also be spliced with film cement, while polyester can only be spliced with tape or an ultrasonic splicer, so polyester is hard to edit. Acetate film does not burn under intense heat, but rather melts, causing a bubbling burn-out effect — this can be seen simulated in films such as Persona (1966), Two-Lane Blacktop (1971), The Muppet Movie (1979) or Velvet Goldmine (1998). It can happen during a film screening when a frame becomes stuck in the projector's film gate. Acetate films are also subject to degradation over time. With exposure to heat, moisture, or acids, the acetyl groups are broken from their molecular bonds to the cellulose. The now free acetic acid is released into the air. Acetic acid is vinegar, and thus the characteristic smell of vinegar is detected. This is known as vinegar syndrome. As the degradation progresses the film base becomes brittle and shrinks.

== Polyester ==
In the literature of photography polyester is polyethylene terephthalate, which Kodak trade-named "ESTAR".

Polyester is the most recent film base to have been developed. It was first used for specialized photography applications in 1955, but it was only in the 1990s that it became overwhelmingly popular for motion picture prints. It is highly preferable for post-production, exhibition, and archival purposes because of its flexibility, strength, and stability. Its strength is sometimes also seen as a disadvantage, however, in that polyester-base films are so resistant to breakage that they are often more likely to break the film equipment should a jam, or extra tension, occur. Movie cameras therefore do not use this base for shooting the original camera negative, as it is vastly preferable, and less costly in time and money, for the film to break instead of the camera. In addition, cameras require a lap-spliceable triacetate base to allow the use of all of the negative stock.

PET film base can be ultrasonically spliced or by melting and joining the ends of two films together.

== Identifying a film base ==
There are several factors that can aid in identification of the film base of a roll of film. Many are not 100% conclusive, and it is best to use a selection of these to positively verify a film base.

- Printing along the edge of the film:
  - for older films, will often say "nitrate" or "safety" on it, however this text may print through from a negative or other intermediate stock.
  - may include a date code (Kodak print films prior to 2001) or an actual printed 4-digit year.
  - may include an emulsion number uniquely identifying the print stock (newer stocks, only)
- No Kodak film manufactured after 1951 is nitrate, and no film of any kind is polyester before 1955 (and which was initially introduced by DuPont, not Kodak—Kodak came much later, after DuPont had abandoned the market).
- Deterioration artifacts are distinct between nitrate (noxious nitric acid gas; amber discoloration; soft, sticky, or powdery film) and acetate (acetic acid gas, red or blue discoloration, shrinkage, brittleness, presence of bubbles or crystals).
- Polyester shows red and green interference colors when viewed through cross-polarized filters.
- A solution of diphenylamine and sulfuric acid will turn nitrate deep blue.
- Burning nitrate film will result in a bright yellow flame which almost completely consumes the film. (Note that nitrate film is considered a regulated material in many jurisdictions—intentionally burning it is strongly discouraged due to safety concerns and legal liability.)
- Nitrate film is soluble in a variety of solvents - namely methyl alcohol, ethyl, and ether.
- Float testing of the specific gravity of the base in trichloroethylene should cause nitrate to sink, acetate to float, and polyester to remain around the middle. However, this can be complicated by impurities and deterioration factors.
- Light aimed through the side of a roll of film will shine through if it is polyester, but will not if it is acetate.
- Polyester film is very strong and hard to tear off, unlike acetate.
