= Film synchronizer =

Physical film editing tool

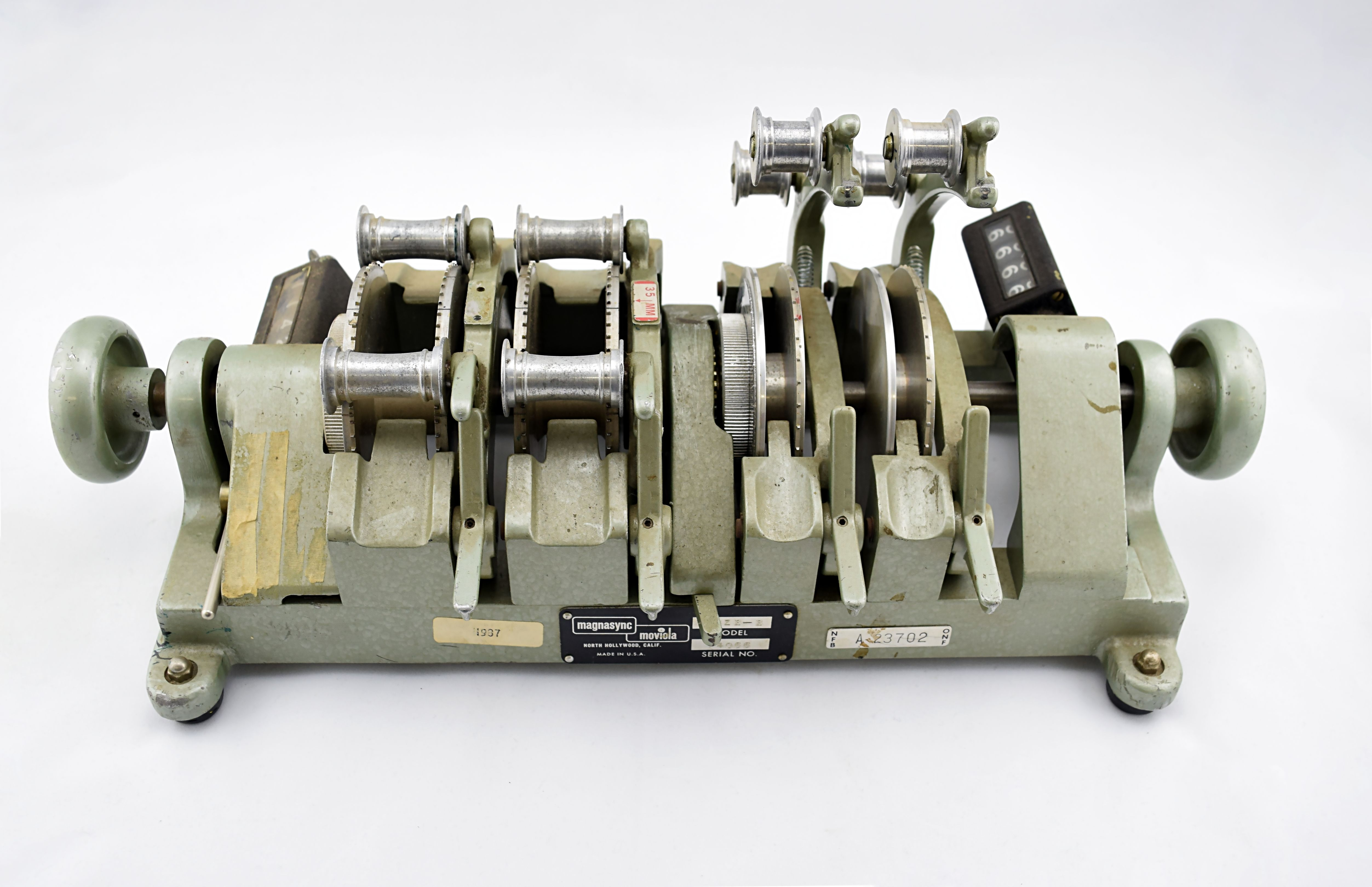
Moviola SYBZB-B synchronizer.

A film synchronizer is a device used in the editing phase of filmmaking.

Film synchronizers generally have 1 to 8 "gang(s)", or slots through which film can be threaded. Each gang consists of a group of large diameter sprockets on a common shaft. A rotating knob on the front, which moves the threaded film through the gangs, operates the synchronizer's movement. At the same time, there is a mechanical numerical counter which records the amount of film that has passed through the gangs. The unit may have a counter that counts the number of frames, or the length of the footage. The entire purpose of the film synchronizer is to ensure that the film is in "sync" with other reels of film when it is hand-cranked through the gangs. The film editor may have a soundtrack on one gang, which can be read with an audio amplifier.

The synchronizer is used in conjunction with several other devices on what is called the editing "bench". The film synchronizer is specifically used to track the length of a reel of film.

Both 16 mm and 35 mm versions exist, as well as versions with both 16 mm and 35 mm sprockets geared together so that the same number of frames are transported on each section.
