= Film splicer =

Machine to join together pieces of movie film

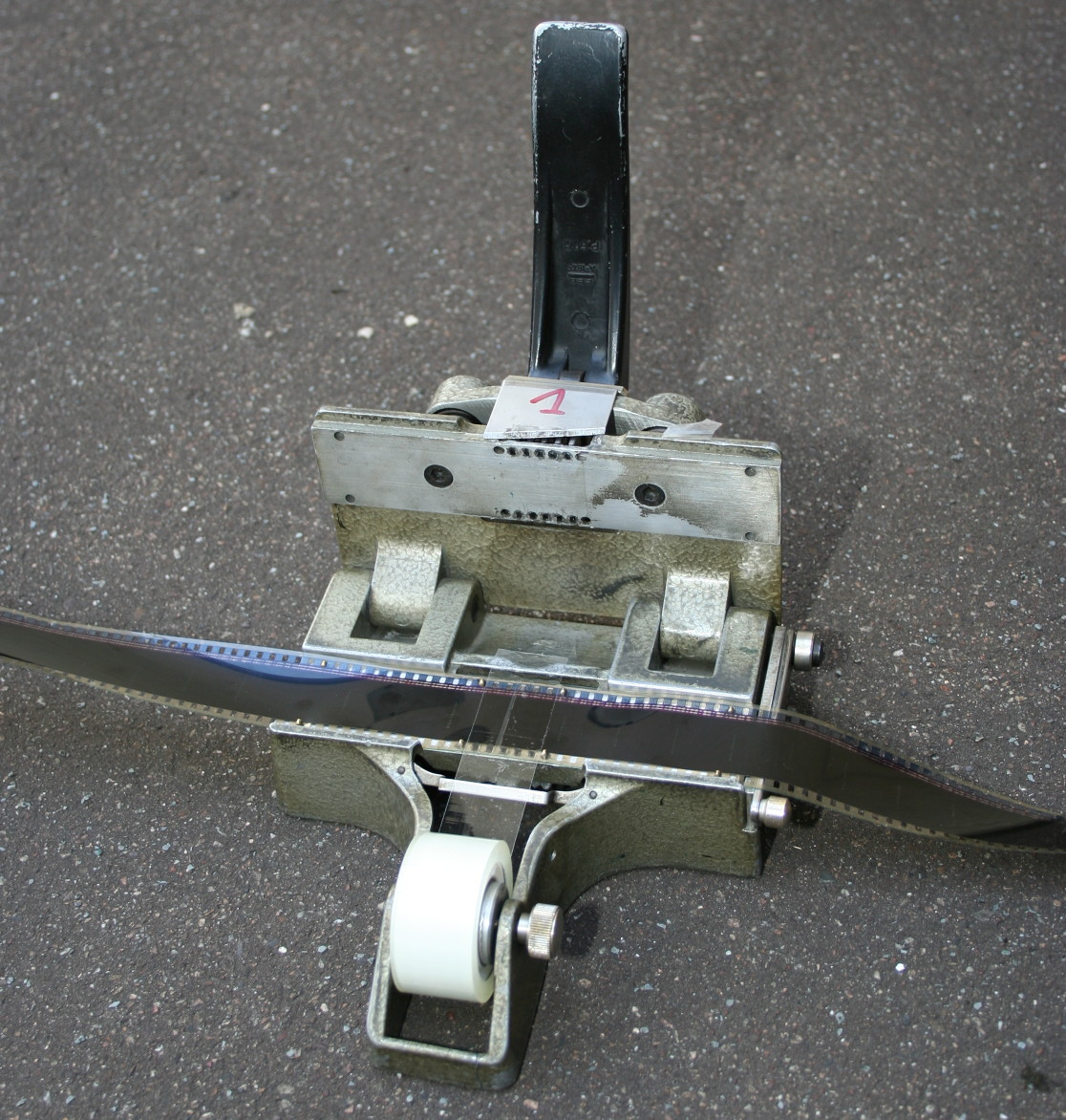
A Catozzo tape splicer for 35 mm film

A film splicer (also called a film joiner, usually in Europe) is a device which can be used to physically join lengths of photographic film. It is mostly used in film motion pictures. The units are made in various types depending on the usage: Single-8, Super 8 film, 16mm, 9,5 mm, 35mm and 70mm. Used in film editing to make a cut (transition).

== Cement splicers ==
Cement splicers join films together by using a chemical called film cement which is made of film base dissolved in a solvent. The photographic emulsion is removed from the area to be joined and the base of the other end is brought into contact with it.

Film editors use a version with a very small overlaps at the top and bottom of the picture frame to edit film negatives, although units with a longer overlap are preferred for projection release prints.

These can only be used with acetate, triacetate and nitrate films. Polyester film, such as that used for currently produced prints, will not bond with standard film cement.

== Tape splicers ==
Here a piece of thin transparent adhesive tape is used to join the two ends. The tape may be pre-perforated for the film perforations, or the splicer may make perforations as the splice is made (this type of splicer is sometimes referred to as guillotine splicer).

Tape splicers can be used on most types of film. This is the most popular way to join polyester prints in theaters.

== Ultrasonic splicers ==
These splicers use an ultrasonic signal to melt the film together. They are generally used with polyester film, and are used in splicing microfilm as the splice will not break down over time as a tape splice might.

== Thermal paper splicers ==
Used in film processing labs to join film into large rolls before processing. These use a plastic coated tab to make the splice. The tab is heated and the plastic melts slightly, bonding to the film. The tabs are often printed with a number or bar code to identify the film after processing.

== See also ==
Splicing is sometimes used to describe the technique of compositing used in digital film-making which is used to combine visual elements such as actors onto a virtual background.
