= Replication =

Replication may refer to:

== Science ==
- Replication (scientific method), one of the main principles of the scientific method, a.k.a. reproducibility
  - Replication (statistics), the repetition of a test or complete experiment
  - Replication crisis
- Self-replication, the process in which an entity (a cell, virus, program, etc.) makes a copy of itself
  - DNA replication or DNA synthesis, the process of copying a double-stranded DNA molecule
    - Semiconservative replication, mechanism of DNA replication
  - Viral replication, the process by which viruses produce copies of themselves
- Replication (metallography), the use of thin plastic films to duplicate the microstructure of a component
- Psychedelic replication, reproductions of the perceptual effects of psychedelic drugs
- Self-replicating machines

== Computing ==
- Replication (computing), the use of redundant resources to improve reliability, fault-tolerance, or performance
- Replication (optical media), the manufacture of CDs and DVDs by means other than burning writable discs

== See also ==
- Replicator (disambiguation)
