= Cellulose triacetate =

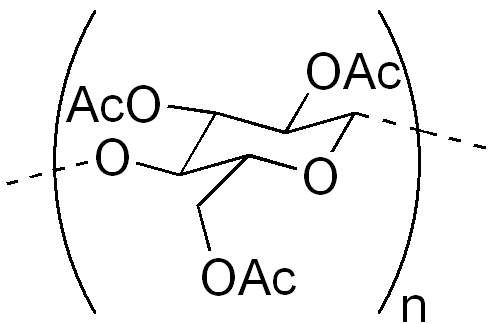

Names
- Other names 2,3,6-Tri-O-acetyl cellulose; cellulose triacetate polymer; triacetylcellulose

Identifiers
CAS Number	9012-09-3
ChemSpider	none
ECHA InfoCard	100.115.198
CompTox Dashboard (EPA)	DTXSID30892177

Properties
Chemical formula	variable
Molar mass	variable
- Except where otherwise noted, data are given for materials in their standard state (at 25 °C [77 °F], 100 kPa). verify (what is ?) Infobox references

Cellulose triacetate, triacetate, CTA or TAC is a chemical compound produced from cellulose and a source of acetate esters, typically acetic anhydride. Triacetate is commonly used for the creation of fibres and film base. It is chemically similar to cellulose acetate. Its distinguishing characteristic is that in triacetate, at least "92 percent of the hydroxyl groups are acetylated." During the manufacture of triacetate, the cellulose is completely acetylated; whereas in normal cellulose acetate or cellulose diacetate, it is only partially acetylated. Triacetate is significantly more heat resistant than cellulose acetate.

== History ==
Triacetate, whose chemical formula is [C_{6}H_{7}O_{2}(OOCCH_{3})_{3}]_{n}, was first produced commercially in the U.S. in 1954 by Celanese Corporation. Eastman Kodak was a manufacturer of CTA until March 15, 2007. For almost 3 years, Mitsubishi Rayon Co. Ltd. was the only manufacturer. In 2010, Eastman Chemical announced a 70% increase in cellulose triacetate output at its Kingsport, Tennessee, manufacturing site to meet the increasing demand for the chemical's use as an intermediate in the production of polarized films for liquid crystal displays.

== Production ==
Triacetate is derived from cellulose by acetylating cellulose with acetic acid and/or acetic anhydride. Acetylation converts hydroxyl groups in cellulose to acetyl groups, which renders the cellulose polymer much more soluble in organic solvents. The cellulose acetate is dissolved in a mixture of dichloromethane and methanol for spinning. As the filaments emerge from a spinneret, the solvent is evaporated in warm air, in a process known as dry spinning, leaving a fibre of almost pure triacetate.

A finishing process called S-Finishing or surface saponification is sometimes applied to acetate and triacetate fabrics using a sodium hydroxide solution. This removes part or all of the acetyl groups from the surface of the fibres leaving them with a cellulose coating. This reduces the tendency for the fibres to acquire a static charge.

== Applications ==
=== As a fibre ===
Triacetate fibres have a crenate cross section.

==== Characteristics ====
- Shrink resistant
- Wrinkle resistant
- Easily washable
- Often washable at high temperatures
- Maintains creases and pleats well

==== Usage scenarios ====
Triacetate is particularly effective in clothing where crease or pleat retention is important, such as skirts and dresses.

In the 1980s triacetate was also used with polyester to create shiny tracksuits. The fabric was smooth and shiny on the outside and soft and fleecy on the inside.

==== General care tips ====
- Ironable up to 200 °C
- Pleated garments are best hand laundered. Most other garments containing 100% triacetate can be machine washed and dried
- Articles containing triacetate fibres require little special care due mainly to the fibre's stability at high temperatures

=== As a film ===
==== Characteristics ====
- Resistant to grease, oil, aromatic hydrocarbons, and most common solvents
- Films have hard glossy surfaces
- Excellent optical clarity
- High dielectric constant
- Easily laminated, coated, folded, and die-cut
- Cellulose acetate film prone to degradation known as vinegar syndrome

==== Usage scenarios ====
- Polarizer films for LCD projectors
- Specialized overhead projector transparencies
- Specialized photographic film
- Motion picture film
- Production of animation cels
- Packaging
- Face screens

=== As a semipermeable membrane ===
==== Usage scenarios ====
- Water purification through reverse osmosis. The membrane may consist of a blend of cellulose acetate, diacetate and triacetate.

== See also ==
- Cellulose acetate
- Vinegar syndrome
- Rayon
