= Cellulose acetate butyrate =

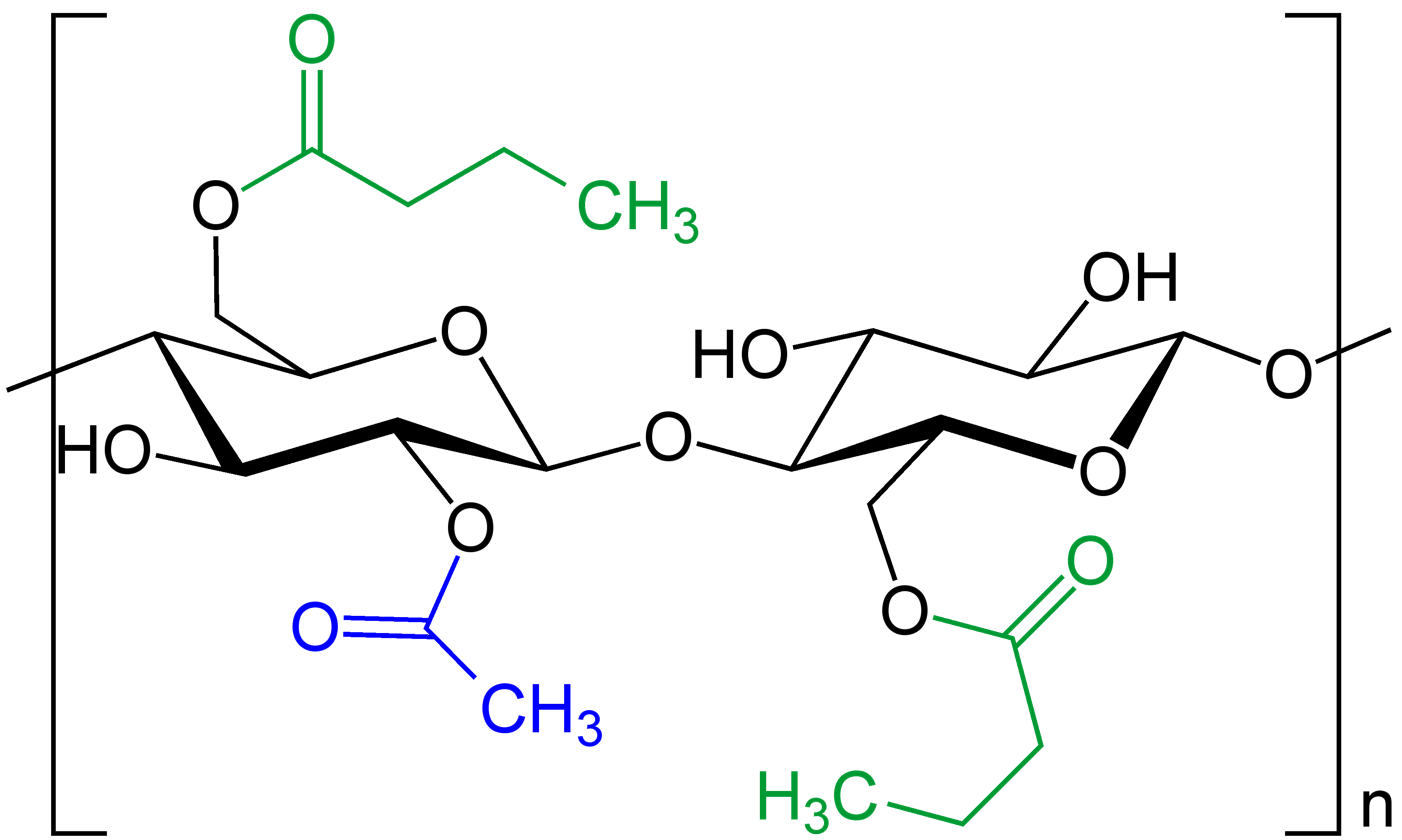
- Simplified representation of cellulose acetate butyrate with acetyl (blue) and butyryl (green) groups highlighted. The distribution of these ester groups can vary within the polymer chain.

Identifiers
CAS Number	9004-36-8
ECHA InfoCard	100.130.734
CompTox Dashboard (EPA)	DTXSID60894649

Properties
Appearance	White solid
Odor	Odorless
Melting point	127–205 °C (261–401 °F; 400–478 K)
Solubility in water	Negligible
- Except where otherwise noted, data are given for materials in their standard state (at 25 °C [77 °F], 100 kPa). Infobox references

Cellulose acetate butyrate (CAB) is a mixed ester thermoplastic derivative of cellulose acetate that contains both acetate and butyrate functional groups. It has improved weathering resistance and lower moisture absorption compared to cellulose acetate. The exact properties of a CAB compound is determined by the composition of butyrate vs acetate functional groups.

CAB is commonly used as a binder or additive in coatings. CAB is widely used for tool handles, due to its toughness and resistance to oil and gasoline. Tools with CAB handles can begin to outgas unpleasant butyric acid odors with age, which one manufacturer combats by adding vanilla scent to the plastic. Another usage of CAB is the production of rigid gas-permeable contact lenses.

Cellulose Acetate Butyrate (CAB) is a cellulose ester derived from cellulose and modified with acetate and butyrate groups. It is valued for its good weatherability, transparency, toughness, chemical resistance, moisture resistance, and compatibility with coatings and polymers.
