= Image Permanence Institute =

American non-profit research center

The Image Permanence Institute (IPI) is a university-based, non-profit research laboratory devoted to scientific research in the preservation of visual and other forms of recorded information. It is the world's largest independent laboratory with this specific scope. IPI was founded in 1985 through the combined efforts and sponsorship of the Rochester Institute of Technology and the Society for Imaging Science and Technology. Funding for IPI's preservation research and outreach efforts has come mainly from the National Endowment for the Humanities, the Institute of Museum and Library Services, and the Andrew W. Mellon Foundation. Additional funding comes from generous donations made by corporate supporters. IPI provides information, consulting services, practical tools and preservation technology to libraries, archives, and museums worldwide. The imaging and consumer preservation industries also use IPI’s consulting, testing and educational services.

Areas of Research and Expertise:

- The nature of photographic images and other forms of print media
- Information and technical support for the archival and photographic conservation profession
- Sustainable practices in environmental management and preservation
- The stability of imaging and information media and digital print preservation
- Development of ISO Standards for imaging media and preservation

Mission:

The Image Permanence Institute (IPI) is a recognized world leader in the development and deployment of sustainable practices for the preservation of images and cultural property. IPI accomplishes this through a balanced program of research, education, products and services that meet the needs of individuals, companies, and institutions.

Awards:

IPI and its staff have been recognized for their work through various industry and civic awards, including:

- Technical Achievement Award from the Academy of Motion Picture Arts and Sciences (1997)
- Fuji Gold Medal from the Society of Motion Picture and Television Engineers (1998)
- Preservation Publication Award from the Society of American Archivist (1999)
- Silver Light Award for Career Achievement in the Preservation of Moving Images from Association of Moving Image Archivists to James Reilly (2002)
- Certificate of recognition awarded to Dr. Peter Adelstein by the International Imaging Industry Association for his contributions to international standards (2003)
- HP Image Award awarded to James M. Reilly for outstanding contributions and devotion to the field of image preservation and permanence (2007)

Education and Outreach Activities:

- Seminars, workshops, and talks in IPI areas of expertise
- Advice and consultations on preservation and sustainable practice
- Internships
- Print Publications
- Informational Websites and E-newsletters
