= Cellulose diacetate =

Chemical compound

Identifiers
CAS Number	9035-69-2
ChemSpider	none
CompTox Dashboard (EPA)	DTXSID901010912

Properties
Chemical formula	variable
Molar mass	variable
- Except where otherwise noted, data are given for materials in their standard state (at 25 °C [77 °F], 100 kPa). Infobox references

Cellulose diacetate, sometimes called diacetate, is a synthetic polymer made by treating cellulose with acetic acid. It consists of two acetyl functional groups on each unit of D-anhydroglucopyranose of the cellulose molecule. It was first developed in the United States.

It is fragile since it is based on cellulose. When cellulose diacetate deteriorates, it shrinks and releases acetic acid causing vinegar syndrome.

Cellulose diacetate has been used to make fabrics, membranes, filaments, and many consumer products. From 1922 to 1957 it was used to make film stock, mainly in smaller formats such as 8 mm, 16 mm, 35 mm, and 70 mm. It has also been used in seed coating applications.

In photography, a film substrate made from cellulose diacetate is called safety film.

Cellulose diacetate is hydrophilic and biodegradable.

== See also ==
- Cellulose acetate
- Cellulose triacetate
