= Photograph conservator =

Professional who examines photographs

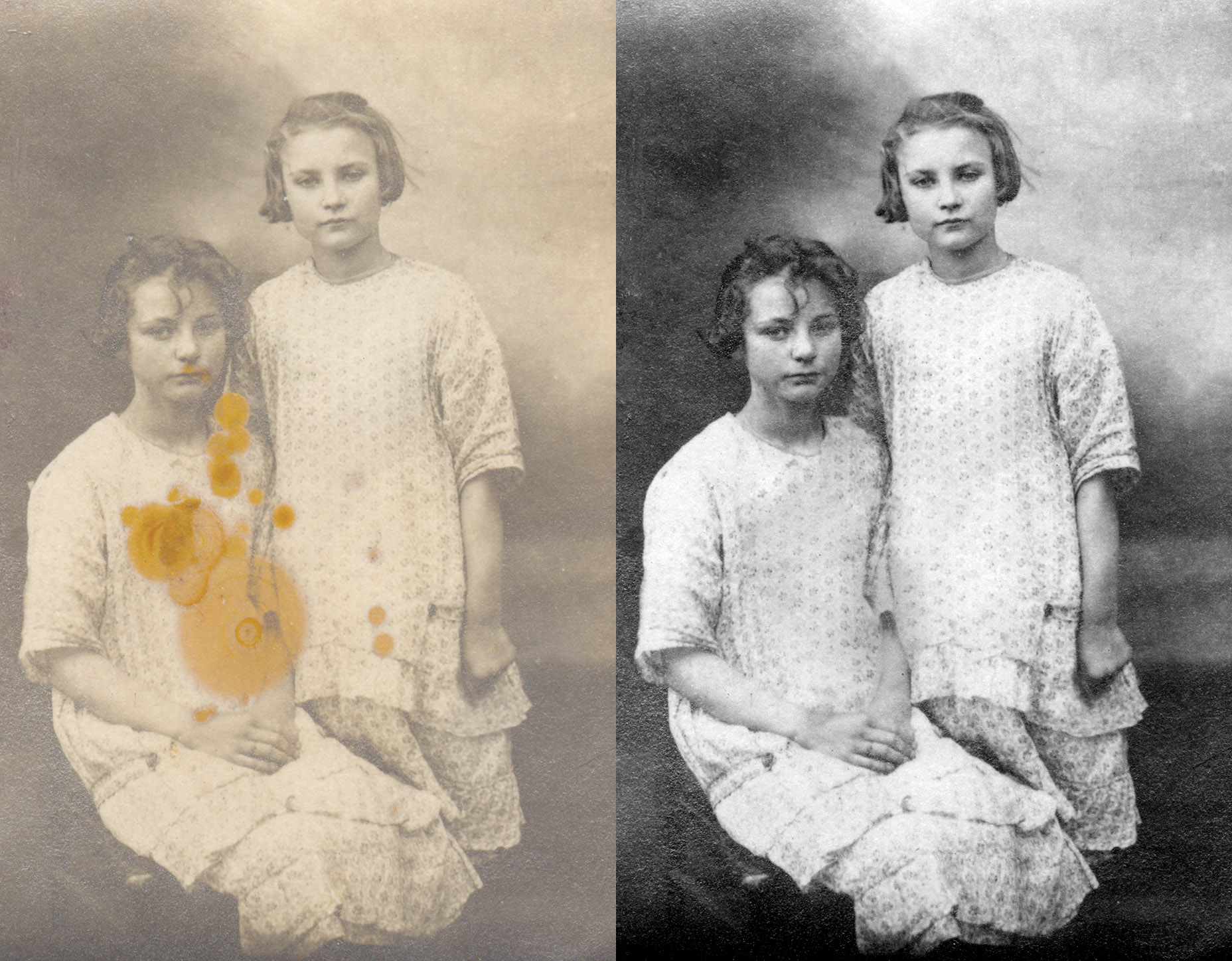
Anna and Germaine Sierens ca. 1924. Photo restoration by Michel Vuijlsteke.

A photograph conservator is a professional who examines, documents, researches, and treats photographs, including documenting the structure and condition of art works through written and photographic records, monitoring conditions of works in storage and exhibition and transit environments. This person also performs all aspects of the treatment of photographs and related artworks with adherence to the professional Code of Ethics.

== Responsibilities ==
Responsibilities of a Photograph Conservator vary from institution to institution, however there are some critical functions that all conservators must perform in their roles as protectors of cultural heritage. Preventive conservation, examination and documentation, research, and treatment are core functions at the center of every photograph conservator's responsibilities.

=== Preventive conservation ===
Preventive Conservation is a rather new specialty in the field and is in response to the need conservators feel for preserving objects post-treatment. As Barbara Appelbaum states, "The fact that conservators feel responsible for preserving object forever is noble, but, practically speaking, unrealistic." Preventive conservation shifts the burden of preservation and protection onto measures including control of environmental factors such as temperature and relative humidity, light levels, and various contaminants. It also includes integrated pest management and emergency preparedness. All of these steps should be taken for each object before and after treatment, or in some cases in the place of treatment. The Photograph Conservator should be working on preventive conservation each day, as it is one of the most important ways to preserve objects when treatment isn't practical or necessary.

==== Environmental controls ====
Control of relative humidity and temperature is critical in the preservation of photographs. "Heat can accelerate deterioration and high relative humidity provides the moisture necessary to promote harmful chemical reactions in materials and, with high temperature encourages mold growth and insect activity" according to the Northeast Document Conservation Center.

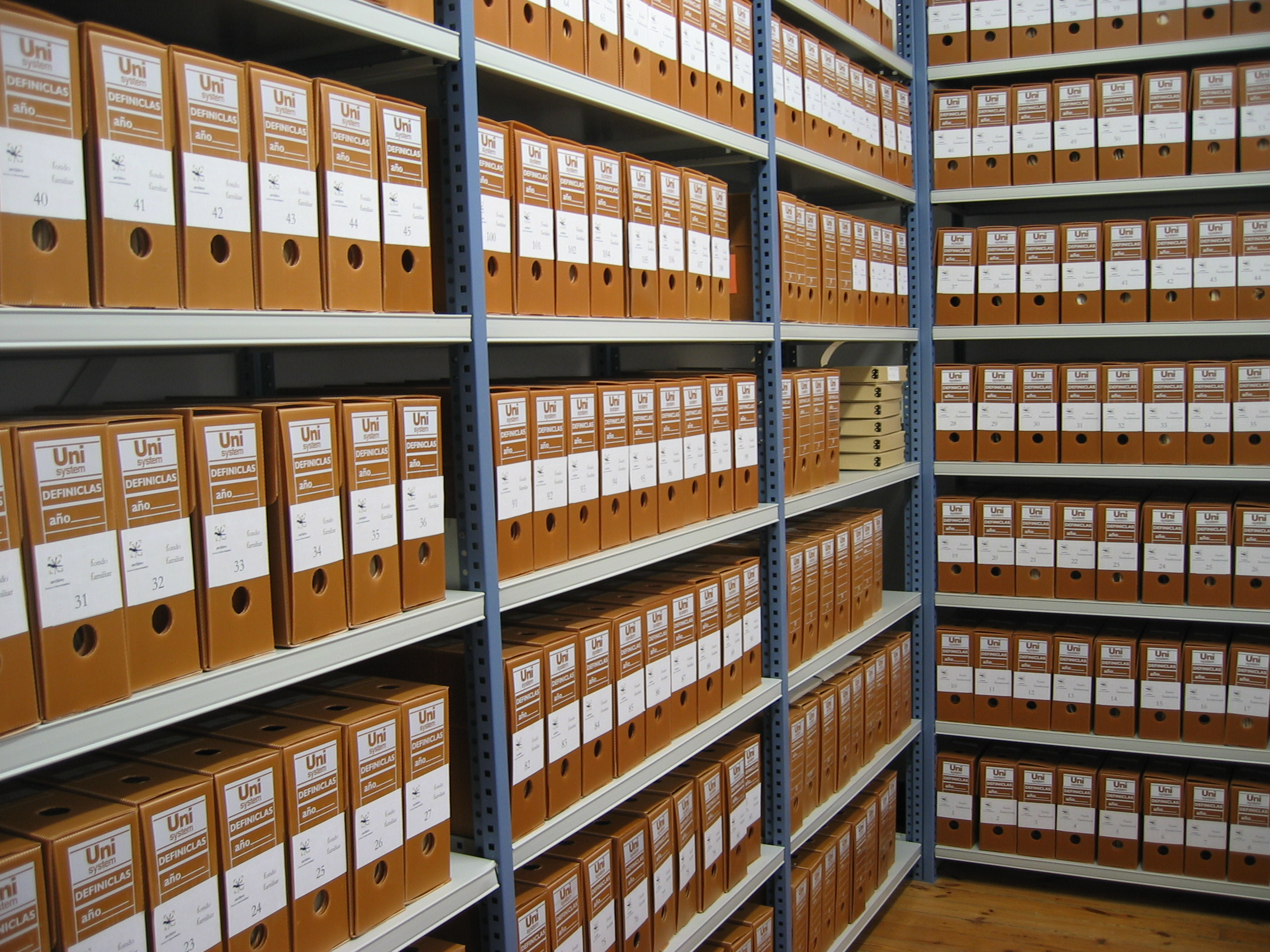
A prime example of proper archive storage and of archival friendly boxes.

Proper storage can protect photographs from fluctuations in relative humidity and temperature and/or seasonal changes. Photographic prints and negatives are best stored in individual paper or plastic enclosures. Note that paper enclosures must pass the PAT test or Photographic Activity Test in order to be deemed safe for storage of photographic materials. Once the photographs are in their individual enclosures they must be boxed in archival quality boxes. Horizontal storage is usually recommended over vertical storage, as is storing photographs of similar size together to avoid abrasions or misplacing the smaller items. Negatives, which includes black and white or color negatives, slides, lantern slides, collodion wet and dry plate negatives, and silver gelatin wet and dry plate negatives should be stored upright and vertically along their longest edge. Padded boxes with dividers are often necessary as you do not want two glass plate negatives to touch each other. When packing the archival quality boxes, make sure to not pack them too heavy and label them accordingly. Scrapbooks and albums provide a particular challenge to conservators because they often contain a variety of components and media. They should not be stored with other archival collections if it can be avoided. Scrapbooks can either be digitally reproduced or if the original is deemed important enough, can be wrapped in archival quality paper or housed in a custom fitted box.

==== Emergency preparedness and response ====
The AAM, or American Alliance of Museums, defines an emergency response plan as "a series of written policies and procedures that prevent or minimize damage resulting from disasters (either man made or natural) and help a museum recover." The required elements of such a plan are as follows: tailored to the institutions current facilities and specific circumstances, covers all threats/risks relevant to the institution, addresses staff, visitors, structures, and collections, includes evacuation plans for people, specifies how to protect, evacuate or recover collections in the event of a disaster, and delegates responsibility for implementation. A Photography Conservator would have a vital role to play in the emergency response plan at their institution. It would be their responsibility to detail the needs of the photography collection and the ways to recover that collection in case of a disaster. It is widely recommended that the staff partake in monthly training to go over the emergency response plan in order to ensure that each staff member, including the photograph conservator, knows their role in case of an emergency.

=== Examination and documentation ===
Examination is defined by the act of looking at something closely and carefully or a close and careful study of something. This would be a crucial duty for all conservators, including Photograph Conservators. Barbara Appelbaum explains that "the contrast between the first impression of an object-which is more or less the impression of the ordinary viewer- and the view that a conservator takes during an examination is a significant one." The first step of an examination is examination of an object with one's eye with a bright light, sometimes with the help of magnification or other viewing aids like binoculars. Tactile observations are also critical, and in some cases senses of smell and hearing yield useful information as well, as tapping on a glass plate negative for example can help identify significant discontinuities.

It can be argued that documentation is the most important task a conservator carries out. Every step of the process must be fully documented by a conservator. The National Park Service recommends that all conservation treatment should be documented in writing. They should also include visual representations such as photographs, drawings, analytical results, spectra, and digital images. The documentation should be kept in hard copy and in digital files appended to the Collections Database System used by the museum. Documentation is important for the following reasons

- Conservation documentation is a written and visual report of the work that is done. It provides the park staff with detailed information on the condition of the object, including how it has been altered, what parts are composed of original material, and what has been added or removed during previous treatments or restorations.
- It serves as a permanent record of the treatment procedures performed and the materials and methods used.
- It spells out the understanding reached between the curatorial staff and the conservator on the treatment, including the extent and type of any stabilization or restoration treatment.
- It provides information that will help future conservators to assess the condition of an object and devise further treatment.
- It makes it possible to assess the success or failure of treatment methods and materials over a long period of time.
- It may last longer than the object itself and become the only record.

=== Research ===
Photograph conservators must do thorough research before any treatment can take place. This is often the legacy that conservators leave behind, their documentation, research, and treatment. New techniques and less harsh treatments are being discovered all the time by professionals in the field. The Getty Conservation Institute is currently researching methods for characterization of photographs and photographic material. The study is explained as, "both qualitative and quantitative analysis of photographs and photographic material in order to facilitate identification of photographic processes, and to develop a quantitative methodology for analysis of photographic material. The analytical techniques currently being used in this research are:

- X-ray fluorescence spectrometry (XRF)
- Fourier-transform infrared spectrometry (FTIR)
- Enzyme-linked immunosorbent assay (ELISA)
- inductively coupled plasmas mass spectrometry (ICP–MS)
- environmental scanning electron microscopy (ESEM)
- neutron activation analysis (NAA)"

=== Treatment ===
Treatment is defined by the American Institute for Conservation as, "the deliberate alteration of the chemical and/or physical aspects of cultural property, aimed primarily at prolonging its existence. Treatment may consist of stabilization and/or restoration." Stabilization is meant to maintain the integrity of cultural property and minimize deterioration and restoration is meant to return cultural property to a known or assumed state, often through addition of non original material.

Treating photographs is not all about the aesthetic of the image; it also has to do with the photograph's long-term survival. Of course a photographs conservator would want the image to look as pleasing as possible, but that is not the primary motive behind conservation treatment. Photograph preservation is concerned with treating original photographic material and not the digital copy of that image, although making reproductions of images digitally is a treatment plan used by many conservators. This allows digital photograph restoration and study and preservation of the image and information that image contains, without the original being damaged further. However this is not a replacement for the original photograph as digital scans and copies can easily become obsolete.

A successful treatment was carried out on a broken glass plate interpositive of Abraham Lincoln taken in 1860, at the George Eastman House. This treatment included using materials that stabilized the glass and emulsion and involved research in innovative new methods.

== Skills and knowledge ==
Photograph conservators need to possess a vast knowledge of photographic processes and deterioration of those materials. Conservators should have experience in:

- examination procedures to determine the materials, method of manufacture, and properties of objects or structures and the causes and extent of deterioration or alteration
- scientific analysis and research to identify historic and artistic methods and materials of fabrication, and to evaluate the efficacy and appropriateness of materials and procedures of conservation
- documentation procedures to record the condition of an object or site at a specific time, or before, during, and after treatment, and to outline treatment methods and materials in detail
- treatment, including interventive procedures, as well as passive measures to stabilize an artifact or retard its deterioration
- restoration to bring a deteriorated or damaged object or structure closer to a previous or assumed appearance or function
- advising on procedures for the safe exhibition and travel of cultural materials.

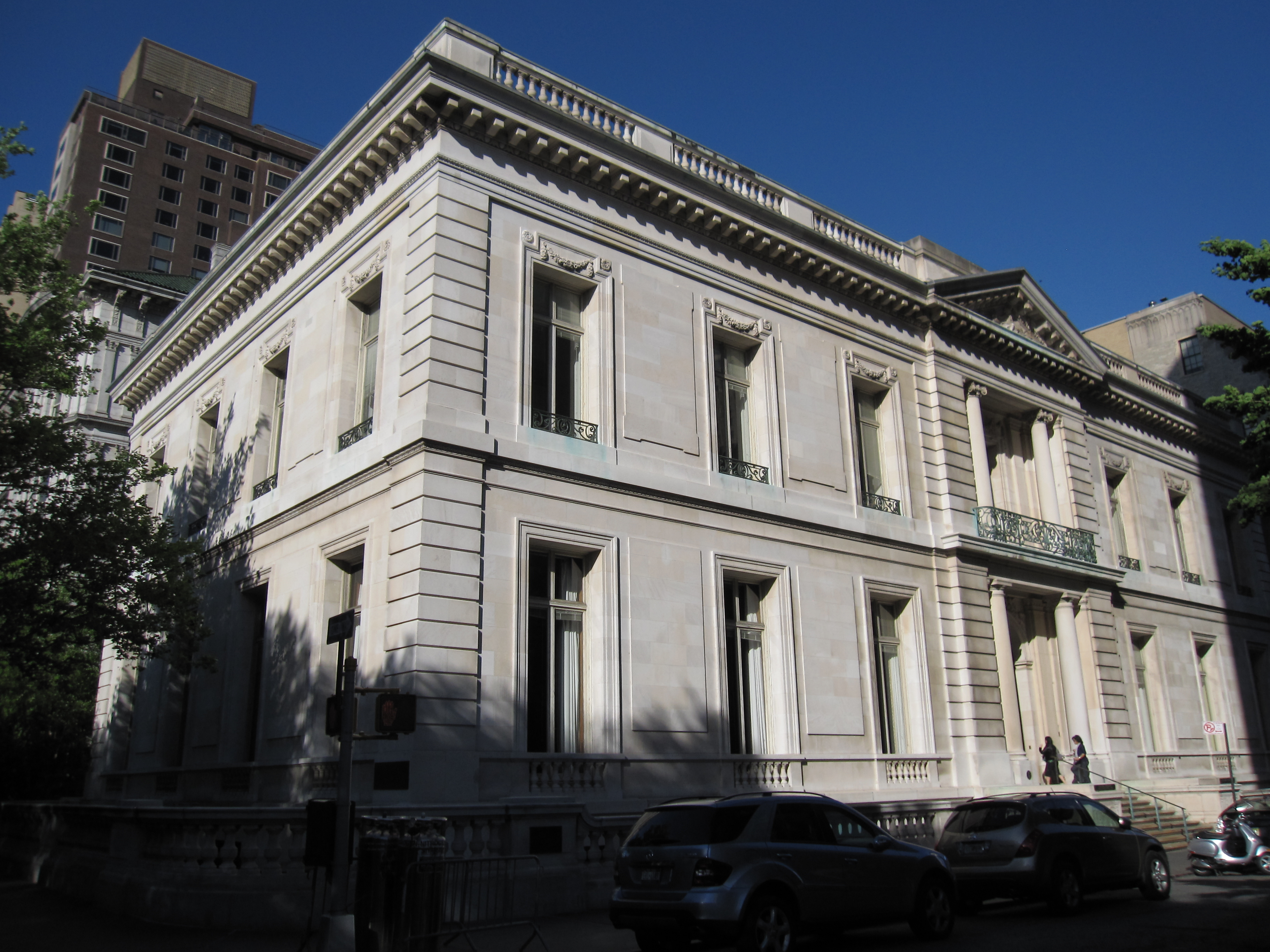
James B Duke House, where the Institute of Fine Arts, New York University is housed.

== Education ==
Paths to becoming a conservator vary but usually include, a graduate degree in conservation or historic preservation with a certificate in or diploma in conservation as well as post graduate fellowships. Study of a foreign language, formal course work in drawing, painting, photography etc., professional experience, and a personal interview and portfolio are sometimes required. A few PhD programs do exist for those that wish to further their studies of conservation sciences. Some programs in North America include:

- Buffalo State College
- Fleming College
- NYU/IFA
- Queens University
- Winterthur/University of Delaware

== Well known photograph conservators and projects ==
Some of the most well known Photograph Conservators in the world are:

- Paul Messier who received his Masters of Arts and certificate of advanced study in the conservation of works on paper and photographs from the art conservation program at the State University of New York College at Buffalo. He is an independent conservator of photographs in Boston, MA and founded his own studio there in 1994. Paul was recently appointed head of the newly formed Lens Media Lab at Yale University.
- Gawain Weaver who received a B.A. in Art History and Chemistry from Sonoma State University, and an M.A. in Art History and diploma in Conservation from the Institute of Fine Arts, New York University. He now resides in Northern California where he teaches, consults, and works as a photograph conservator. Gawain Weaver is a Professional Associate of the American Institute for Conservation and abides by the AIC Code of Ethics.
- Katharine Whitman who received her bachelor's degrees in biology from Michigan State University and fine art photography from the University of Oregon. She earned her master's degree in paper conservation at Queen's University in Kingston, Ontario in 2005. Katharine Whitman is currently the photograph conservator at the Art Gallery of Ontario in Toronto.

== Areas of specialty ==
Photograph conservators can specialize in:

- paper
- plastic film
- glass
- metal
- composite objects including wood, paper prints, and album/book structures

== Professional organizations ==
- American Institute for Conservation of Historic and Artistic Works
- The Photographic Materials Group of the American Institute for Conservation
- International Council of Museums- Committee for Conservation
- International Institute for Conservation of Historic and Artistic Works
- Canadian Association for Conservation

== See also ==
- Objects conservator
- Paintings conservator
- Conservation scientist
- Conservation technician
- Conservation and restoration of photographs
