= Friedrich Wilhelm Murnau Foundation =

German film preservation organization

- Friedrich-Wilhelm-Murnau-Stiftung
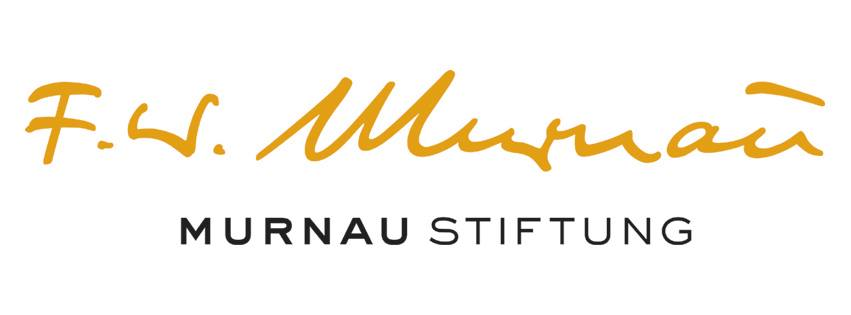
- Named after: Friedrich Wilhelm Murnau
- Formation: 1966; 60 years ago
- Type: Film Foundation
- Legal status: Active
- Purpose: Archiving, maintaining, restoring, and educating the public on German cinema.
- Location: Murnaustraße 6, 65189 Wiesbaden, Germany
- Coordinates: 50.066182°N 8.249061°E
- Services: Archival access, restoration, film and political education.
- Official language: German
- Managing Director: Ernst Szebedits
- Key people: Christian Sommer (Chairman of the Board of Trustees); MinR'in Ulrike Schauz (Deputy Chairwoman of the Board of Trustees) representative of the Federal Government Commissioner for Culture and the Media; MinR'in Ulrike Kiesche, as a representative of the Hessian Ministry of Science and the Arts for the Conference of Ministers of Education of the Länder (KMK); Antonio Exacoustos; Alfred Holighaus; Johannes Klingsporn; Daniel Zuta
- Awards: Best Archive Restoration; 2015 The Cabinet of Dr. Caligari
- Website: https://www.murnau-stiftung.de/

The Friedrich Wilhelm Murnau Foundation (German: Friedrich-Wilhelm-Murnau-Stiftung [ˈfʁiːdʁɪç ˈvɪlhɛlm ˈmʊʁnaʊ ˈʃtɪftʊŋ]), based in Wiesbaden, was founded in 1966 to preserve and curate a collection of the works of Friedrich Wilhelm Murnau as well as a collection of other German films totaling to about 6,000 produced between 1890 and 1960.

== History ==
The foundation was founded in 1966 by the Spitzenorganisation der Filmwirtschaft out of fear that classic German cinema's original stock, and the rights to these films, would be sold off internationally. The stock was originally owned by Bertelsmann. The foundation maintains about 80% of Germany's Nazi-era films and acts as a gate keeper for public access to these films via archives and curated public screenings.

As an archive and rights holder the Murnau Foundation curates a significant part of Germany’s movie heritage. Its endowment is the movie stock, which comprises copies and material as well as rights from the former production companies UFA, Decla, Universum-Film, Bavaria, Terra, Tobis and Berlin-Film. This inventory of more than 6,000 silent movies and sound films (feature films, documentaries, short movies and commercials) covers the period from the beginnings of motion pictures to the early 1960s, and includes movies by directors such as Fritz Lang, Ernst Lubitsch, Detlef Sierck, Helmut Käutner, and Friedrich Wilhelm Murnau, the namesake of the foundation. Titles include films like The Cabinet of Dr. Caligari (1920), Metropolis (1927), The Blue Angel (1930), The Three from the Filling Station (1930), Münchhausen (1943) and Große Freiheit Nr. 7 (1944).

=== Theaters ===
The foundation runs "the German Film House in a central location in the state capital of Hesse – Wiesbaden" as well as the "Murnau cinema theatre where films are shown to the public and a multi-function area where numerous events and exhibitions are held."

== Restorations and film stock ==
The foundation's most prominent film restoration was the 2010 re-release of Fritz Lang's Metropolis which was originally screened at the 60th Berlin International Film Festival. It has additionally restored, with financial support from the prior owners of their film stock, Bertelsmann, The Cabinet of Dr. Caligari which premiered "at the Berlinale in February 2014" which it won an award for best archive restoration in 2015 from FOCAL International. The foundation was also involved in the restoration of Fritz Lang's Destiny which had "faded and degraded almost beyond recognition." The foundation maintains about 80% of Germany's Nazi-era films (called "Vorbehaltsfilm" in German) referring to this collection of 40 films as "reserved" films which are "propagandistic productions created under Hitler, which may only be used for scientific evaluation in Germany and within the framework of political education." This collection includes the notorious Jud Süß, Kolberg and I Accuse.

== Criticism ==
The treatment of reserved films by the Murnau Foundation has been met with criticism. Critics accuse the foundation of misusing copyrights for film censorship and not for the intended purpose of copyright law where, they argue, the government should institute a ban through legislation instead. Unlike the FSK, there are no legal evaluations for the decisions of the Board of Trustees. Critics also point out the opaque process of deciding which films should be reserved, noting that there is no transparent criteria, the experts consulted are not publicized, and any reports used are not publicized. For instance, the film The Old and the Young King contains Nazi propaganda, however, it was allowed to be screened publicly. Additionally, the nature of the reserved film screenings has been criticized, since the only option is to view them with accompanying expert supervision, commentary, and discussion.

== See also ==
- Film preservation
- Conservation and restoration of film
- Lists of film archives
- Lost film
- Cinematheque
- Silent film
- Sound film
- Nazism and cinema
- Reichsfilmarchiv
- Antisemitism
- Racial antisemitism
- Racial policy of Nazi Germany
- Why We Fight
- Berlin International Film Festival
