= Paul Messier =

Paul Messier may refer to:

- Paul Messier (art conservator) (born 1962), art conservator
- Paul Messier (ice hockey) (born 1958), hockey player
