= Paul Messier (art conservator) =

Paul Arthur Messier
- Born: 1962 (age 63–64)
- Citizenship: United States
- Education: Vassar College; The State University of New York College at Buffalo
- Occupation: Art Conservator

Paul Arthur Messier (born 1962) is an art conservator and head of the Lens Media Lab at the Institute for the Preservation of Cultural Heritage, Yale University, New Haven, Connecticut, USA.

== Education ==
Messier received an A.B. cum laude in Art History from Vassar College in 1984 and a M.A. and C.A.S. in paper conservation from the Art Conservation Department of the State University of New York College at Buffalo in 1990.

== Career ==
Consulting with private and institutional collections worldwide, Messier served as a senior advisor for the Museum of Modern Art's Object|Photo initiative to characterize modernist photographs in its collection and is directing a program to establish a photograph conservation department at the State Hermitage Museum. In February 2015, he was named the inaugural head of the Lens Media Lab at Yale University's "Institute for the Preservation of Cultural Heritage."

The largest authenticity scandal in the fine art photography market, fraudulent prints attributed to Lewis Hine were exposed through his research in 1999. Other authentication research has focused on the work of Man Ray, Dorothea Lange and Charles-Edouard de Crespy le Prince among others.

Messier has assembled a reference collection of photographic papers that is considered unique in the world. Ongoing research on this collection has involved numerous partners including the Getty Conservation Institute the Museum of Modern Art, the Art Conservation Research Center at Carnegie Mellon University, the Department of Surface Metrology at Worcester Polytechnic Institute, the School of Electrical and Computer Engineering, Cornell University and the George Eastman House. His work to characterize photographic paper was described by ARTnews as advances that “will reduce fraud, influence the marketplace, and even revise art history.” The collection was purchased by Yale University as part of the formation of the Lens Media Lab.

In 1998 Messier founded the Electronic Media Group of the American Institute for Conservation (AIC). He was elected to the AIC board for two terms, serving from 2004-2010. While on the board his major initiatives included the publication of the AIC Guide to Digital Photography and Conservation Documentation (2008) the transfer of ConservationOnline and the ConservationDislist from Stanford University (2009), and the establishment of the Conservation Catalog Wiki (2009).

The New York Times called Paul Messier "the man when it comes to photography and paper restoration."
