= Conservation and restoration of photographs =

Study of the physical care and treatment of photographic materials

Water-damaged tintypes and album

The conservation and restoration of photographs is the study of the physical care and treatment of photographic materials. It covers both efforts undertaken by photograph conservators, librarians, archivists, and museum curators who manage photograph collections at a variety of cultural heritage institutions, as well as steps taken to preserve collections of personal and family photographs. It is an umbrella term that includes both preventative preservation activities such as environmental control and conservation techniques that involve treating individual items. Both preservation and conservation require an in-depth understanding of how photographs are made, and the causes and prevention of deterioration. Conservator-restorers use this knowledge to treat photographic materials, stabilizing them from further deterioration, and sometimes restoring them for aesthetic purposes.

While conservation can improve the appearance of a photograph, image quality is not the primary purpose of conservation. Conservators will try to improve the visual appearance of a photograph as much as possible, while also ensuring its long-term survival and adhering the profession's ethical standards. Photograph conservators also play a role in the field of connoisseurship. Their understanding of the physical object and its structure makes them uniquely suited to a technical examination of the photograph, which can reveal clues about how, when, and where it was made.

Photograph preservation is distinguished from digital or optical restoration, which is concerned with creating and editing a digital copy of the original image rather than treating the original photographic material. Photograph preservation does not normally include moving image materials, which by their nature require a very different approach. Film preservation concerns itself with these materials.

== Photographic processes ==
Physical photographs usually consist of three components: the final image material (e.g. silver, platinum, dyes, or pigments), the transparent binder layer (e.g. albumen, collodion, or gelatin) in which the final image material is suspended, and the primary support (e.g. paper, glass, metal, or plastic). These components affect the susceptibility of photos to damage and the preservation and conservation methods required. Photograph preservation and conservation are also concerned with the negatives from which most old photographic prints are made. Most negatives are either glass plate or film-based.

=== Timeline ===
1816: Heliography
The first person who succeeded in producing a paper negative of the camera image was Joseph Nicephore Niepce. He coated pewter plates with bitumen (an asphaltic varnish that hardens with exposure to light) and put them in a Camera Obscura. After exposure to sunlight for a long time, the parts that were exposed to light became hard and the parts that were not could be washed off with lavender oil.

1837: Daguerreotype
The daguerreotype process (named after Louis Jacques Mande Daguerre) produces a unique image, as there is no negative created. After coating a copper plate with light-sensitive silver iodide, the plate is exposed to an image for over 20 minutes and then treated with fumes from heated mercury. The longer the exposure to light, the more mercury fumes are adsorbed by the silver iodide. After the plate is washed with salt water, the image appears, reversed. This was the earliest photographic process to gain popularity in America. It was used until around 1860.

1839: Salt print
This was the dominant form of paper print until Albumen prints were introduced in 1850. Salt prints were made using both paper and glass negatives.

1841: Calotype
William Henry Fox Talbot invented the negative-positive system of photography commonly used today. He first developed the Talbotype, which used silver chloride to sensitize paper. After improving the process by using silver iodide, he renamed it Calotype. The process could produce many positive images, but they were not as sharp because they were printed on fibrous paper rather than glass.

1842: Cyanotype (Ferro-plusiate, Blue process)
This process forms blue-colored images through a reaction to iron salts. John Herschel studied it in order to reproduce his complicated math formulas and memos. Other processes that fall into this category include Kallitype, Vandyketype, and Platinum printing.

1850: Albumen print
This process, introduced by Louis Désiré Blanquart-Evrard, was the most common kind of print in the latter half of the nineteenth century. Beautiful sepia gradation images were created by using albumen and silver chloride. The surfaces of prints made with this process were glossy because of the egg whites which were layered heavily to prevent the originally thin prints from curling, cracking, or tearing easily. This type of print was especially common for studio portraits and landscape or stereoviews.

1851: Wet collodion process and Ambrotype
Frederick Scott Archer developed the wet collodion processes, which used a thick glass plate unevenly hand-coated with a collodion-based, light-sensitive emulsion. Collodion, which means ‘glue’ in Greek, is nitrocellulose dissolved in ether and ethanol. The Ambrotype, an adaptation of the wet collodion process, was developed by Archer and Peter W. Fry. It involved placing a dark background behind the glass so that the negative image would look positive, and was popular in America until around 1870.

1855: Gum printing
Orange colored dichromate has photosensitivity when it is mixed with colloids such as gum arabic, albumen, or gelatin. Using that feature, Alphonse Poitevin invented the gum printing process. It gained in popularity after 1898, and again in 1960s and 1970s because of its unique look.

1858: Tintype (also called Ferrotype and Melainotype)
In this photographic process the emulsion was painted directly onto a japanned (varnish finish) iron plate. it was much cheaper and sturdier than the Ambrotype and Daguerreotype.

1861: RGB additive color model
Applied physician James Clerk Maxwell made the first color photo by mixing red, green, and blue light.

1871: Gelatin dry plate
Richard L. Maddox discovered that gelatin could be a carrier for silver salts. By 1879, the gelatin dry plate had replaced the collodion wet plate. It was a revolutionary innovation in photography since it needed less light exposure, was usable when dry, meaning photographers no longer needed to pack and carry dangerous liquids, and could be standardized because it could be factory produced.

1873: Platinum printing (Platinotype)
William Willis patented platinum printing in Britain. The process rapidly spread and became a dominant method in Europe and America by 1894 since it had a visibly different color tone compared to albumen and gelatin silver prints.

Late 1880s: Gelatin silver print
This has been the major photograph printing process since the late 1880s up to the present. Prints consist of paper coated with an emulsion of silver halide in gelatin. The surface is generally smooth; under magnification, the print appears to sparkle.

1889: Kallitype
Dr. W. W. J. Nicol invented and refined the Kallitype. Vandyketype, or Single Kalliitype, is the simplest type of Kalltype and creates beautiful brown images.

1889: Film negatives
Cellulose nitrate film was developed by Eastman Kodak in 1889 and refined in 1903. It is made of silver gelatin on a cellulose nitrate base. The negatives are flammable and therefore can be dangerous. Nitrate sheet film was used widely though the 1930s, while nitrate roll film was used through the 1950s. The nitrate base was replaced with cellulose acetate in 1923. By 1937, Cellulose diacetate was used as the base, and beginning in 1947 Cellulose triacetate was used. Polyester film was introduced around 1960.

1935: Color photographs
Kodak introduced color film and transparencies in 1935. The first process was called Kodachrome. Ektachrome, introduced in the late 1940s, became equally popular. There are now a variety of color processes that use different materials; most consist of dyes (cyan, magenta, and yellow, each of which have different absorption peaks) suspended in a gelatin layer.

=== Photograph stability ===
Photograph stability refers to the ability of prints and film to remain visibly unchanged over periods of time. Different photographic processes yield varying degrees of stability. In addition, different materials may have dark-storage stability which differs from their stability in light.

Kodachrome
An extreme case with slides was stability under the intense light of projection. When stored in darkness, Kodachrome's long-term stability under suitable conditions is superior to other types of color film. Images on Kodachrome slides over fifty years old retain accurate color and density. Kodachrome film stored in darkness is largely responsible for excellent color footage of World War II, for example. It has been calculated that the yellow dye in Kodachrome, the least stable, would suffer a 20% loss of dye in 185 years. This is because developed Kodachrome does not retain unused color couplers. However, Kodachrome's color stability under bright light, especially during projection, is inferior to substantive slide films. Kodachrome's fade time under projection is about one hour, compared to Fujichrome's two and a half hours. Thus, old Kodachrome slides should be exposed to light only when copying to another medium.

Silver halide
Black-and-white negatives and prints made by the silver halide process are stable so long as the photographic substrate is stable. Some papers may yellow with age, or the gelatin matrix may yellow and crack with age. If not developed properly, small amounts of silver halide remaining in the gelatin will darken when exposed to light. In some prints, the black silver oxide is reduced to metallic silver with time, and the image takes on a metallic sheen as the dark areas reflect light instead of absorbing it. Silver can also react with sulfur in the air and form silver sulfide. A correctly processed and stored silver print or negative probably has the greatest stability of any photographic medium, as attested by the wealth of surviving historical black-and-white photographs.

Chromogenic
Chromogenic dye color processes include Type "R" and process RA-4 (also known as "type C prints"), process C-41 color negatives. and process E-6 color reversal (Ektachrome) film. Chromogenic processes yield organic dyes that are less stable than silver, and can also leave unreacted dye couplers behind during developing. Both factors may lead to color changes over time. The three dyes, cyan, magenta, and yellow, which make up the print may fade at different rates, causing a color shift in the print. Modern chromogenic papers such as Kodak Endura have achieved excellent stability, however, and are rated for 100 years in home display.

Dye destruction
Dye destruction prints are the most archival color prints, at least among the wet chemical processes, and arguably among all processes. The most well-known kind of dye destruction print is the Cibachrome, now known as Ilfochrome.

Ink jet
Some ink jet prints are now considered to have excellent stability, while others are not. Ink jet prints using dye-pigment mixtures are now common in photography, and often claim stability on par with chromogenic prints. However, these claims are based on accelerated aging studies rather than historical experience, because the technology is still relatively young.

== Types and causes of deterioration ==
There are two main types of deterioration found in photographic materials. Chemical deterioration occurs when the chemicals in the photograph or negative undergo reactions (either through contact with outside catalysts, or because the chemicals are inherently unstable) that damage the material. Physical or structural deterioration occurs when chemical reactions are not involved, and include abrasion and tearing.

Both types of deterioration are caused by three main factors: environmental storage conditions, inappropriate storage enclosures and repair attempts, and human use and handling. Chemical damage can also be caused by improper chemical processing. Different types of photographic materials are particularly susceptible to different types and causes of deterioration.

=== Environmental factors ===
- Temperature and humidity interact with one another and cause chemical and physical deterioration. High temperature and relative humidity, along with pollution, can cause fading and discoloration of silver images and color dyes. Higher temperatures cause faster deterioration: the rate of deterioration is approximately doubled with every temperature increase of 10 °C. Fluctuations in temperature and relative humidity are particularly damaging, as they also speed up chemical deterioration and can cause structural damage such as cracked emulsions and warped support layers.

- Too-high relative humidity can cause fading, discoloration and silver mirroring, and can cause binders to soften and become sticky, making photographs susceptible to physical damage. It can also cause photographs to adhere to frames and other enclosures.
- Too-low relative humidity can cause physical damage including desiccation, embrittlement, and curling.

- Pollution can include oxidant and acidic / sulfiding gases that cause chemical deterioration, as well as dust and particulates that can cause abrasion. Sources of indoor pollution that affect photographs include paint fumes, plywood, cardboard, and cleaning supplies.
- Exposure to light causes embrittlement, fading, and yellowing. The damage is cumulative and usually irreversible. UV light (including from sunlight and fluorescent light) and visible light in the blue part of the spectrum are especially harmful to photographs, but all forms of light, including incandescent and tungsten, are damaging.
- Mold growth is fostered by high temperatures and humidity as well as dust particles. They cause damage to the surface of photographs and help break down binder layers.
- The presence of insects and rodents is also fostered by high temperatures and humidity. They eat paper fiber, albumen, and gelatin binders, leaving chew marks and droppings. Species likely to cause problems include cockroaches and silverfish.

=== Other factors ===
Inappropriate storage containers and repair attempts
Cabinets made of inferior materials can give off harmful gases, while other reactive materials such as acidic paper sleeves, rubber bands, paper clips, pressure sensitive tape, and glues and adhesives commonly used for storage and repairs in the past can also cause chemical deterioration. Storing items too loosely, too tightly, or in enclosures that do not provide adequate physical protection can all cause physical damage such as curling and breakage.

Handling and use
Human handling, including by researchers and staff, can also cause both chemical and physical deterioration. Oils, dirt, lotions, and perspiration transmitted through fingerprints can destroy emulsion and cause bleaching, staining, and silver mirroring. Physical damage caused by human handling includes abrasion, scratches, tears, breakage, and cracks.

Improper chemical processing
Chemical processing, including use of exhausted fixer, insufficient length of fixing, and residual fixer left behind by inadequate washing can cause fading and discoloration. Heat, humidity, and light can accelerate such damage. Adherence to ISO standards at the time of processing can help avoid this type of deterioration.

=== Examples of threats to specific photographic materials ===
Glass plate negatives and ambrotypes are prone to breakage. Deterioration of film negatives, regardless of type, is humidity and temperature dependent. Nitrate film will first fade, then become brittle and sticky. It will then soften, adhere to paper enclosures, and produce an odor. Finally, it will disintegrate into a brown, acrid powder. Because of its flammability, it must be handled with particular care. Cellulose aetate, diacetate, and triacetate film produce acetic acid, which smells like vinegar. The deterioration process is therefore known as "vinegar syndrome". The negatives become very brittle and, in diacetate and triacetate film, the base shrinks, causing grooves ("channeling").

In addition to fading, silver-based images are prone to silver mirroring, which presents as a bluish metallic sheen on the surface of the photograph or negative and is caused by oxidation, which causes the silver to migrate to the surface of the emulsion.

Color photographs are an inherently unstable medium, and are more susceptible to light and fading than black and white photographic processes. They are composed of various dyes, all of which eventually fade, albeit at different rates (causing discoloration along with fading). Many color photographic processes are also susceptible to fading even in the dark (known as "dark-fading"). There is little that can be done to restore faded images, and even under ideal conditions, most color photographs will not survive undamaged for more than 50 years.

== Preservation strategies ==
=== Temperature and relative humidity control ===
Maintenance of a proper environment such as control of temperature and relative humidity (RH; a measure of how saturated the air is with moisture) is extremely important to the preservation of photographic materials.

Temperature should be maintained at or below 70 °F (21 °C) (the lower the better); an "often-recommended" compromise between preservation needs and human comfort is 65–70 °F (18–21 °C) (storage-only areas should be kept cooler). Temperature is the controlling factor in the stability of contemporary color photographs. For color photographs, storage at low temperatures (40 °F (4 °C) or below) is recommended.

Relative humidity should be maintained at 30–50% without cycling more than +/- 5% a day. The lower part of that range is best for "long term stability of several photographic processes". Not only do relative humidity levels above 60% cause deterioration, but also low and fluctuating humidity may also damage them.

Climate control equipment can be used to control temperatures and humidity. Air conditioners, dehumidifiers, and humidifiers can be helpful, but it is important to make sure they help instead of hurt (for example, air conditioning raises humidity).

=== Cold storage ===
Cold storage is recommended for especially vulnerable materials. Original prints, negatives, and transparencies (not glass plates, daguerreotypes, ambrotypes, tintypes, or other images on glass or metal) should be placed in packaging (archival folders in board boxes in double freezer weight Ziplock bags) in cold storage, and temperatures should be maintained at 1.7–4.4 °C (35.1–39.9 °F). According to the guideline of National Archives facilities, clear plastic bags such as Zip-locks or flush-cut bags with twist-ties (polyethylene or polypropylene plastic bags) and cotton gloves are needed.

Removing items from cold storage requires letting them acclimate to room conditions. Photographs must be allowed to warm up slowly in a cool, dry place, such as an office or processing area. Original items should be retrieved from the storage only in an emergency and no more than once a year.

Without cold storage, temperature-sensitive materials will deteriorate in a matter of a few decades; with cold storage they can remain unchanged for many centuries.

=== Light control ===
Photographs should not be hung near light. Hanging photographs on a wall can cause damage from the exposure to direct sunlight, or to fluorescent lights. Displays of photographs should be changed periodically because most photographs will deteriorate in light over time.

UV-absorbing sleeves can be used to filter out damaging rays from fluorescent tubes and UV- absorbing sheets can be placed over windows or in frames. Low UV-emitting bulbs are available. Light levels should be kept at 50–100 Lux (5–10 footcandles) for most photographs when in use for research as well as exhibit. Exposure of color slides to the light in the projector should be kept to a minimum, and photographs should be stored in dark storage. The best way to preserve a photograph is to display a facsimile.

=== Pollution control ===
Controlling air quality is difficult. Ideally, air entering a storage or exhibition area should be filtered and purified. Gaseous pollution should be removed with chemical filters or wet scrubbers. Exterior windows should be kept when possible. Interior sources of harmful gases should be minimized. Metal cabinets are preferable to wooden cabinets, which can produce harmful peroxides.

Air can be filtered to keep out gaseous pollutants and particulates such as nitrogen dioxide, sulphur dioxide, hydrogen sulfide, and ozone. Air filters must be changed regularly to be effective. Air circulation should also be checked periodically.

=== Handling control ===
Handling and use policies should be established and staff should be trained in policies and policy enforcement and telling users the policies when they arrive. Policies for processing, handling for loaned or exhibited items, and disaster prevention and recovery should also be created and followed.

Work spaces should be clean and uncluttered. Clean gloves or clean, dry hands should be used whenever photographs are handled. Foods, drink, dirt, cleaning chemicals, and photocopy machines should be kept away from photo storage, exhibit, or work spaces.

For precious materials, users should be provided with duplicates, not originals.

=== Storage systems control ===
Proper storage materials are essential for the long-term stability of photographs and negatives. Enclosures keep away dirt and pollutants. All enclosures used to house photographs and those should meet the specifications provided in the International Organization for Standardization (ISO). Most photographs can be safely kept in paper enclosures; some can also be safely stored in some types of plastic enclosures.

Paper enclosures protect objects from light, but may result in increased handling for viewing. Paper enclosures must be acid-free, lignin-free, and are available in both buffered (alkaline, pH 8.5) and unbuffered (neutral, pH 7) stock. Storage materials must pass the ANSI Photographic Activity Test (PAT) which is noted in suppliers’ catalogs. Paper enclosures also protects the photographs from the accumulation of moisture and detrimental gases and are relatively inexpensive.

Plastic enclosures include uncoated polyester film, uncoated cellulose triacetate, polyethylene, and polypropylene. Plastic enclosures are transparent. Photographs can be viewed without removal from the enclosure, thus it can reduce handling. However, plastic enclosures can trap moisture and cause ferrotyping (sticking, with a resultant glossy area). Plastic is not suitable for prints with surface damage, glass or metal-based photographs, nor for film-based negatives and transparencies from the 1950s, unless the latter are in cold storage. It should not to be used to store older safety film negatives as this may hasten their deterioration.

Horizontal storage is preferable for many photographic prints and oversize photographs. It provides overall support to the images and prevents mechanical damage such as bending. Vertical storage is often more efficient and may make access to a collection easier. Materials of similar size should be stored together. Boxes and files should not be overcrowded.

=== Reproduction and digitization ===
Unlike the born-digital photographs that are widely produced and consumed today, historical photographs such as old slides, films, and printed photos are not easy to preserve. An important component of long-term photograph preservation is making reproductions (by photocopying, photographing, or scanning and digitizing) of photographs for use in exhibitions and by researchers, which reduces the damage caused by non-controlled environments and handling.

Digitizing photographs also allows access by a much wider public, especially where the images have intrinsic historic value. Digital scans, however, are not replacements for the original, as digital file formats may become obsolete. Originals should always be preserved, even if they have been digitized. Born-digital photographs also require preservation, using digital preservation techniques.

Safeguarding European Photographic Images for Access (SEPIA) lists ten principles for digitization of historical photograph. Summarized, they are:

1. Photographs are an essential part of our cultural heritage, which contain our past, documentary and artistic value and the history of photographic processes;
2. Digitizing photographs that deteriorate quickly is urgent matter to facilitate access for a large audience;
3. Since digitization is not an end itself but a tool, selection of photographs to digitize should be based on an understanding of the nature and potential use of the collection;
4. It's essential to define the aims, priorities, technical requirements, procedures and future use for investments;
5. The creation of a digital image is a sophisticated activity which requires photographic expertise with ethical judgment;
6. Digital images need regular maintenance in order to keep pace with changing technologies;
7. A good digitization project requires teamwork, combining expertise on imaging, collection management, IT, conservation, descriptive methods and preservation strategies;
8. The input of specialists in every project is essential to integrate preservation measures in the work-flow, handle fragile materials and avoid damage to the originals;
9. Preservation specialists need to manage of digital assets in line with the overall preservation policy of the organization; and
10. Museums, archives and libraries actively involve to develop international standards for the preservation of digital collections in the long-term view.

==== Examples ====
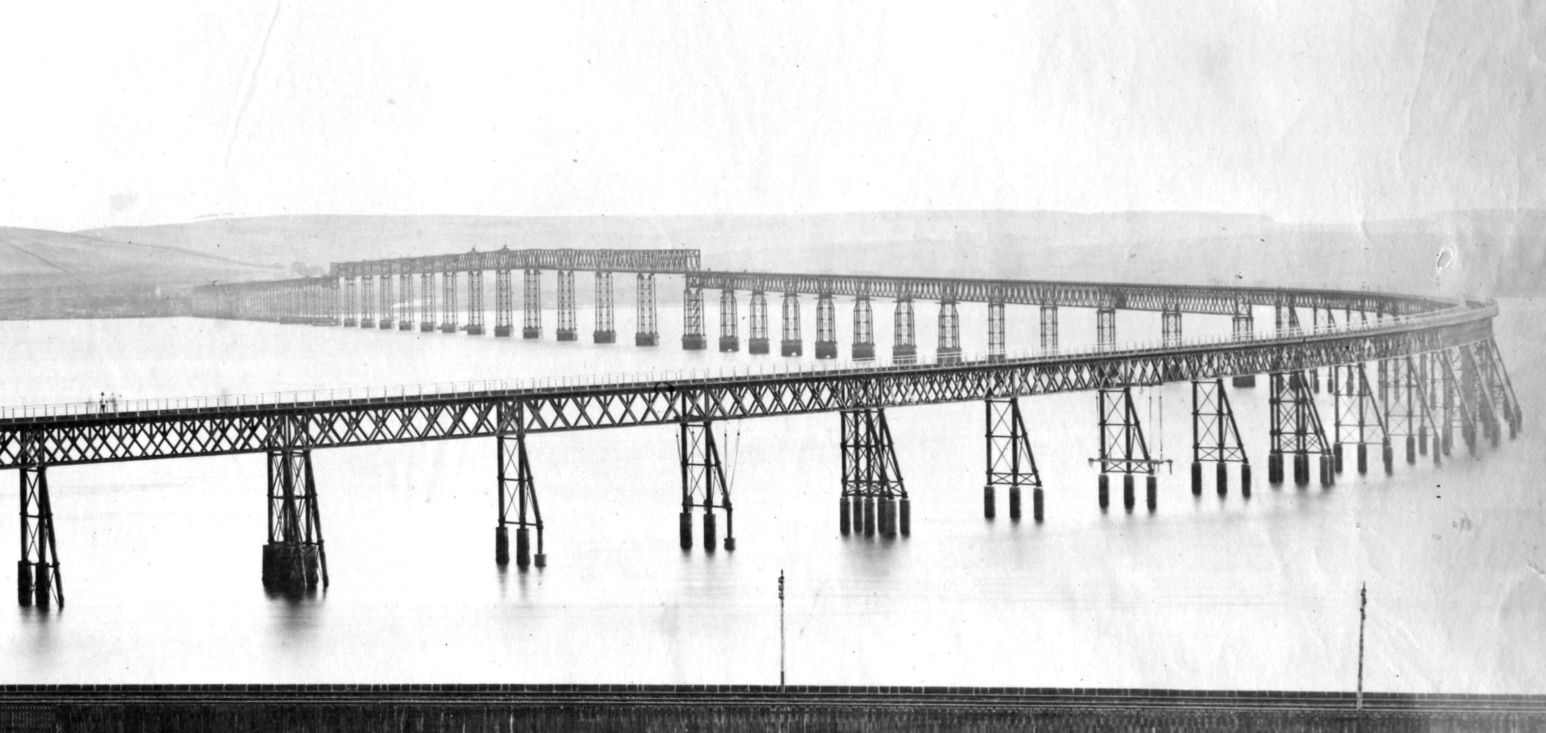
Original Tay Bridge from the north

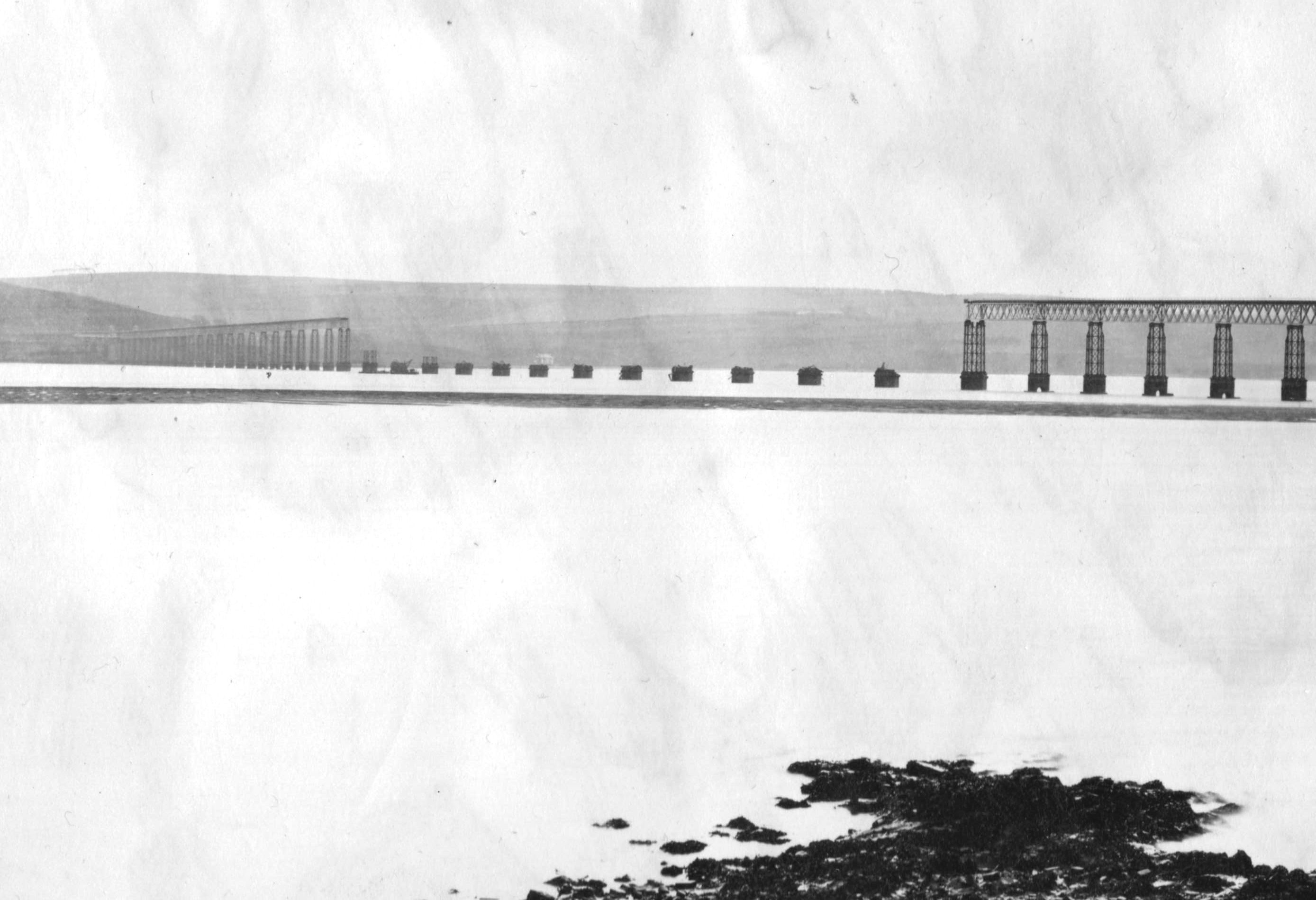
Fallen Tay Bridge from the north

An example of digitization as part of a photograph preservation strategy is the photographic collection of the Tay Bridge disaster of 1879. These photographs have been digitized and disseminated more widely. Only the positive prints survive, owing to the widespread practice of recycling the original glass negatives to reclaim the silver content. Even when carefully preserved and kept in the dark, damage can occur through intermittent exposure to light, as shown by damage to the image of the intact bridge (at left).

An example of a larger digitization project is the Cased Photographs Project, which provides access to digital images and detailed descriptions of daguerreotypes, ambrotypes, tintypes, and related photographs in the collections of the Bancroft Library and the California State Library.

== Conservation treatments ==
Photograph conservation involves the physical treatment of individual photographs. As defined by the American Institute for Conservation, treatment is "the deliberate alteration of the chemical and/or physical aspects of cultural property, aimed primarily at prolonging its existence. Treatment may consist of stabilization and/or restoration." Stabilization treatments aim to maintain photographs in their current condition, minimizing further deterioration, while restoration treatments aim to return photographs to their original state.

Conservation treatments range from very simple tear repairs or flattening to more complex treatments such as stain removal. Treatments vary widely depending on the type of photograph and its intended use. Therefore, conservators must by knowledgeable regarding both of these issues. Guides for the preservation of personal and family photograph collections, such as Cornell University's Preserving Your Family Photographs and the AIC's Caring for Your Treasures, recommend that people contact a trained conservator if they have rapidly deteriorating negatives or photographs with active mold growth, staining from pressure sensitive tape, severe tears, adhesion to enclosures, and other types of damage requiring conservation treatment.

== Professional organizations ==
There are a number of international organizations concerned with conservation of photographs along with other subjects, including the International Council on Archives (ICA), the International Institute for Conservation of Historic and Artistic Works (IIC), and the International Council of Museums - Committee for Conservation (ICOM-CC). The Photographic Records Working Group is a specialty group within the ICOM-CC.

In the United States, the national membership organization of conservation professionals is the American Institute for Conservation of Historic and Artistic works (AIC) to which the Photographic Materials Group (PMG) belongs. The Northeast Document Conservation Center (NEDCC) and the Conservation Center for Art and Historic Artifacts (CCAHA) also play an important role in the field of conservation. The Image Permanence Institute (IPI) at Rochester Institute of Technology is one of the leaders in preservation research of images in particular.

=== Codes and standards ===
Photograph conservators and preservation managers are guided in their work by codes of ethics and technical standards. The International Council on Archives publishes a Code of Ethics and Guidelines for Practice. Additionally, members of other professions (such as archivists and librarians) who deal with preservation of photographs do so in accordance with their professional organization's codes of ethics. For example, the Society of American Archivists Code of Ethics states that "Archivists protect all documentary materials for which they are responsible and guard them against defacement, physical damage, deterioration, and theft."

The International Organization for Standardization (ISO) and American National Standards Institute (ANSI) both publish technical standards that govern the materials and procedures used in photograph preservation and conservation. The International Federation of Library Associations and Institutions has published a list of ANSI standards pertaining to the care and handling of photographs.

== Education and training ==
Photograph conservators can be found in museums, archives, and libraries, as well as in private practice. Conservators often have earned their master's degrees in art conservation, though many have also been trained through apprenticeship. They often have backgrounds in art history, chemistry, or photography.

Among numerous programs concerned with conservation of photographs around the world are:

- University of Amsterdam
- University of Melbourne in Australia
- The Royal Danish Academy of Fine Arts
- Canadian Conservation Institute
- The National School of Conservation, Restoration and Museology in Mexico (ENCRyM)
- Royal Institute for the Study and Conservation of Belgium's Artistic Heritage
- Institut national du patrimoine
- Université Paris 1
- Hochschule für Technik und Wirtschaft Berlin (HTW)
- Fachhochschule Köln
- Staatlichen Akademie der Bildenden Künste Stuttgart
- Swiss Conservation-Restoration Campus
- Hochschule der Künste Bern
- Fratelli Alinari
- Studio Art Centers International, Florence (SACI)
- Royal College of Art/Victoria and Albert Museum
- The International master Program in Conservation of Antique Photographs and Paper Heritage held at the EICAP Faculty of Applied arts-Helwan University

In addition, Getty Conservation Institute (GCI) works internationally to advance conservation practice in the visual arts.

The United States, in particular, has many training or degree programs for photograph conservators offered by graduate schools and organizations such as:

- Conservation Center for Art and Historic Artifacts (CCAHA)
- Northeast Document Conservation Center (NEDCC)
- George Eastman House
- Buffalo State College
- Institute of Fine Arts, New York University
- University of Delaware
- Campbell Center for Historic Preservation Studies
- Northern States Conservation Center
- Smithsonian Center for Materials Research and Education.

There are also photographic conservation teaching courses available online from various providers, for instance:

- Conserve Photography online teaching courses
- Citaliarestauro.com online teaching course
- NEDCC online teaching course

== See also ==
- Preservation (library and archival science)
- Conservation and restoration of books, manuscripts, documents and ephemera
- Collections care
- Media preservation
- Conservation (cultural heritage)
- Conservation and restoration of photographic plates
