= Northeast Document Conservation Center =

Library and archival conservation center

- Abbreviation: NEDCC
- Formation: 1973; 53 years ago
- Founder: George Cunha
- Type: Nonprofit
- Tax ID no.: 23-7349330
- Headquarters: Andover, Massachusetts
- Executive Director: Bill Veillette
- Staff: 56 (2025)
- Website: http://www.nedcc.org
- Formerly called: New England Document Conservation Center

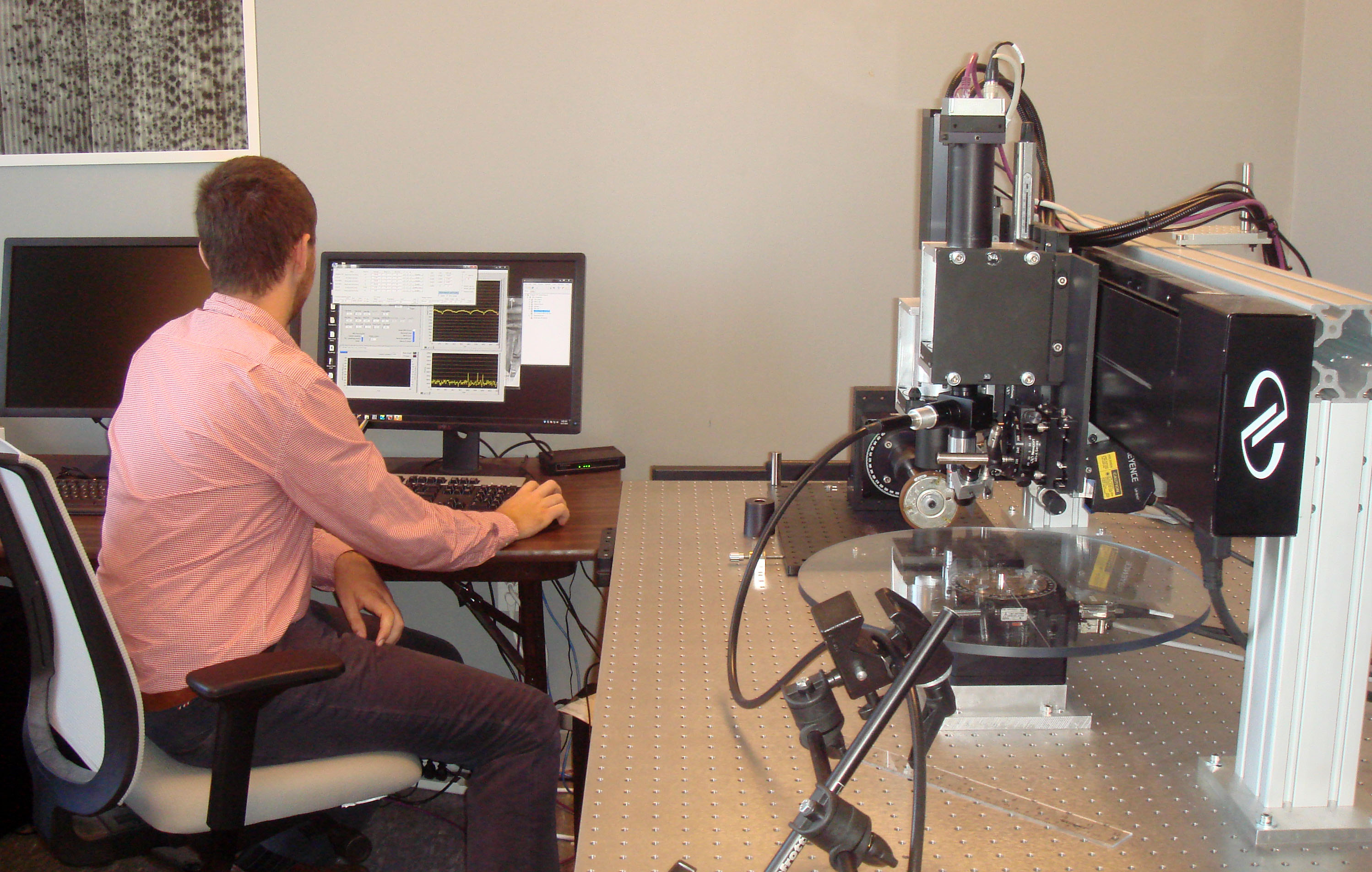
An audio preservation specialist, scans Thomas Edison National Historical Park's "Twinkle, twinkle little star" brown wax cylinder at Northeast Document Conservation Center, August 27, 2014.

The Northeast Document Conservation Center (NEDCC) is a 501(c)(3) non-profit conservation center specializing in the preservation of library and archival materials.

Founded in 1973 by George Cunha, chief conservator at the Library of the Boston Athenaeum, the New England Document Conservation Center was initiated by state librarians of the six New England states, concerned about the deterioration of documents in historical collections. The center agreed to cooperate to provide services to non-profit institutions in the region. It was established with start-up funds from the Council on Library Resources, the New England Library Board, and other donors.

From 1973 to 1980, the Center functioned as an arm of the New England Library Board. The center briefly existed on Cunha's property in Topsfield, Massachusetts, before moving to the Merrimack Valley Textile Museum in North Andover, Massachusetts in 1973 and then to Abbot Hall on the campus of Phillips Academy in Andover.

In 1980, it incorporated as a private, non-profit organization, providing services nationally and changing its name to Northeast Document Conservation Center.

== Activities ==
=== Conservation Services ===
NEDCC performs book conservation, paper conservation, photograph conservation, Asian paintings conservation, collections surveys, digitization, and audio preservation, on a fee-for-service basis. NEDCC provides services for archives, government agencies, and other cultural heritage organizations, as well as for private and family collectors.

NEDCC began offering microfilming services in 1978 to preserve and make accessible fragile historical materials. In 1983 it began a photograph duplication service.

In response to growing needs for museums to digitize X-ray film collections, in 2009 NEDCC acquired an X-ray film scanner and began offering services to scan X-ray film in the DICOM format. Two years later, in 2011, the center developed a specialized table for digitizing large oversize items.

In 2014, NEDCC began offering digitization and conservation of grooved media utilizing IRENE technology, supported by a National Leadership Grant from the Institute of Museum and Library Services (IMLS).

=== Disaster Preparedness ===
NEDCC began offering disaster planning services in 1988 with a pilot project for four New York library councils. In 2003, it developed dPlan, a disaster planning tool for libraries, archives, and cultural organizations; the tool launched in 2004.

From a partnership between NEDCC, the Massachusetts Board of Library Commissioners, the Massachusetts Archives, and other library and archives agencies, emerged COSTEP, Coordinated Statewide Emergency Preparedness beginning in 2006.

=== Preservation Training ===
NEDCC began offering preservation training in the 1980s, establishing a Preservation Services department with support from a National Endowment for the Humanities grant beginning in 1982. Since 1986 the organization has published Preservation Leaflets with technical advice on preservation and conservation of a variety of historical materials.

In 2001, NEDCC began offering "Preservation 101," a free online course. With support from the IMLS, NEDCC partnered with Simmons College (now Simmons University) Graduate School of Library and Information Science to create a Preservation Education Curriculum for graduate schools of library and information science.

NEDCC presents a yearly national conference, "Digital Directions", on creating sustainable digital collections.
