= Conservation technician =

Specialist in cultural property conservation methods

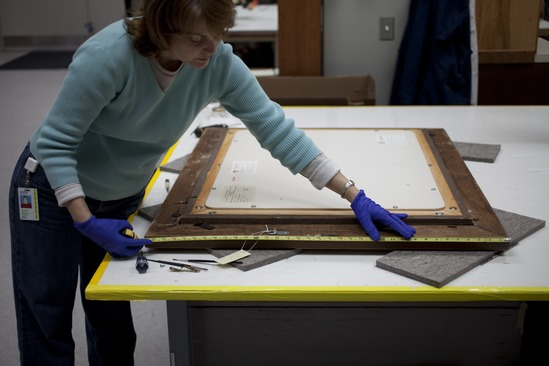
Indianapolis Museum of Art conservation technician, Laura Mosteller, documents the dimensions of a frame.

A conservation technician is a specialist in conservation methods pertaining to cultural property, and who may work in museums or public or private conservation organizations. A technician may also work in conjunction with other collection staff, such as a registrar (museum) or collection manager.

== Responsibilities ==
A conservation technician may have a broad range of responsibilities. They may be required to create housing for objects going on exhibit or update documentation on the status of an object. Other responsibilities may include conducting tests, assessing the condition of an object and helping set up exhibits. Some types of responsibilities are dependent on the museum the technician works. In a large organization a conservation technician may conduct one specific activity, such as sampling paint layers. In other museums a conservation technician may be required to conduct a wide variety of tasks, such as research, labeling objects, monitoring environmental conditions and examining works of art. For example, a technician may be asked to examine and document a newly acquired cultural object. They may document the type of materials used in the object as well as any observed degradation to the object. Additionally, the technician will document previous restoration techniques to the object.

While a conservation technician supports the activities of the conservation department, they can also assist and collaborate with the functions of other departments, such as the collection management department within a museum. In this capacity, a technician may assist collections staff to create packing crates, take photographs to document an object or document evidence of any pests.

=== Emergency preparedness ===
Mitigating and preparing for emergencies is an especially important task for conservation technicians and all conservation staff. Protecting cultural objects from fire, smoke and water damage can be particularly difficult. To ensure objects are kept as safe as possible, technician responsibilities may range from collecting appropriate equipment and supplies to creating the emergency plan. After the emergency responsibilities may include conducting conservation treatment as needed.

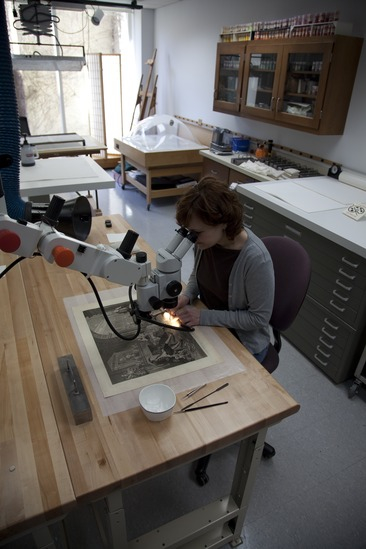
Indianapolis Museum of Art conservation technician, Laura Mosteller, examines an artwork under a binocular microscope.

== Knowledge and skills ==
The knowledge and skills a conservation technician must have is as varied as their responsibilities. According to the AIC’s Requisite Competencies for Conservation Technicians and Collection Care Specialists, some of the areas technicians should be generally knowledgeable about include collection management, conservation assessment, research, data collection, examination, the environment and treatment. The AIC list the following knowledge areas as being the most applicable for conservation technicians.

Skills technicians should have include database management, documentation techniques, emergency response techniques, laboratory techniques, such as conducting the Oddy test, and treatment techniques. Similar to the knowledge areas, the AIC also lists the most applicable skills for a conservation technician.

=== Knowledge and skill areas for Conservation Technicians ===
Knowledge	Skills
Collections Management	Communication Techniques
Conservation Assessment	Cosmetic Reintegration Techniques
Conservation, History, Ethics, Philosophies, and Goals	Database Management Techniques
Conservation Research	Documentation Techniques
Conservation Terminology	Education and Training Techniques
Data Collection	Emergency Response Techniques
Deterioration Processes	Graphic Illustration Techniques
Documentation	Handling Techniques
Emergency Preparedness	Health and Safety Techniques
Environment	Housekeeping Techniques
Examination	Housing Techniques
Exhibition	Instrumental Techniques
Health and Safety	Laboratory Techniques
Housekeeping	Mending Techniques
Laboratory and Studio Maintenance	Mount-making Techniques
Management	Organizational Techniques
Materials Properties/Conservation Chemistry	Photography Techniques
Pest Management	Stabilization Techniques
Preventive Care	Superficial Cleaning Techniques
Treatment	Technical Examination Techniques
	Treatment Techniques

== Education and training ==
In the U.S., there is no specific training or nationally recognized curriculum to become a conservation technician. Hands-on training is typically completed through internships, on the job training and mentorships. Most museums and conservation organizations require a B.A. or B.S. degree. Thus, it is beneficial to take subjects focusing on art history and civilizations as well as biology and chemistry. Individuals will also benefit from volunteering and interning at museums to acquire the appropriate skills. To be hired, some museums require at least two to five years experience.

The U.K. also does not have formalized training for conservation technicians. However, the Institute of Conservation (ICON) sponsors a Conservation Technician Qualification (CTQ), which some U.K. museums recognize. The CTQ is promoted as a way for individuals to gain training through paid or unpaid host organizations. There is no formal structure to this program; however, there are ongoing assessments looking at the progress of the individual. Furthermore, a mentor is assigned to the individual to help guide and instruct. The program is designed to help individuals gain experience and then be able to progress into conservation work or other areas.

== Professional organizations ==
There are a number of professional organizations available to conservation technicians. These organizations help promote the professional standards and interests of the conservation profession.

- American Institute of Conservation (AIC)
- Canadian Association for Conservation of Cultural Property (CAC)
- The Institute of Conservation (ICON)
- The Australian Institute for the Conservation of Cultural Material (AICCM)

== Ethics ==
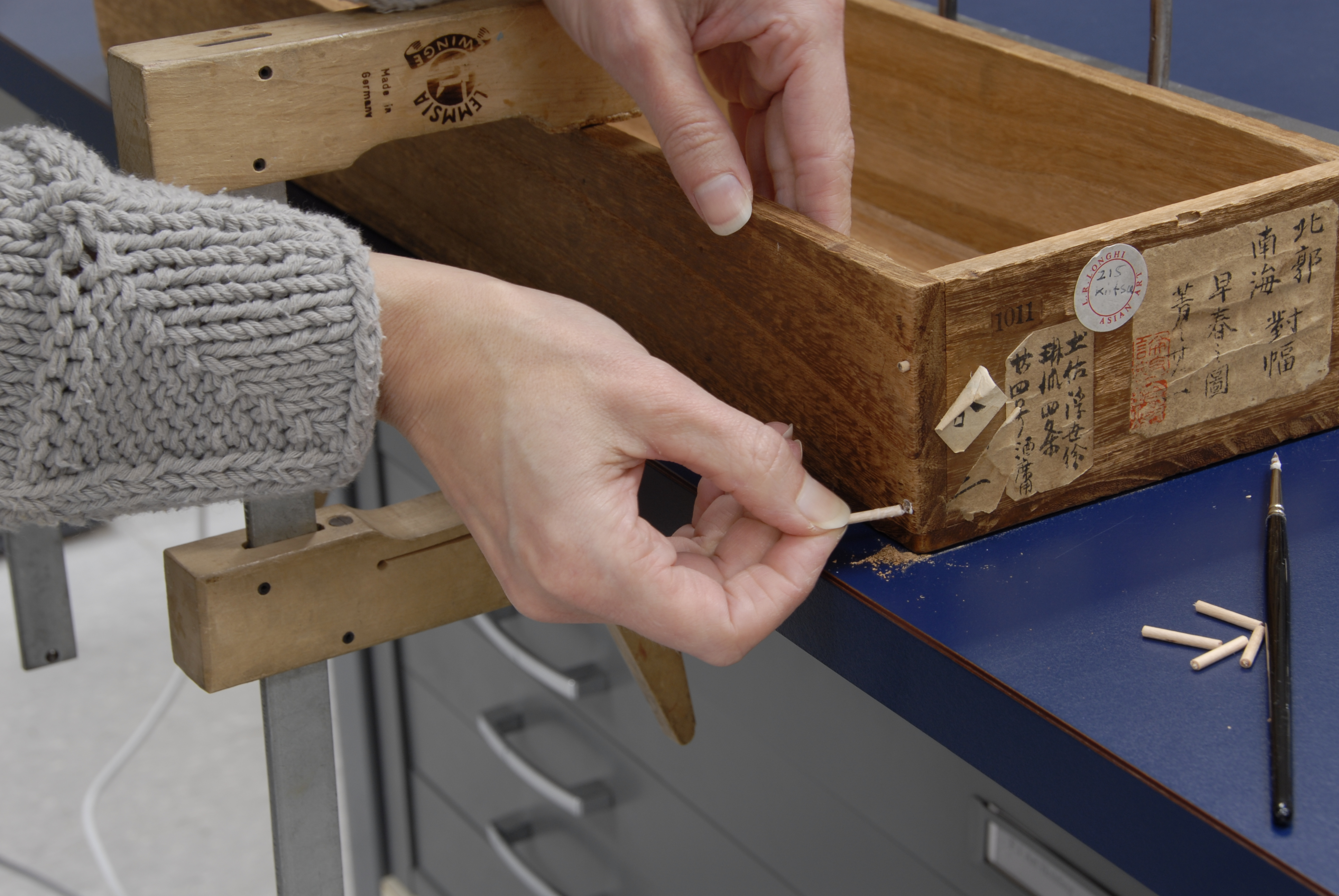
A conservation technician repairing a Japanese scroll box.

Several organizations around the globe have created guidelines for the ethical care of cultural objects. The AIC created the Code of Ethics and ICON created the Professional Guidelines. Both of these documents guide how conservators and others in the collection management field handle and respect the objects in a collection. When an object is accessioned into a collection or moved to an exhibit or sent out on loan, it requires documenting to update the conservator and collection management staff on the object’s current status. This act of documentation is a consistent theme in several of the tenets of the code. Essentially, the guidelines promote an environment of respect and honesty to ensure the objects will be preserved for the future.

The AIC has an additional document called the Guidelines for Practice that supports and complements the Code of Ethics. The guidelines pertain to professional conduct, examination and scientific investigation, preventive conservation, treatment, documentation, and emergency situations. With regard to examination and scientific investigation the guidelines expect conservators and technicians to understand the justification for the examination, the reasoning for sampling, testing and subsequent interpretation.

== Related positions ==
- Collection manager
- Conservation scientist
- Conservator
- Curator
- Mount maker
- Objects conservator
- Paintings conservator
- Registrar (museum)

== See also ==
- Conservation and restoration of cultural property
