= Objects conservator =

Individual responsible for protecting three-dimensional works

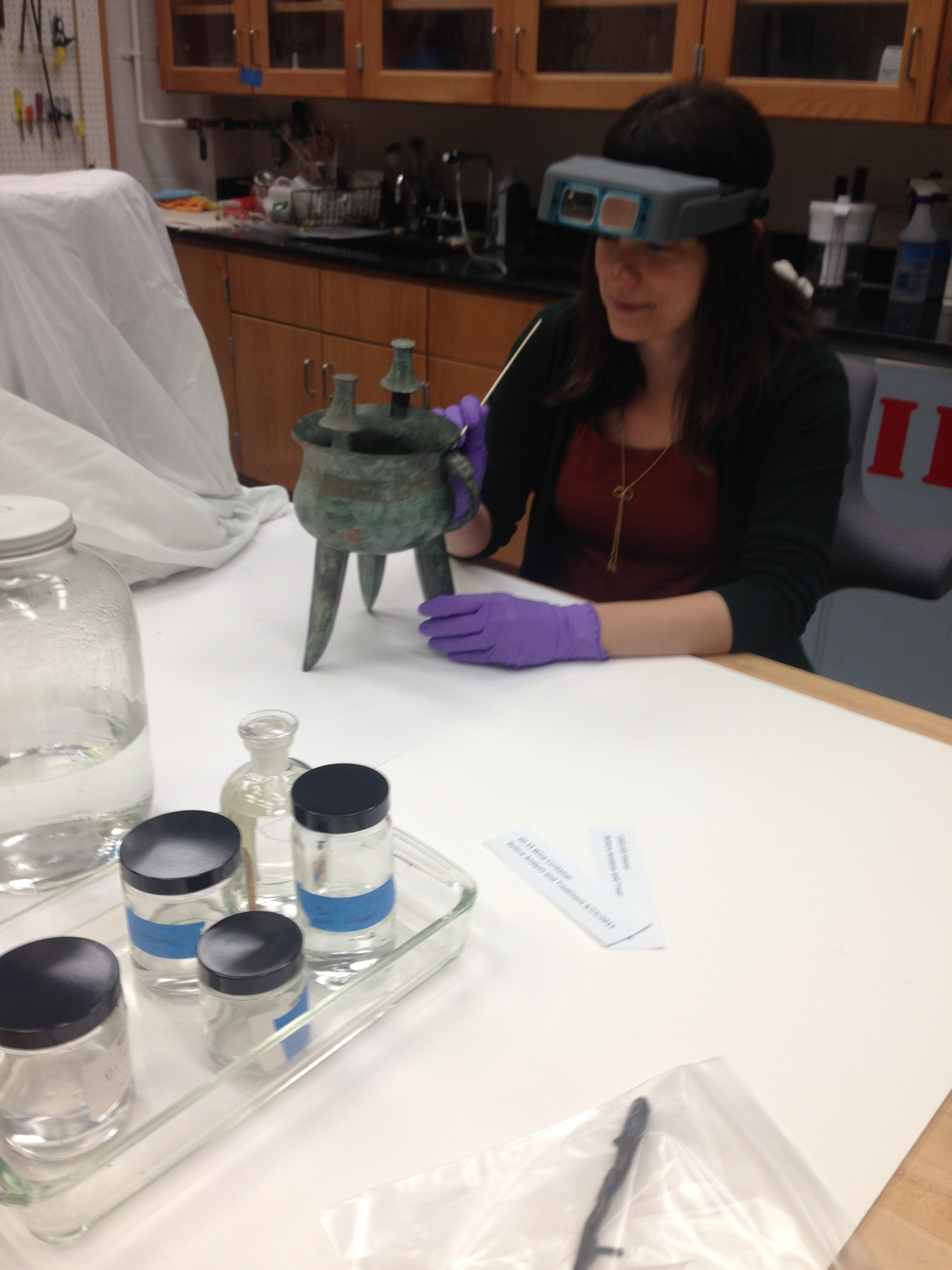
Objects conservator Laura Kubick examines an artwork at the Indianapolis Museum of Art.

An Objects conservator is a professional, working in a museum setting or private practice, that specializes in the conservation of three-dimensional works. They undergo specialized education, training, and experience that allows them to formulate and implement preventive strategies and invasive treatment protocols to preserve cultural property for the future. Objects conservators typically specialize in one type of material or class of cultural property, including metals, archaeological artifacts, ethnographic artifacts, glass, and ceramic art. Objects conservation presents many challenges due to their three-dimensional form and composite nature.

== Responsibilities and duties ==
The diverse nature of artifacts that fall into the category of three dimensional objects presents a unique challenge to compiling a set of common procedures. However, preventive measures and treatment methodologies involve similar considerations that need to be addressed, regardless of the object's composition. In the words of Cesare Brandi, "Restoration must aim to reestablish the potential unity of the work of art, as long as this is possible without producing an artistic or historical forgery and without erasing every trace of the passage of time left on the work of art." This means that an Objects Conservator needs to know when to draw the line, and communicate that limit to the object's custodian.

=== Preventive Measures ===
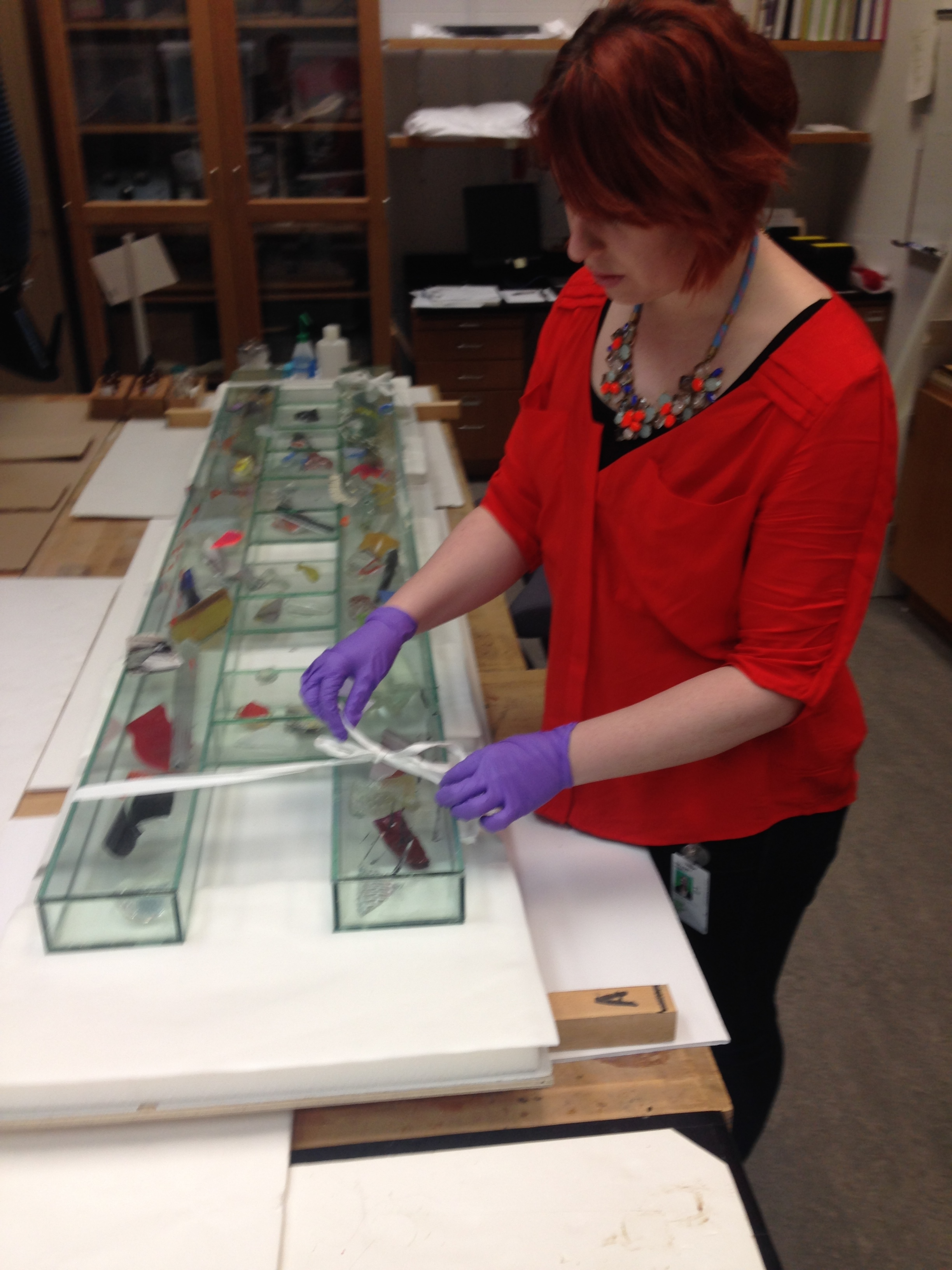
Mallory Marty prepares an object to be moved at the Indianapolis Museum of Art to prevent damage while in transit.

While not as glamorous or hands-on as the other steps in this process, collections care, or preventive conservation, is arguably the most important. To truly preserve cultural heritage for the future, it is imperative to minimize deterioration by developing and implementing procedures to minimize the amount of physical and chemical stress an object encounters. This includes its environmental conditions (relative humidity, temperature, exposure to light), integrated pest management protocols, use of specialized storage containers, strategies for packing and shipping, exhibition conditions, and an emergency preparedness plan. The initial expense of such measures often causes institutions and private collectors to balk, but in comparison to the expense of the invasive treatments that will be needed if one does not take such preventive measures, the benefit outweighs the initial investment.

Preventive conservation is also something that a private collector can implement for their own pieces. Controlling the amount of light an object is exposed to, the source of illumination, the ambient temperature of its environment, and protecting it from rapid changes in relative humidity goes a long way towards ensuring that an object will be around to pass down to future generations.

=== Treatment Protocol ===
While each object is unique, conservators begin with a similar process regardless of the artifact being assessed. A Conservator may need to stabilize an object at any stage in the process to prevent further loss, or, in extreme cases, begin by stabilizing an object before further examination can occur. Documentation takes place during every step of treatment, including: original condition, sample sites (if taken), different types of damage, areas of significant weakness before and after stabilization, and potential infestation sites. It is also important to document the objects condition before and after moving it, especially in the case of off-site transport. The ultimate goal of treatment is to preserve both the physical object and its interpretation, or cultural context.

==== Examination ====
The first step of any treatment protocol is a thorough examination of the object. This includes both its physical components and its cultural importance. Physical components include the materials used, its construction, and the appearance of the object's surface. The conservator often employs different techniques for this portion of the examination, including photographs taken in different light conditions such as visible, raking, and Ultraviolet to examine the surface, and x-rays to reveal the structure within. Cultural significance is more challenging to determine, including the object's meaning, function, intended use, and importance to society.

Thorough examination and research allows the Conservator to reconstruct an object's history and, together with the object's custodian (the owner, a curator, registrar, or collection manager) determine the object's ideal state and determine a realistic treatment goal.

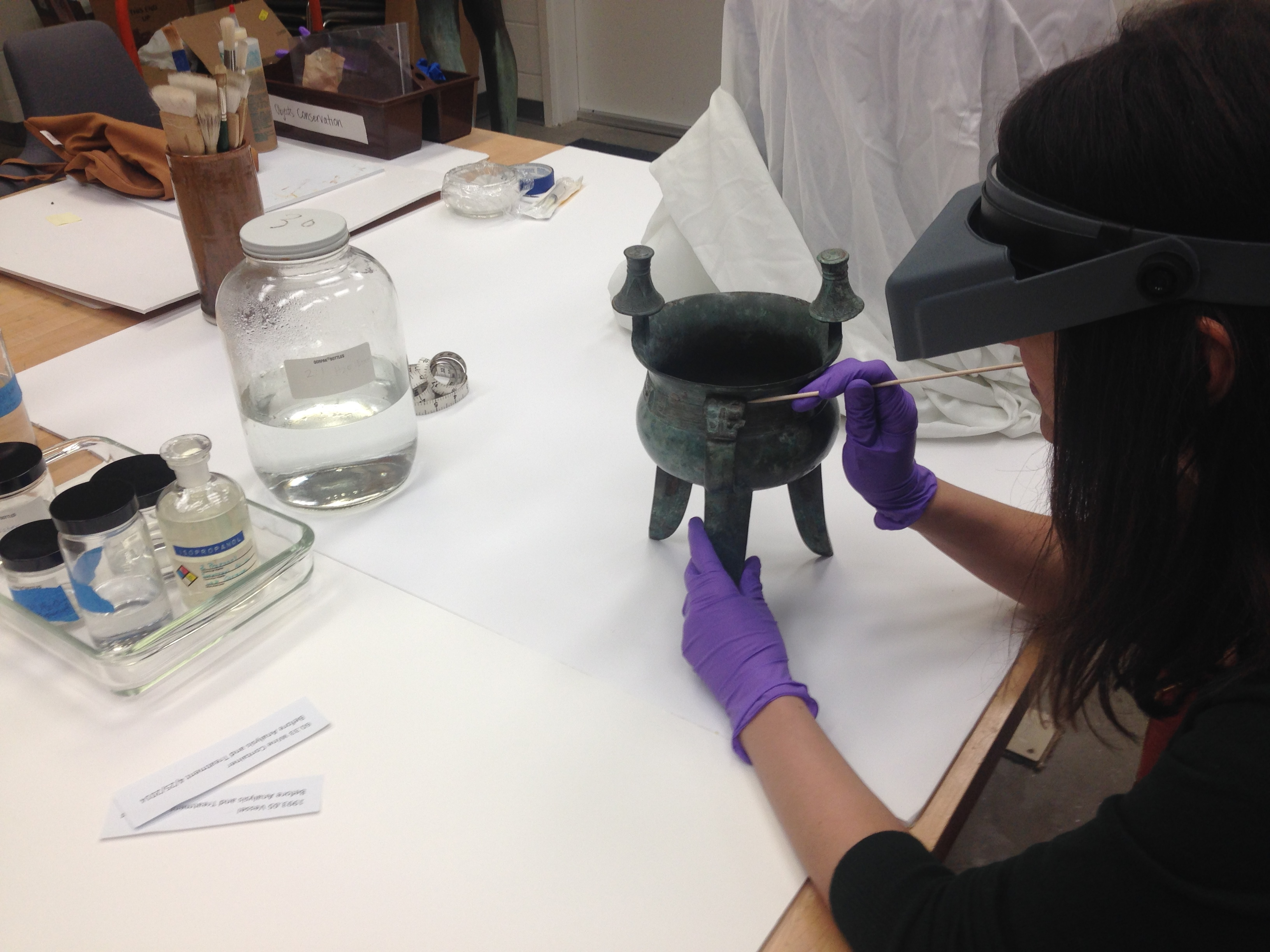
Laura Kubick treats an object at the Indianapolis Museum of Art

==== Treatment ====
Following examination the Conservator will prepare a pre-treatment report that discusses the treatment goal for the object and the planned course of action. As defined by AIC, treatment is "The deliberate alteration of the chemical and/or physical aspects of cultural property, aimed primarily at prolonging its existence." This can be something as minimal as reinforcing flaking paint, or something as complex as the migration of metals and salts through a wooden statue, leading to loss of strength, shrinkage, separation between the wooden support, metal fastenings, and decorative outer surface.

== Knowledge, abilities, and skills ==
Objects Conservators must be an expert collaborator, working with members of the public and museum professionals alike. Conservation is not a vacuum and practitioners collaborate with colleagues around the world, lending expertise and receiving guidance. They need to advocate for the object, explain their treatment protocol, the importance of preventive measures, and stand firm when asked to reconsider a "no". They must also be open to alternative interpretations, have an understanding of different materials and construction techniques, keen observation skills, and deft hands.

== Education & training ==
Most museums and prestigious private firms require graduate degrees in Conservation. Without graduate level education, knowledge of chemistry, hands-on experience, and a thorough foundation in documentation, evaluation, and treatment an institution or firm is taking a serious risk. Anyone can call themselves a conservator, but it is the specialized training gained through graduate programs or similar experiences that count.

Gaining admission to a conservation graduate program includes an undergraduate degree, a concentration in chemistry (specifically organic chemistry), and a significant number of hours working under a trained Conservator. This ensures that the candidate has a through foundation upon which to build and is already familiar with many aspects of the process.

These programs include University of Delaware, NYU, Buffalo State University, Queens University, University College London, Cardiff University

== Areas of Specialty ==
Due to the diverse nature of this type of cultural heritage, most objects conservators specialize on one type of artifact or material. The following are a selection of possible specialties:

- Archaeological Materials
- Ceramics
- Ethnographic Artifacts
  - Plant-based materials
  - Animal-based materials
- Glass
- Metals
- Natural History Collections
  - Fossils
  - Preserved specimen
- Wooden Objects

== Organizations/Professional Societies ==
- American Institute for Conservation of Historic and Artistic Works (AIC)
- International Council of Museums - Committee for Conservation(ICOM-CC)
- International Institute for Conservation of Historic and Artistic Works (ICC)
- Canadian Association for Conservation (CAC)

== Related positions ==
- Paintings Conservator
- Conservation Scientist
- Conservation Technician
