= Conservation Center for Art and Historic Artifacts =

- Interactive map of the Conservation Center for Art and Historic Artifacts area

General information
- Type: Conservation center
- Location: Philadelphia, Pennsylvania, United States
- Coordinates: 39.949447802413275°N 75.17859093301767°W
- Opened: 1997

Website
- https://ccaha.org/

The Conservation Center for Art & Historic Artifacts (CCAHA), located in Philadelphia, Pennsylvania, was founded by Marilyn Kemp Weidner in 1977, with funding from the National Endowment for the Humanities and in response to the growing problem of paper deterioration occurring in archives in the Mid-Atlantic region.

Currently one of the largest nonprofit paper conservation facilities in the country, CCAHA specializes in the treatment of art and historic artifacts on paper, including drawings, prints, maps, posters, historic wallpaper, photographs, books, scrapbooks, and manuscripts, as well as related materials like parchment and papyrus. CCAHA serves cultural, research, and educational institutions, such as museums, libraries, archives, and historical societies, both in its region and across the country. It also works with individuals and private organizations.

Treatments include Bruce Springsteen's original lyric notebooks and scrapbooks, Frank Lloyd Wright's architectural drawings, John James Audubon Birds of America prints, Civil War muster rolls, and works by Degas, Matisse, and Picasso. CCAHA was instrumental in the 2014 discovery of two previously-unknown Cézanne sketches belonging to the Barnes Foundation.

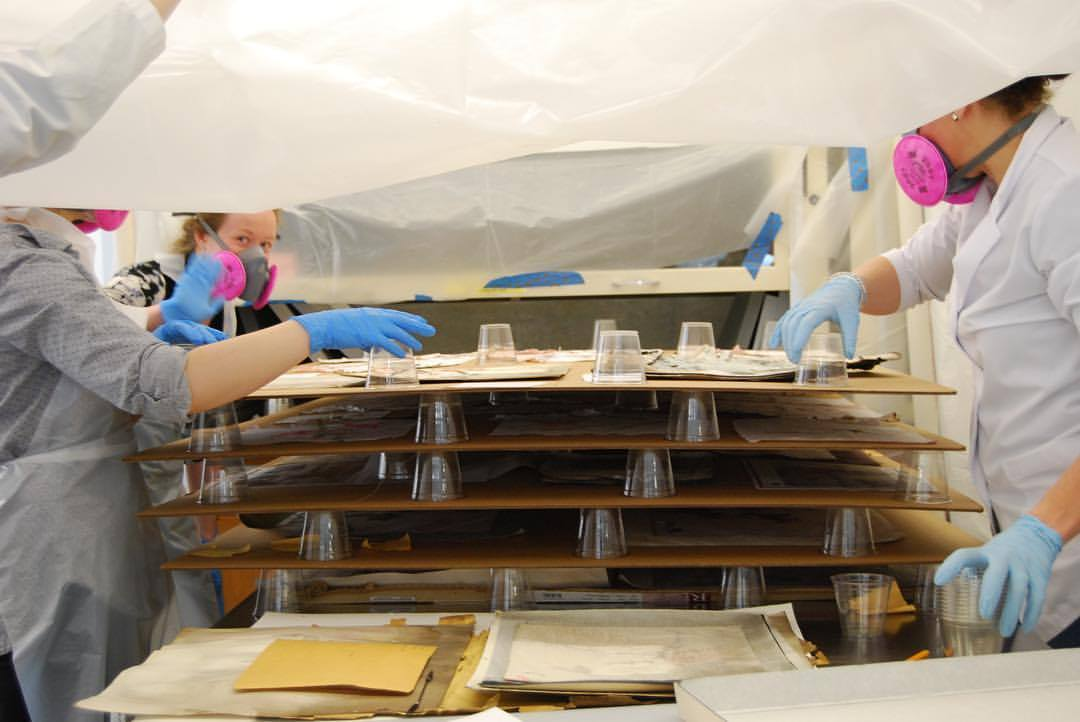
CCAHA’s conservation staff laying out fire, water, and mold damaged items to dry.

In addition to treatment services, CCAHA offers nationwide educational programs on disaster planning, collections care, and records and archives management. These lectures, seminars, and workshops are designed for professional staff who have primary responsibility for the care and handling of artifacts, such as curators, collections managers, archivists, and librarians.

Other services include digital imaging, conservation matting and framing, on-site consultations, emergency conservation services and disaster assistance, and help with grantwriting and exhibition planning.

== See also ==
Preservation (library and archive)
