= Shrinkage Fields (image restoration) =

Shrinkage fields is a random field-based machine learning technique that aims to perform high quality image restoration (denoising and deblurring) using low computational overhead.

== Method ==
The restored image $x$ is predicted from a corrupted observation $y$ after training on a set of sample images $S$.

A shrinkage (mapping) function ${f}_{{\pi }_{i}}\left(v\right)={\sum }_{j=1}^{M}{\pi }_{i,j}\exp \left(-\frac{\gamma }{2}{\left(v-{\mu }_{j}\right)}^{2}\right)$ is directly modeled as a linear combination of radial basis function kernels, where $\gamma$ is the shared precision parameter, $\mu$ denotes the (equidistant) kernel positions, and M is the number of Gaussian kernels.

Because the shrinkage function is directly modeled, the optimization procedure is reduced to a single quadratic minimization per iteration, denoted as the prediction of a shrinkage field ${g}_{\mathrm{\Theta }}\left(\text{x}\right)={\mathcal{F}}^{-1}\left\lbrack \frac{\mathcal{F}\left(\lambda {K}^{T}y+{\sum }_{i=1}^{N}{F}_{i}^{T}{f}_{{\pi }_{i}}\left({F}_{i}x\right)\right)}{\lambda {\check{K}}^{\text{*}}\circ \check{K}+{\sum }_{i=1}^{N}{\check{F}}_{i}^{\text{*}}\circ {\check{F}}_{i}}\right\rbrack ={\mathrm{\Omega }}^{-1}\eta$ where $\mathcal{F}$ denotes the discrete Fourier transform and $F_x$ is the 2D convolution $\text{f}\otimes \text{x}$ with point spread function filter, $\breve{F}$ is an optical transfer function defined as the discrete Fourier transform of $\text{f}$, and ${\breve{F}}^{\text{*}}$ is the complex conjugate of $\breve{F}$.

${\hat{x}}_{t}$ is learned as ${\hat{x}}_{t}={g}_{{\mathrm{\Theta }}_{t}}\left({\hat{x}}_{t-1}\right)$ for each iteration $t$ with the initial case ${\hat{x}}_{0}=y$, this forms a cascade of Gaussian conditional random fields (or cascade of shrinkage fields (CSF)). Loss-minimization is used to learn the model parameters ${\mathrm{\Theta }}_{t}={\left\lbrace {\lambda }_{t},{\pi }_{\mathit{ti}},{f}_{\mathit{ti}}\right\rbrace }_{i=1}^{N}$.

The learning objective function is defined as $J\left({\mathrm{\Theta }}_{t}\right)={\sum }_{s=1}^{S}l\left({\hat{x}}_{t}^{\left(s\right)};{x}_{gt}^{\left(s\right)}\right)$, where $l$ is a differentiable loss function which is greedily minimized using training data ${\left\lbrace {x}_{gt}^{\left(s\right)},{y}^{\left(s\right)},{k}^{\left(s\right)}\right\rbrace }_{s=1}^{S}$ and ${\hat{x}}_{t}^{\left(s\right)}$.

== Performance ==
Preliminary tests by the author suggest that RTF_{5} obtains slightly better denoising performance than ${\text{CSF}}_{7\times 7}^{\left\lbrace \mathrm{3,4,5}\right\rbrace }$, followed by ${\text{CSF}}_{5\times 5}^{5}$, ${\text{CSF}}_{7\times 7}^{2}$, ${\text{CSF}}_{5\times 5}^{\left\lbrace \mathrm{3,4}\right\rbrace }$, and BM3D.

BM3D denoising speed falls between that of ${\text{CSF}}_{5\times 5}^{4}$ and ${\text{CSF}}_{7\times 7}^{4}$, RTF being an order of magnitude slower.

== Advantages ==
- Results are comparable to those obtained by BM3D (reference in state of the art denoising since its inception in 2007)
- Minimal runtime compared to other high-performance methods (potentially applicable within embedded devices)
- Parallelizable (e.g.: possible GPU implementation)
- Predictability: $O(D \log D)$ runtime where $D$ is the number of pixels
- Fast training even with CPU

== Implementations ==
- A reference implementation has been written in MATLAB and released under the BSD 2-Clause license: shrinkage-fields

== See also ==
- Random field
- Discrete Fourier transform
- Convolution
- Noise reduction
- Deblurring
