= Digital restoration =

Digital restoration is a process of digitisation of non-digital content and may apply to:

- Digital photograph restoration
- Digital film preservation
