= Echo removal =

Echo removal is the process of removing echo and reverberation artifacts from audio signals. The reverberation is typically modeled as the convolution of a (sometimes time-varying) impulse response with a hypothetical clean input signal, where both the clean input signal (which is to be recovered) and the impulse response are unknown. This is an example of an inverse problem. In almost all cases, there is insufficient information in the input signal to uniquely determine a plausible original image, making it an ill-posed problem. This is generally solved by the use of a regularization term to attempt to eliminate implausible solutions.

This problem is analogous to deblurring in the image processing domain.

Adaptive filtering remains the core of almost all commercial echo cancellation systems, but modern research adds deep learning techniques.

== Digital network echo cancellers ==
Used to remove unwanted echoes in telephone and VoIP networks, ensuring clear speech and maintaining acceptable quality of service. Commonly implemented with adaptive filters that estimate and subtract the echo path and suppress unwanted residuals.

== See also ==
- Echo suppression and cancellation
- Digital room correction
- Noise reduction
- Linear prediction coder
