= Inpaint =

- Developer(s): Maxim Gapchenko
- Stable release: 11.0.2 / September 9, 2024; 9 months ago
- Operating system: macOS, Windows, iOS
- Type: Raster graphics editor
- Website: www.theinpaint.com

Inpaint is a graphics software for retouching photos and removing unwanted objects, supported on Microsoft Windows and Macintosh.

== Features ==
Inpaint focuses on photo editing via simplified semi-automatic tools and mechanisms. The program includes a tool similar to the Healing Brush tool in Adobe Photoshop CS5 with the Content-Aware mode on. Similar to Healing Brush, the tool tries to replace bad or damaged texture with good texture from another area to create a seamless repair of an image.

Specifically, Inpaint is capable of performing the following functions:

- Removal of unwanted objects from an image
- Facial retouching
- Old photos repair
- Arbitrary merging of multiple images into one
- Object cloning
- Restoring empty areas on panorama photos

Batch processing of multiple images is possible via the Batch Inpaint version.

It also contains online tutorials.
