= Image restoration by artificial intelligence =

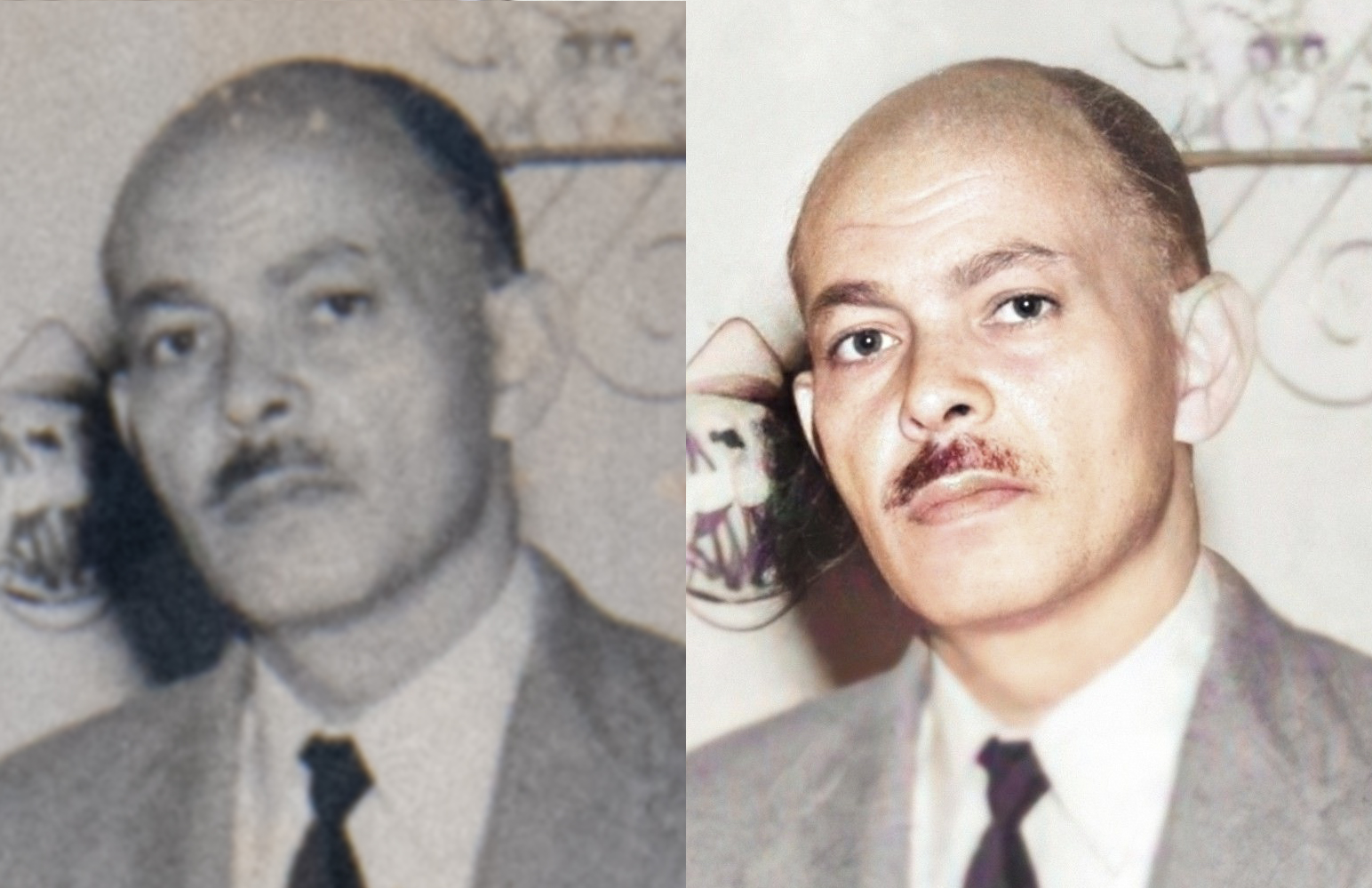
Digital photograph restoration and colorization using artificial intelligence

Image restoration is the operation of taking a corrupt/noisy image and estimating the clean, original image. Corruption may come in many forms such as motion blur, noise and camera mis-focus. Image restoration is performed by reversing the process that blurred the image and such is performed by imaging a point source and use the point source image, which is called the Point Spread Function (PSF) to restore the image information lost to the blurring process.

Image restoration is different from image enhancement in that the latter is designed to emphasize features of the image that make the image more pleasing to the observer, but not necessarily to produce realistic data from a scientific point of view. Image enhancement techniques (like contrast stretching or de-blurring by a nearest neighbor procedure) provided by imaging packages use no a priori model of the process that created the image.

With image enhancement noise can effectively be removed by sacrificing some resolution, but this is not acceptable in many applications. In a fluorescence microscope, resolution in the z-direction is bad as it is. More advanced image processing techniques must be applied to recover the object.

== Main use cases ==
The objective of image restoration techniques is to reduce noise and recover resolution loss. Image processing techniques are performed either in the image domain or the frequency domain. The most straightforward and a conventional technique for image restoration is deconvolution, which is performed in the frequency domain and after computing the Fourier transform of both the image and the PSF and undo the resolution loss caused by the blurring factors. Nowadays, photo restoration is done using digital tools and software to fix any type of damage images may have and improve the general quality and definition of the details.

=== Types of AI corrections ===
1. Geometric correction

2. Radiometric correction

3. Denoising

Image restoration techniques aim to reverse the effects of degradation and restore the image as closely as possible to its original or desired state. The process involves analysing the image and applying algorithms and filters to remove or reduce the degradations. The ultimate goal is to enhance the visual quality, improve the interpretability, and extract relevant information from the image.

Image restoration can be broadly categorized into two main types: spatial domain and frequency domain methods. Spatial domain techniques operate directly on the image pixels, while frequency domain methods transform the image into the frequency domain using techniques such as the Fourier transform, where restoration operations are performed. Both approaches have their advantages and are suitable for different types of image degradation.

== Techniques and algorithms ==
=== Spatial domain methods ===
Spatial domain techniques primarily operate on the pixel values of an image. Some common methods in this domain include:

==== Median filtering ====
This technique replaces each pixel value with the median value in its local neighborhood, effectively reducing impulse noise.

==== Wiener filtering ====
Based on statistical models, the Wiener filter minimizes the mean square error between the original image and the filtered image. It is particularly useful for reducing noise and enhancing blurred images.

==== Total variation regularization ====
This technique minimizes the total variation of an image while preserving important image details. It is effective in removing noise while maintaining image edges.

== Frequency domain methods ==
Frequency domain techniques involve transforming the image from the spatial domain to the frequency domain, typically using the Fourier transform. Some common methods in this domain include:

=== Inverse filtering ===
This technique aims to recover the original image by estimating the inverse of the degradation function. However, it is highly sensitive to noise and can amplify noise in the restoration process.

=== Constrained least squares filtering ===
By incorporating constraints on the solution, this method reduces noise and restores the image while preserving important image details.

=== Homomorphic filtering ===
It is used for enhancing images that suffer from both additive and multiplicative noise. This technique separately processes the low-frequency and high-frequency components of the image to improve visibility.

== Applications ==
Image restoration has a wide range of applications in various fields, including:

=== Forensic analysis ===
In criminal investigations, image restoration techniques can help enhance surveillance footage, recover details from low-quality images, and improve the identification of objects or individuals.

=== Medical imaging ===
Image restoration is crucial in medical imaging to improve the accuracy of diagnosis. It helps in reducing noise, enhancing contrast, and improving image resolution for techniques such as X-ray, MRI, CT scans, and ultrasound.

=== Photography ===
Image restoration techniques are commonly used in digital photography to correct imperfections caused by factors like motion blur, lens aberrations, and sensor noise. They can also be used to restore old and damaged photographs.

=== Archival preservation ===
Image restoration plays a significant role in preserving historical documents, artworks, and photographs. By reducing noise, enhancing faded details, and removing artifacts, valuable visual content can be preserved for future generations.

== Challenges and future directions ==
Despite significant advancements in image restoration, several challenges remain. Some of the key challenges include handling complex degradations, dealing with limited information, and addressing the trade-off between restoration quality and computation time.

The future of image restoration is likely to be driven by developments in deep learning and artificial intelligence. Convolutional neural networks (CNNs) have shown promising results in various image restoration tasks, including denoising, super-resolution, and inpainting. The use of generative adversarial networks (GANs) has also gained attention for realistic image restoration.

Additionally, emerging technologies such as computational photography and multi-sensor imaging are expected to provide new avenues for image restoration research and applications.

== See also ==
- Computer vision
- Super-resolution microscopy
