= Conservation and restoration of photographic plates =

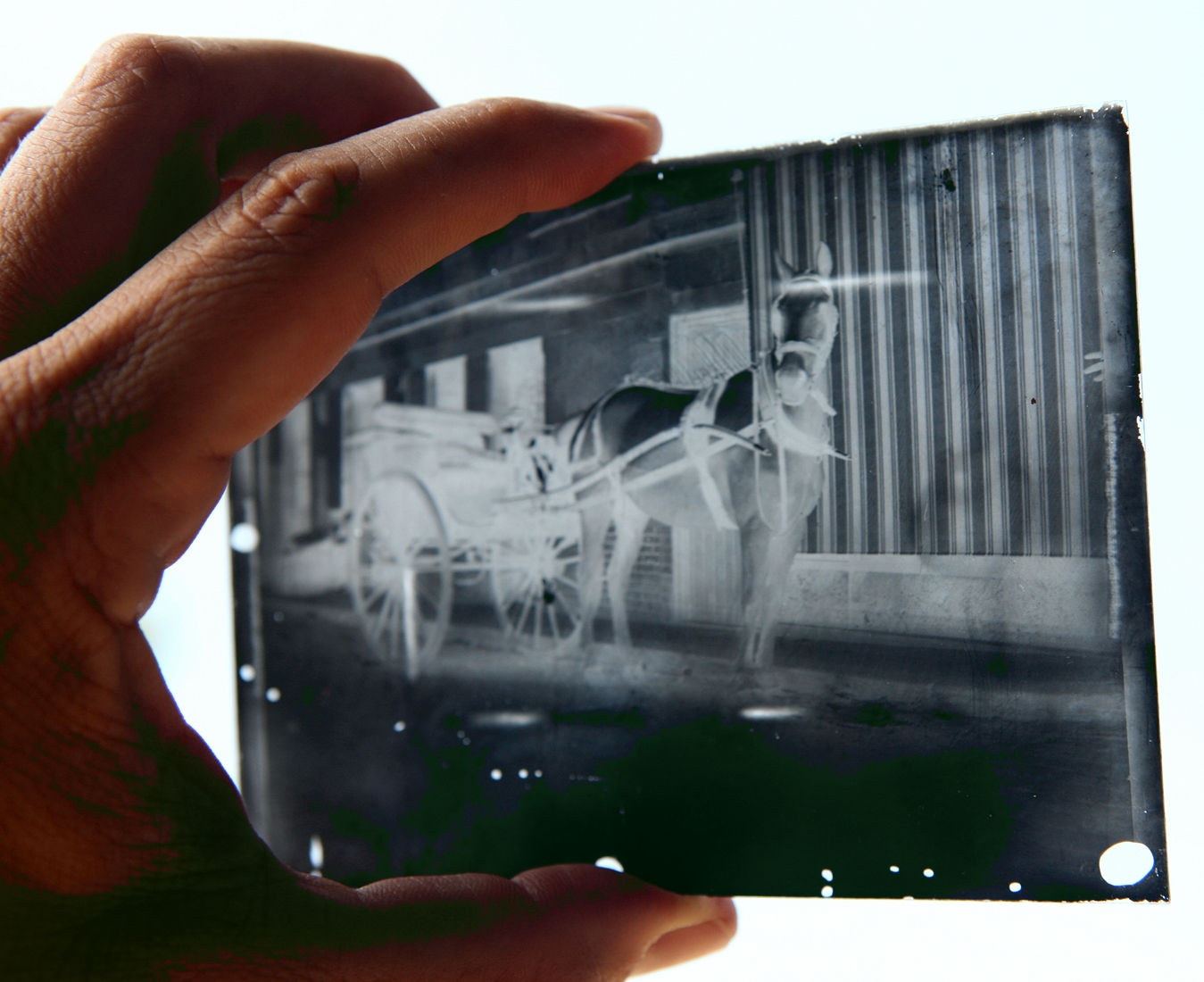
Glass plate negative

The conservation and restoration of photographic plates is the practice of caring for and maintaining photographic plates to preserve their materials and content. The practice includes the measures that can be taken by conservators, curators, collection managers, and other professionals to conserve the material unique to photographic plate processes. This practice includes understanding the composition and agents of deterioration of photographic plates, as well as the preventive, and interventive conservational measures that can be taken to increase a photographic image's longevity.

== History ==
=== Composition ===
In general, black and white photographic negatives are made up of fine silver particles (or color dyes for color negatives), which are embedded in a thin layer called a binder; the two together comprising the emulsion. This emulsion layer sits upon what is called the support, which can be paper, metal, film, or, as in the case of photographic plates, glass. Before exposure, a photographic plate consists of a photosensitive substance layered on a support medium. Glass plates emerged as a common support medium for photographic negatives from the mid-nineteenth century to the 1920s. Depending upon the period, there can be variants to the binder and, thus, the chemistry of the image. In the case of the Wet Plate Collodion, the image is run under a wash bath to stop the development of the image after exposure. An important part of the photographic process, "fixing", is then used to wash the silver particles that are not part of the image, which then produces a stable negative image. The fix bath will ensure that the remaining silver halide crystals are no longer sensitive to additional light exposure, removing all excess. This negative image can then be used over many years to produce paper positives. It is important for the conservator to understand the chemistry, in order to prevent further chemical reactions.

=== Processes ===
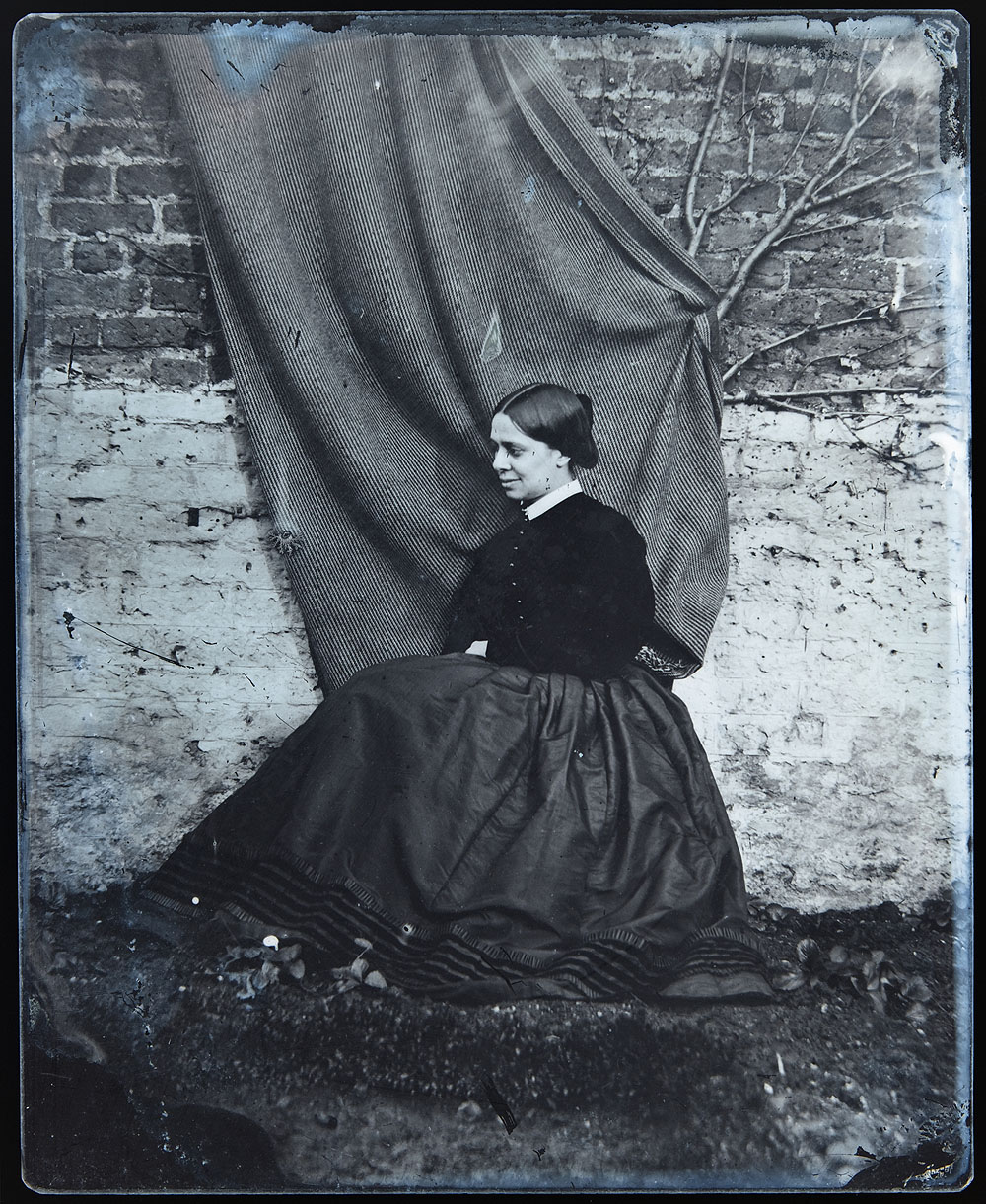
Early wet-plate collodion portrait of a lady

- Collodion glass plate negative: This process was invented by the Englishman Frederick Scott Archer in 1851. While the first process to take advantage of glass plates was the albumen print method, it was quite laborious and was quickly surpassed by the collodion glass plate negative in common use. The collodion photographic process was a wet plate process, which meant that the glass plate itself had to be wet while it was exposed and throughout processing. This required a portable darkroom to be taken wherever a photographer went, in order to produce a negative image successfully. During the process, the collodion emulsion was poured onto a glass plate before being exposed. The glass plate was then developed, fixed, washed, and protected with a varnish. Collodion is cotton dissolved in nitric acid. Because collodion was both complex and dangerous to produce, it was often purchased by the photographer. Once dissolved, iodide was added. Over time, bromide was added to help the image be more sensitive to light. Sometimes albumen (made of egg whites) was used to help the collodion stick to the glass plate. Pyrogallic Acid or ferrous sulfate was often used to develop the latent image, then sodium thiosulfate (also known as hypo) or potassium cyanide was used to fix the image.
- Gelatin dry plate negative: This process was invented by Richard Leach Maddox in 1871, but it was not commonly used until 1879, when the process became commercially successful. Because of this process's advances in photography, it soon replaced the wet plate process in the 1880s. The collodion binder formerly used was replaced by gelatin, which already contained light-sensitive silver salts. This meant the emulsion was already present and did not have to be painted on the glass plate right before exposure – which now took less than one second. Because of this advancement, photographers did not have to carry a portable darkroom, as the plate could be developed later. To make the gelatin dry plate, the glass was cleaned, polished, and treated to ensure the gelatin would adhere to the glass plate. Treatments included applying thin layers of gelatin, albumen, or chemical etching. After 1879, when further improvements were made to the gelatin emulsion, gelatin glass plates began being mass-produced by companies such as Wratten & Wainright, Keystone Dry Plate Works, and notably the Eastman Dry Plate Company. This led to the advanced use and production of photographic glass plates until around 1925 and marked the start of the development of modern photography as an industry.
- Screen Plate: The Screen Plate process is also known as Autochrome Lumière and was invented in France in 1907 by Louis and Auguste Lumière. Screen plates were an additive color screen process considered the first successful color process for commercial photography. The Lumière brothers drew upon the color theories of James Clerk Maxwell and Louis Ducos de Hauron from the second half of the 19th century. Autochrome plates were "covered in microscopic red, green, and blue colored potato starch grains". These grains, before being placed on the glass plate, were sorted through sieves to break them down to "thousandths of a millimeter" in diameter. Once broken down in size, they were separated into groups, then dyed either red, violet, or green. The grains were mixed and then spread over a glass plate covered with a tacky varnish. A second varnish was then applied over the layer of starch grains. The second coating of varnish was a hydrophobic layer composed of castor oil, cellulose nitrate, and dammar resin.
- Ambrotype: The Ambrotype process resembled the Wet Plate Collodion considerably in composition and creation, and was considered to be a "Collodion Positive". In 1850, Louis Désiré Blanquart-Evrard realized that the negative appeared as a positive by underexposing the image and placing the image against a dark background. Dark backgrounds—created with paints, fabrics, and papers—were used to achieve this effect. In some instances, bleach was used, after the image was developed, to yield a softer appearance. In this process, the chemical composition and fix bath are critical elements to the lifespan of the image, but the material that backs the glass plate may also cause deterioration.

== Agents of deterioration ==
Water-damaged ambrotype with case disassembled

There are ten accepted agents of deterioration: dissociation, fire, incorrect relative humidity, incorrect temperature, light, pests, pollutants, physical forces, thieves, and water. Photographic plates face risks of damage from both external forces and from their own chemical composition. For a conservator to create an appropriate plan to protect against agents of deterioration, they must understand what might impact a photographic plate. The following list addresses how each agent of deterioration harms photographic glass plates.

=== Relative humidity and temperature ===
Relative humidity (RH) and temperature are two of the most common threats to photographic plates. As with all material collections, high temperature in combination with high humidity can cause mold growth and attract pests.

Photographic plates face significant structural and chemical challenges unique to their makeup. There are two types of photographic glass plates: collodion wet plates and gelatin dry plates. Structurally, collodion wet plates are held together with a specific emulsion type, made using a silver halide mixture in gelatin. Fluctuations in RH can strain the adhesive emulsion, causing the gelatin to expand and contract. The strain from incorrect RH can also cause the emulsion to crack or separate along the plates' edges. With gelatin dry plates, high humidity can cause mold to grow on the emulsion. High levels of humidity can cause glass plates that have been stored incorrectly to stick together, compromising the image on the plate. Increasing RH can cause deterioration of other elements; these include the silver halide, varnish, and glass support. Decreasing the RH will cause deterioration by eventually leading to the flaking of the binder and dehydration of the glass.

Much like RH, temperatures must be precise and closely monitored for the correct storage of photographic glass plates. A safe temperature to keep glass plates is 65 °F (18 °C); however, a fluctuation of ± 2 °F (−17 °C) would not cause a significant impact, making the safest range 63 to 67 °F (17 to 19 °C). Low temperatures aid in slowing a plate's inherent fragility by delaying the chemical reactions that cause decay of the plate's structure. Increasing temperatures or frequently high fluctuations will speed up the decay process.

=== Theft and dissociation ===
Although theft and dissociation can occur separately, it is not uncommon for the two to go hand-and-hand. Dissociation typically results in overtime from an ordered system falling apart due to lack of routine maintenance updates or from a catastrophic event leading to data loss. If an inventory is not regularly updated it could become easy for a single, or several, glass plates to go missing. Regular inventory maintenance can also serve as a deterrent against theft. Ensuring glass plates are locked and stored where only designated museum staff can access them is the best preventative measure against theft.

=== Water and pests ===
Deterioration in glass is often directly related to moisture, from humidity or direct contact. Enough moisture over time will result in the chemical composition of the image to change. In the 1990s, The United States National Archive began to notice that some glass plates featured in their collection, on the non-photo bearing side of the scale, a crystalline deposit, known as sick-glass, was present.

If a glass plate has been subject to large amounts of moisture, it could grow mold on the plate's emulsion. Mold will eat away at the emulsion and attract other living pests. Insects will be more likely to appear in areas already compromised by inappropriate storage conditions. Insects will produce waste materials that, like dust, build up over time, causing further damage. Pests eat glass plate storage materials such as paper envelopes or cardboard boxes.

=== Light ===
Photographic plates and all photographic materials are susceptible to light. Extensive and ongoing exposure to light can cause significant and irreversible deterioration. Sunlight is the type of light most damaging to photographic plates. However, indoor lighting and other forms of UV lighting all pose a threat to photographic plates, causing fading and yellowing. Light is especially threatening to color photographic materials as it causes accelerated fading of the color dyes. Exposure to light could lead to deterioration and discoloration of the pigments present on the plate.

=== Pollutants and fire ===
Air pollution can threaten photographic plates through poor air quality and dirt that can damage the materials. This can include dust and gaseous pollution in an urban environment. Air pollution can cause fading of photographic materials. If a plate is subject to poor air quality, debris removal must be done with care using a cotton cloth; if done incorrectly, the glass might be subject to abrasions. Other sources of air pollution include "photocopying machines, construction materials, paint fumes, cardboard, carpets, and janitorial supplies".

Fire can cause severe damage to photographic glass plates. The heat produced by a fire can aid in increasing the chemical decomposition rate of the plate's emulsion. Pollutants in the air produced by the fire—such as smoke and debris—can also attach to or rest upon plates. The same care should be taken removing trash from the aftermath of a fire that would be used to remove dust and other air pollutants.

=== Material and chemical ===
The glass composition of photographic plates can be a factor of deterioration. Due to poor quality or an inherent fragility, "sick glass" can occur. Environmental conditions are usually linked to the increase or presence of this glass corrosion. The effect of "sick glass" can be weeping and crizzling caused by excessive alkali and a lack of stabilizers. Weeping involves droplets forming on the glass that appear as tiny crystals. This deterioration is especially threatening to cased photographs because the cover glass could be corroded and damage the image underneath. Corrosion of the glass plate support can also damage the image layer by causing the lifting of the binder and varnish layers.

The other chemical components of glass-plate negatives can also be threatening agents of deterioration. For instance, the silver image layer could undergo oxidative deterioration, leading to fading and discoloration. Additionally, the collodion binder itself is made up of cellulose nitrate, which is known to be a highly flammable compound. Most of these agents of deterioration are the result of poor chemical processing as a result of inherent frgility, but poor environmental and storage conditions usually accelerate them.

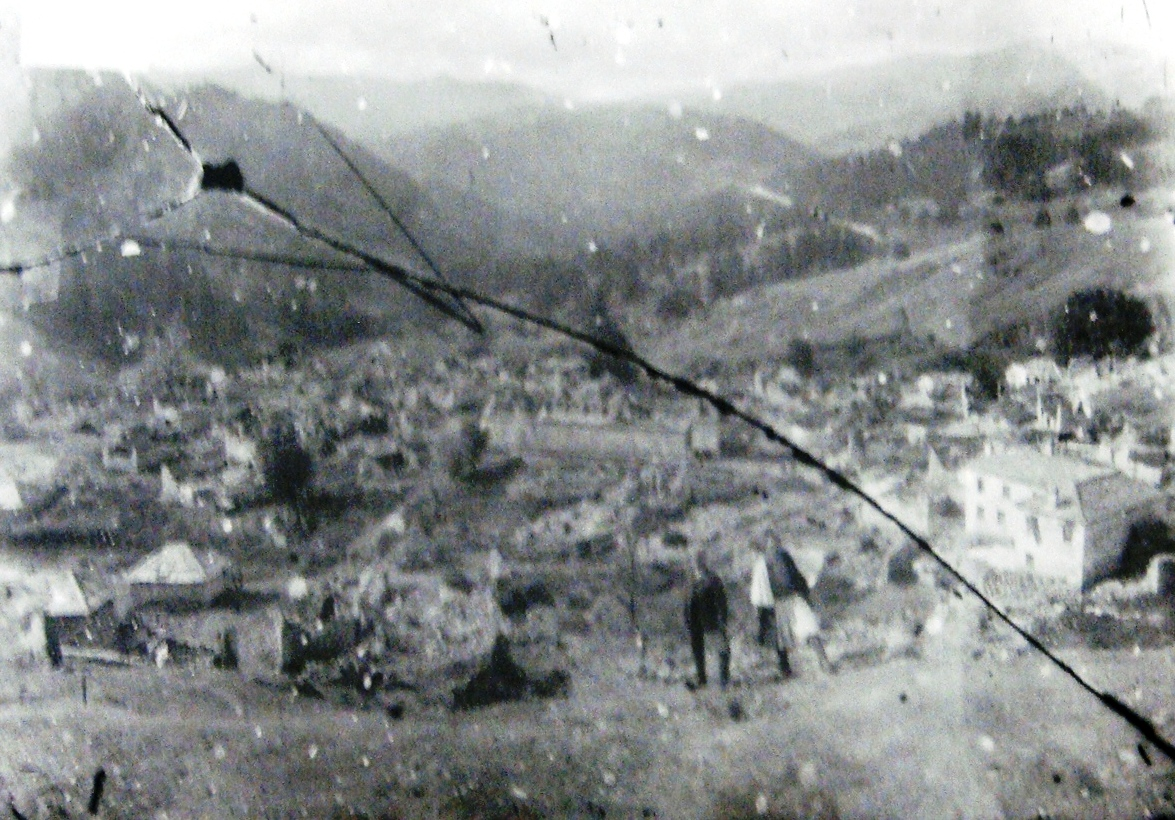
Broken glass plate – Avdella, izgorena, 1905

=== Physical ===
Glass plates are relatively stable dimensionally but also very fragile and brittle. Glass is highly susceptible to breakage, cracks, and fractures. This can be caused by human error, including dropping or bumping the glass plate, or it can be caused by failure of storage equipment, housing, shelves, etc., which may lead to an impact against the glass. Different breakage and stress states affect the image layer and binder differently.

Types of breakage:

- Impact Break: Point of impact and surrounding radiating arcs.
- Cracks: Running perpendicular to applied stress.
- Blind Cracks: Breaks do not carry through the whole thickness of the glass.

== Preventive conservation ==
=== Environment ===
Environmental controls are a crucial part of the preservation of photographic glass plates. Relative humidity (RH), temperature, and light play a significant role in keeping the multiple materials in photographic glass plates maintained. The following environmentally regulatory measures are taken for their preservation:

- For photographic glass plates, the temperature is kept cool at approximately 65 °F (18 °C).
- RH levels are generally kept at 30–40%. If RH drops below 30%, the image binder of the glass plate will dehydrate. If RH rises above 40%, the glass will begin hydrating. For cased glass plate photographs, such as ambrotypes, RH levels are kept at 40–50% and the temperature between 65 and 68 °F (18 and 20 °C). These levels differ because of the case being at risk for embrittlement, brass mat, and glass deterioration.
- Though cold storage is safe for photographic plates, with proper acclimation periods to room temperature, frozen storage, unlike for film photography, is not recommended.
- Fluctuations, called "cycling", in RH and temperature should be avoided. Environmental fluctuations can contribute to mold growth, chemical deterioration including discoloration and yellowing, degradation of the silver halide crystals resulting in silver mirroring, and deterioration of the emulsion. Acceptable fluctuations include ± 2 degrees of temperature and ± 3% of relative humidity.
- Photographic glass plates, especially negatives, are preserved in dark enclosures due to their risk of deterioration when exposed to light, particularly UV and sunlight. If displayed, spot-lighting and uneven heating of the photographic plate is avoided. Light levels are kept below 50 lux.

=== Handling ===
Photographic glass plates are handled carefully to avoid physical or chemical deterioration and damage – the following measures aid in their preservation through proper handling:

- To prevent fingerprints, non-vinyl plastic gloves are worn when handling – either latex or nitrile. Cotton gloves are not recommended by conservators due to the possibility of glass easily slipping from the cotton material. Cotton gloves are also susceptible to snagging on the emulsion, if it is flaking, or on the edges of the glass support.
- When handling, a glass plate is not held by one edge or corner but by two opposite edges and always with two hands.
- the glass plate on a flat surface is always placed with the emulsion side up.
- Glass plates are never stacked nor have any pressure placed upon them. The sleeve or enclosure is labeled before placing the glass plate inside.
- Since glass plates are fragile and brittle, duplicates are created if a glass plate is to be used often for printing. This helps to minimize the threat of breakage of the original.

=== Storage ===
Storage of photographic glass plates is important to their preservation. Museums and other cultural institutions take the following measures to ensure their glass plates are properly housed:

- Photographic glass plates are housed in four-flap enclosures, emulsion side up. These four-flap buffered enclosures prevent a glass plate from being pulled in and out, which would cause further deterioration of the image from flaking and abrasions. The four-flap enclosure allows the glass plate to be accessed by unfolding the flaps without pulling the plate across any surface or material.
- The photographic glass plates are stored vertically on the long side of the plate in storage boxes whose material is free of acid, lignin, polyvinyl chloride (PVC), dye, sulfur, and alum. The acidity of any paper storage used should show a pH between 7 and 8.5. Glass plates should not be packed tightly and should not rub against each other. Each plate should be separated with stiffeners made of acid-free folder stock or cardboard to support the plate.
- Photographic glass plates stored in a partially filled box will have spacers, most likely acid-free corrugated paperboard, inserted to prevent significant bumping or moving.
- Glass plates larger than 10" x 12" are stored in legal-size boxes that are partially filled to prevent a box that is too heavy. The extra space in the box is filled with board or spacers to avoid shifting when jostled.
- Storage boxes of photographic glass plates are stored on a lower shelf, specifically below four feet. This helps prevent someone from lifting them down from above their head and dropping them from a great height.
- Each storage box of photographic glass plates should be labeled with words such as "Heavy", "Handle with Care", and "Caution: Contains Glass Negatives", so all with access to the collection know to be extra careful when lifting the box off a shelf.
- When there are concerns about the reactivity of housing materials, the Photographic Activity Test (PAT) by the Image Permanence Institute should be consulted. The use of the PAT is a standard in the preservation of photographic plates. The PAT "explores the possibility of chemical interactions between photographs and a given material after prolonged contact".
- It is considered best practice to use steel shelving to store photographic plates. It is not recommended to use wood cabinets or crates. Wood shelves are susceptible to termites and are more prone to trigger chemical reactions with the plates. Wood shelves tend to possess finishes, paints, and glues that cause off-gassing. Acetic acid and formaldehyde build-up are also more likely to occur. Lastly, given the weight of the photographic plates, it is more problematic that the relative weakness of wood shelving can hold the weight of the collection.

==== Storage of broken photographic plates ====
Broken or cracked glass plates are stored specially, separate from other photographic plates, and in the following ways:

- Broken glass plates are stored flat, unlike intact plates stored vertically. Stacking broken plates only five plates high is recommended due to the plates' weight. This will prevent further breakage and damage.
- Photographic glass plates with cracked or damaged binder are stored on sink-mats. Those with minor flaking are still housed in the four-flap enclosure that is labeled appropriately, describing the damage. Glass plates with extensive flaking are stored on sink-mats horizontally and placed in a storage box with a label that reads "Caution: Broken glass. Carry Horizontally."
- Broken glass plate shards are "sandwiched" in between two pieces of buffered board and placed inside the four-flap enclosure.
- AIC advises that form-fit support should be created for broken glass shards by cutting out two pieces of 4-ply mat board that fit each shard. These pieces are then glued to each side of the buffered board with either wheat starch paste or 3M #415 double-stick tape, placing each shard in between the form-fit support to help prevent further damage. These broken shards are then placed in individual four-flap enclosures and stored flat, with appropriate labeling that warns of their broken condition.
- Another method of storing broken shards is to place them on sink mats. If this method is used, each piece is separated with paperboard spacers to prevent the pieces from touching. These paperboard spacers are sometimes attached with adhesives to the mat so that physical damage does not occur to the shards. They are stored horizontally and placed in a storage box with a label that reads "Caution: Broken glass. Carry Horizontally."

=== Maintenance/housekeeping ===
Maintenance/housekeeping of photographic plates requires minimal intervention:

- Light cleaning of plates is carried out occasionally by removing dust with a soft brush for their preservation. To dust the emulsion side, it is best to use an unused paint brush and, very gently, brush from the center to the outside of the plate. To clean the underside of the leaf (non-emulsion side), dip a cotton ball or cotton round into a cup of distilled water, and work from the middle of the plate to the outside. Water on the emulsion side will wash the emulsion away, causing the image to be lost forever, be careful to ensure this cleaning treatment is only used on the glass support underside and not the emulsion side of the plate.
- Conservators should also keep the surrounding collections area clean of dust, pests, and any other debris that may attract pests. Food and drink should not be permitted in the storage area as they attract pests. To prevent deterioration from air pollutants, it is helpful to have the air entering the storage area filtered and purified, windows closed, obsolete/outdated media minimized, and enclosures and cabinets in use to protect collection objects.

== Conservation treatment ==
Many broken or cracked glass plates may benefit from conservation treatment. There are various actions taken in reassembling and restoring these plates using the following materials and methods:

=== Handling ===
- Conservators tend to wear Neoprene gloves to help protect the emulsion from fingerprints that will cause deterioration over time. They avoid handling glass fragments to help prevent further breaking of the glass. A padded (foamed polyethylene) and tight weave tissue or Sintered Teflon lined box are preferred by conservators to store fragments, as they help prevent further breaking or cracking.

=== Adhesives ===
Conservators use various adhesives; each adhesive type has benefits and disadvantages for different situations.

- Paraloid B-72 – A solution of 50–70% B-72 in a solvent with added silica is used to reassemble glass plate fragments. It takes 1–2 hours to dry. One issue with this adhesive is that it creates "snowflakes" in between pieces, making an invisible reassembly impossible.
- Epoxy resin – This adhesive is powerful and has minimal shrinkage. An issue with this method is that it yellows over time and is not advisable to be used on glass plates with a collodion binder. This is due to the potential damage to the collodion binder of the reversibility method.
- Cyanoacrylates – This adhesive bonds firmly with alkaline surfaces but is very brittle and is only used for temporary repairs.
- Pressure-sensitive tape – This adhesive type is ubiquitous, easy to use, and completely removable but only provides minimal support.
- Sticky wax – As the pieces are assembled, sticky resin, such as that used for lost wax casting in jewelry making, is handy for holding the shards in place.

=== Backing material ===
- Silpat sheet – This is made of silicone and fibreglass; textured and provides air pockets to prevent damage from the capillary application; it does not traumatize the emulsion side of the glass.
- Secondary support – This method is used for glass plates broken into many pieces or over 5 by 7 inches (130 mm × 180 mm) in size. A second piece of glass is used with silicone to be inserted as a barrier layer.

=== Application ===
- Wicking – This is used by conservators to apply the adhesive to the glass with a wooden or glass applicator. A capillary tube or bottle puts the appropriate amount of glue on the glass shard without excess.
- Direct application – When repairing a broken plate on an inclined plane, conservators apply the adhesive to the fracture interface. The shard is placed directly next to its corresponding bit on the inclined plane.

=== Repair methods and techniques ===
- Photoshop Software assembly – Virtually assembling broken glass shards through Photoshop, after scanning or photographing all pieces, is used by conservators. Once all the details are within Photoshop, conservators will construct a copy of the glass plate by moving and rotating the parts until the glass plate is fully assembled. This allows conservators to understand how the glass plate should be reconstructed while avoiding further damage to the glass plate. This method allows for further research and study of the plate without the risk of further injury through continual handling.
- Inclined assembly – This method involves applying an adhesive to the glass shard interfaces and assembling them on an inclined surface covered with Mylar or Silpat. The glass shards are reassembled by direct application, which involves applying the adhesive directly to the shard interface and attaching it to its corresponding piece or assembling through wicking.
- Vertical assembly – This method is used because the glass shards fit back together most accurately vertically. This also helps to protect the side of the binder layer. The adhesive is not applied until all the pieces are assembled, enabling conservators to recognize any misalignment before an adhesive is applied. As the last step, the adhesive is applied through wicking.
- Light-line – This is often used to ensure all pieces are aligned, allowing a conservator to see any misalignment, which would show as a crooked line. Once the details are aligned, the light bar will be straight again.

=== Projects ===
The vertical assembly method along with a light line is used in The Glass Plate Negative Project at the Heritage Conservation Centre, as outlined in the case study. This study shows how conservators also deal with other conservation issues, including accretions and residue. For instance, while the plates were considered structurally stable, they may have needed surface cleaning. This was completed by using swabs dampened with water/ethanol solutions to reduce stains or do away with any tape residue. Pressure-sensitive labels were removed mechanically. Conservators used Whatman lens tissues to wipe off any other residue marks.
