= Block-matching and 3D filtering =

Algorithm for noise reduction in images

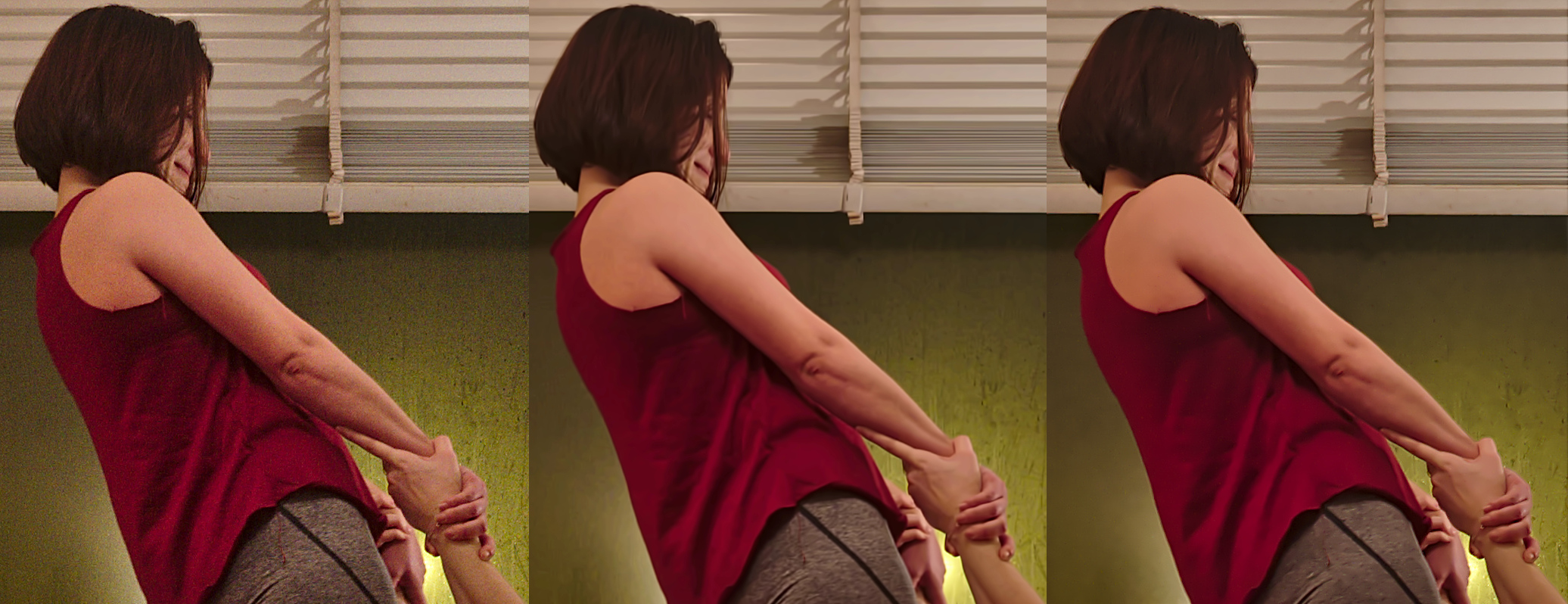
Left: original crop from raw image taken at ISO800, Middle: Denoised using bm3d-gpu (sigma=10, twostep), Right: Denoised using darktable 2.4.0 profiled denoise (non-local means and wavelets blend)

Block-matching and 3D filtering (BM3D) is a 3-D block-matching algorithm used primarily for noise reduction in images. It is one of the expansions of the non-local means methodology. There are two cascades in BM3D: a hard-thresholding and a Wiener filter stage, both involving the following parts: grouping, collaborative filtering, and aggregation. This algorithm depends on an augmented representation in the transformation site.

== Method ==
=== Grouping ===
Image fragments are grouped together based on similarity, but unlike standard k-means clustering and such cluster analysis methods, the image fragments are not necessarily disjoint. This block-matching algorithm is less computationally demanding and is useful later on in the aggregation step. Fragments do however have the same size. A fragment is grouped if its dissimilarity with a reference fragment falls below a specified threshold. This grouping technique is called block-matching, it is typically used to group similar groups across different frames of a digital video, BM3D on the other hand may group macroblocks within a single frame. All image fragments in a group are then stacked to form 3D cylinder-like shapes.

=== Collaborative filtering ===
Filtering is done on every fragments group. A $d+1$ dimensional linear transform is applied, followed by a transform-domain shrinkage such as Wiener filtering, then the linear transform is inverted to reproduce all (filtered) fragments.

=== Aggregation ===
The image is transformed back into its two-dimensional form. All overlapping image fragments are weight-averaged to ensure that they are filtered for noise yet retain their distinct signal.

== Extensions ==
=== Color images ===
RGB images can be processed much like grayscale ones. A luminance-chrominance transformation should be applied to the RGB image. The grouping is then completed on the luminance channel which contains most of the useful information and a higher SNR. This approach works because the noise in the chrominance channels is strongly correlated to that of the luminance channel, and it saves approximately one-third of the computing time because grouping takes up approximately half of the required computing time.

=== Deblurring ===
The BM3D algorithm has been extended (IDD-BM3D) to perform decoupled deblurring and denoising using the Nash equilibrium balance of the two objective functions.

=== Convolutional neural network ===
An approach that integrates a convolutional neural network has been proposed and shows better results (albeit with a slower runtime). MATLAB code has been released for research purpose.

== Implementations ==
- Reference implementation in MATLAB and Python released under an open-source proprietary license: BM3D
- Well documented C-based implementation released under the GPLv3: bm3d
- CUDA and C++ based implementation released under the GPLv3: bm3d-gpu
