= Digital photograph restoration =

Restoration of media using digital techniques

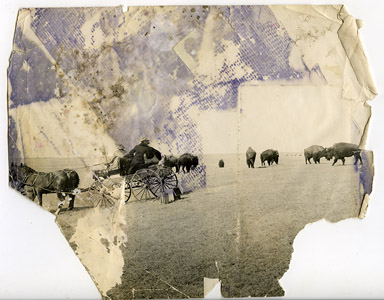
A damaged 1870 photograph

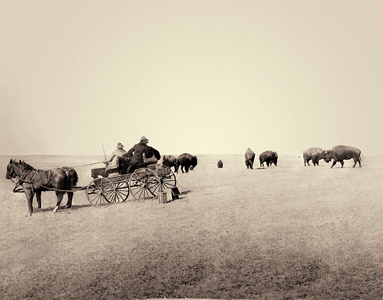
The same image restored, extrapolating details beyond the margins of the original

Digital photograph restoration is the practice of restoring the appearance of a digital copy of a physical photograph that has been damaged by natural, man-made, or environmental causes, or affected by age or neglect.

Digital photograph restoration uses image editing techniques to remove undesired visible features, such as dirt, scratches, or signs of aging. People use raster graphics editors to repair digital images, or to add or replace torn or missing pieces of the physical photograph. Unwanted color casts are removed and the image's contrast or sharpening may be altered to restore the contrast range or detail believed to have been in the original physical image. Digital image processing techniques included in image enhancement and image restoration software are also applied to digital photograph restoration.

== Digitization of source photographs ==
Technical standards for digitizing photographic prints and negatives are applied in preparing materials for digital restoration. In practice the original is scanned at high resolution and saved in formats such as TIFF or PNG. These standards set general requirements for the quality of the digital capture of cultural materials.

== Background ==
=== Agents of deterioration ===
Photographic material is susceptible to physical, chemical and biological damage caused by physical forces, thieves and vandals, fire, water, pests, pollutants, light, incorrect temperature, incorrect relative humidity, and dissociation (custodial neglect). Traditionally, preservation efforts focused on physical photographs, but preservation of a photograph's digital surrogates has become of equal importance.

=== Handling practices ===
Fragile or valuable originals are protected when digital surrogates replace them, and severely damaged photographs that cannot be repaired physically are revitalized when a digital copy is made. Creation of digital surrogates allows originals to be preserved. However, the digitization process itself contributes to the object's wear and tear. It is considered important to ensure the original photograph is minimally damaged by environmental changes or careless handling.

=== Permissible uses ===
Digitally scanned or captured images, both unaltered and restored image files are protected under copyright law. Courts agree that by its basic nature digitization involves reproduction—an act exclusively reserved for copyright owners. The ownership of an artwork does not inherently carry with it the rights of reproduction.

Images that are digitally reproduced and restored often reflect the intentions of the photographer of the original photograph. It is not recommended that conservators changes or add additional information based on personal or institutional bias or opinion. Even without copyright permission, museums can digitally copy and restore images for conservation or informational purposes.

== Gallery ==
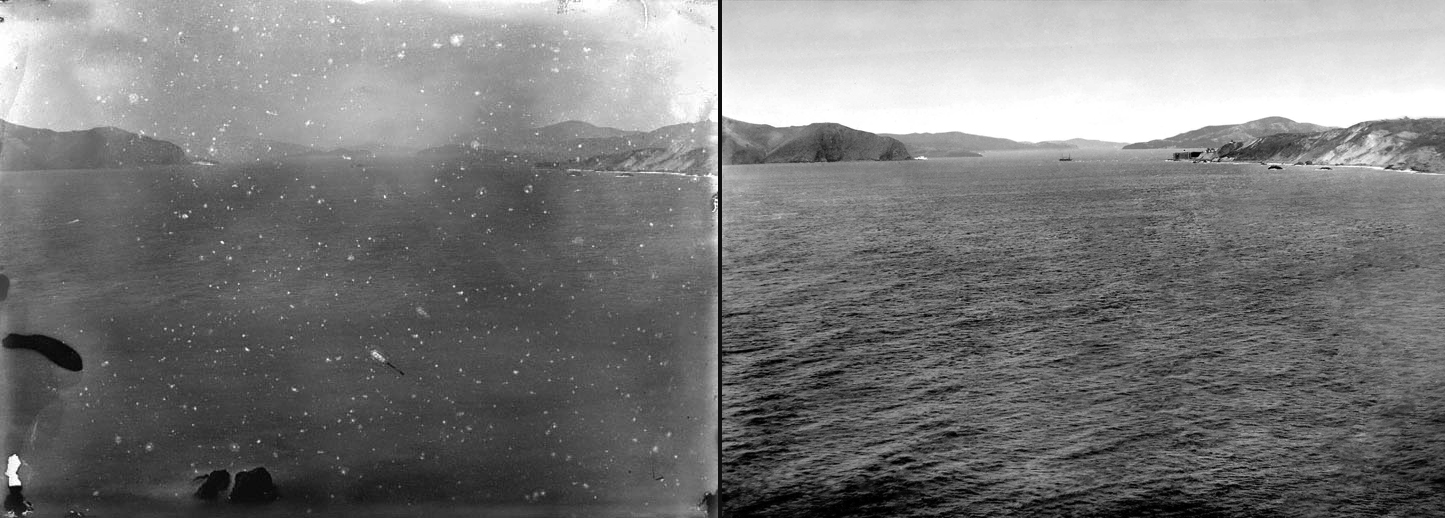
Example of the digital image restoration of a severely water and mildew damaged 5x7 inch glass photographic plate of the Golden Gate in San Francisco, California, taken about 1895 from "Land's End" in Lincoln Park on the Northwest tip of the San Francisco Peninsula

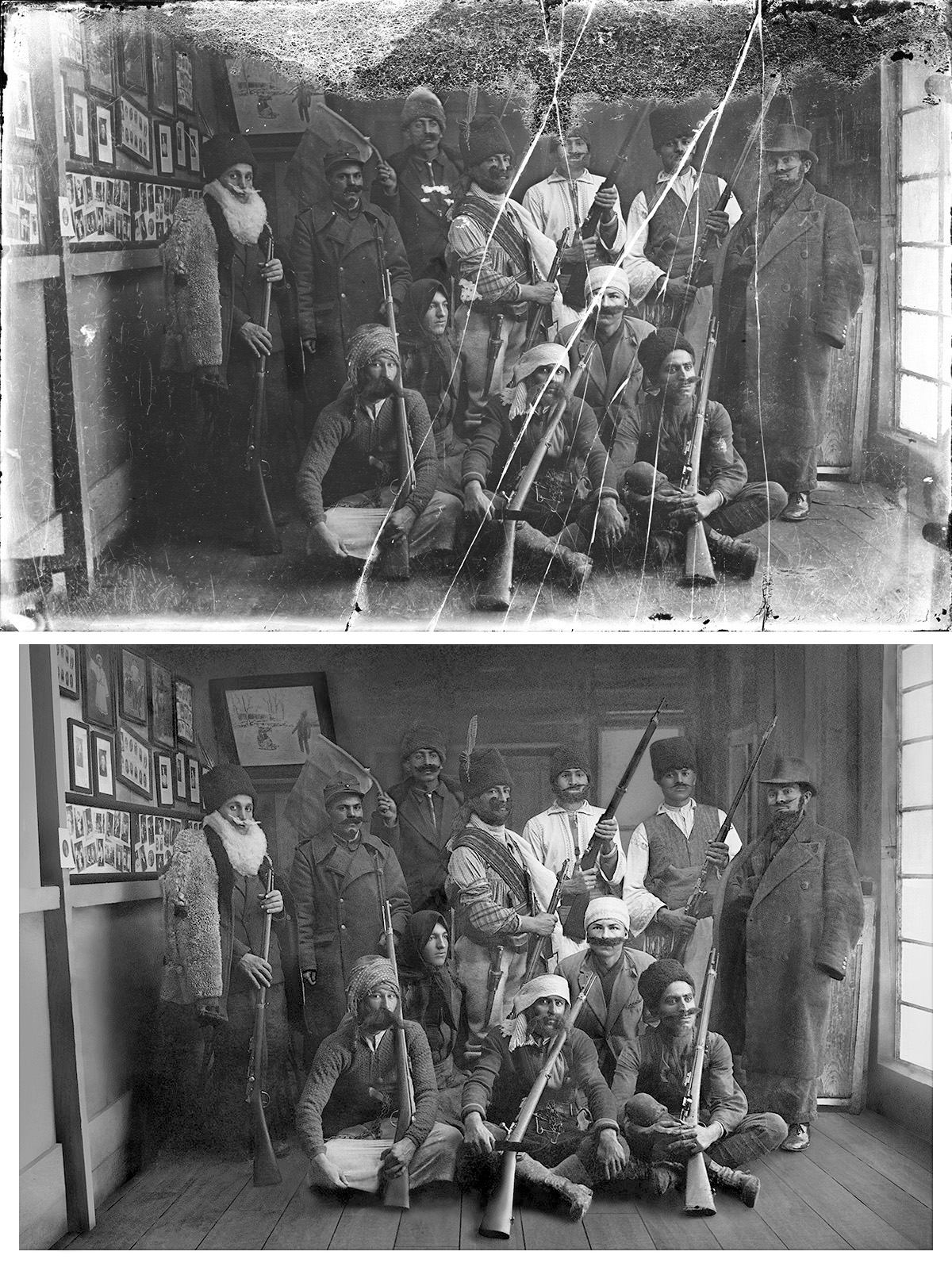
Digital construction and restoration of a badly damaged photograph from Costică Acsinte Archive

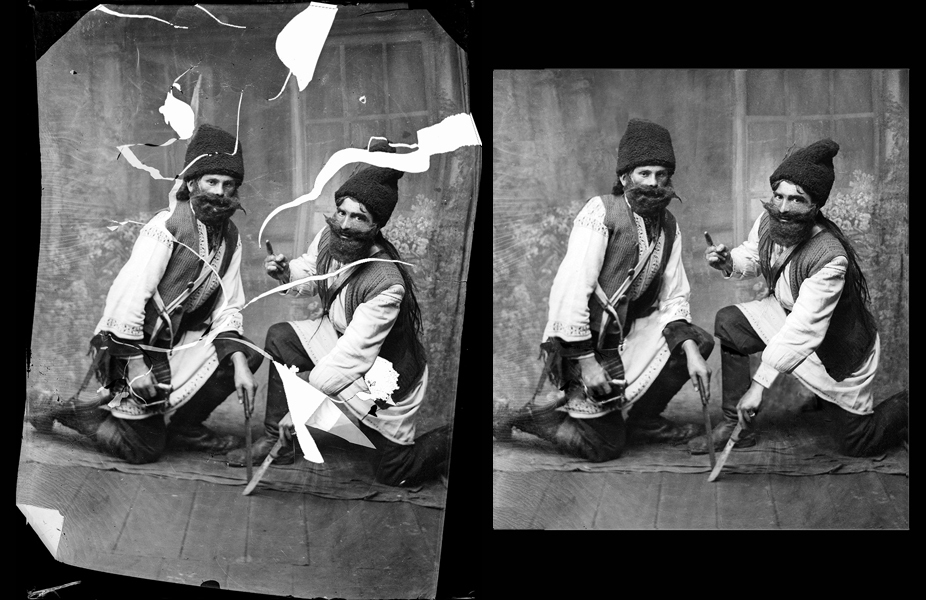
An example of digital image reconstruction and restoration of the image "Doi călușari"

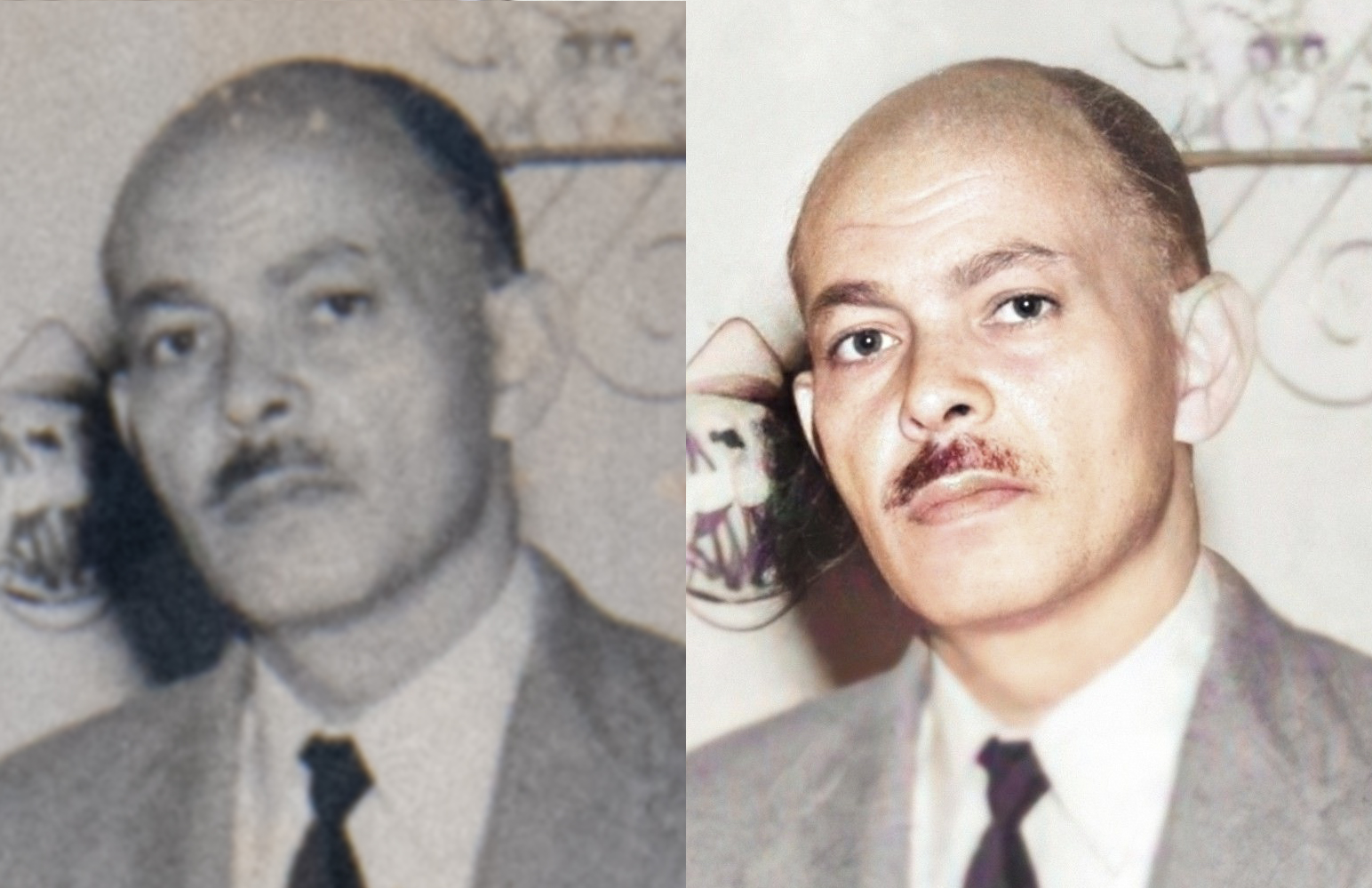
Image enhancement using artificial intelligence

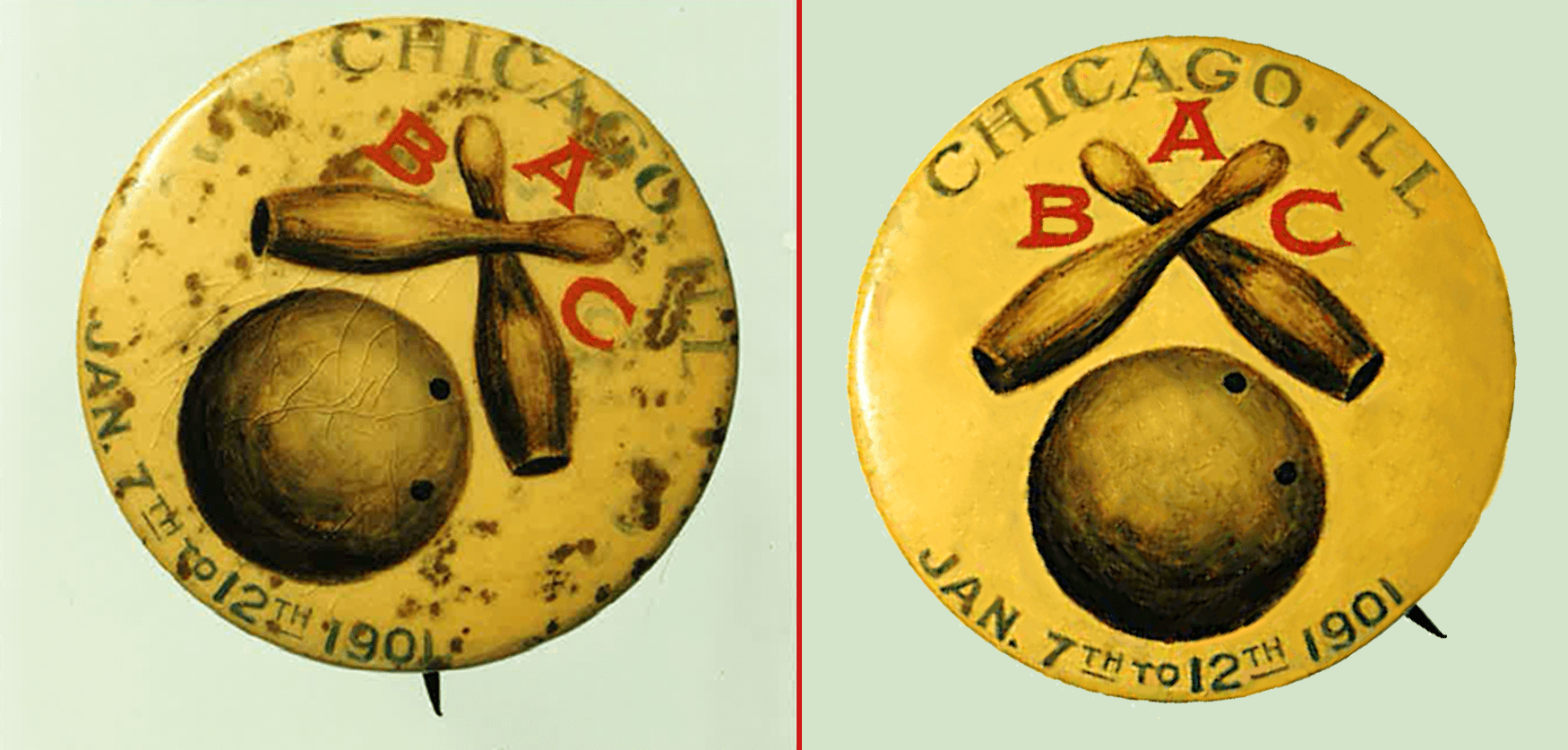
An image editing program's spot healing and brush functions can remove defects from historical subjects

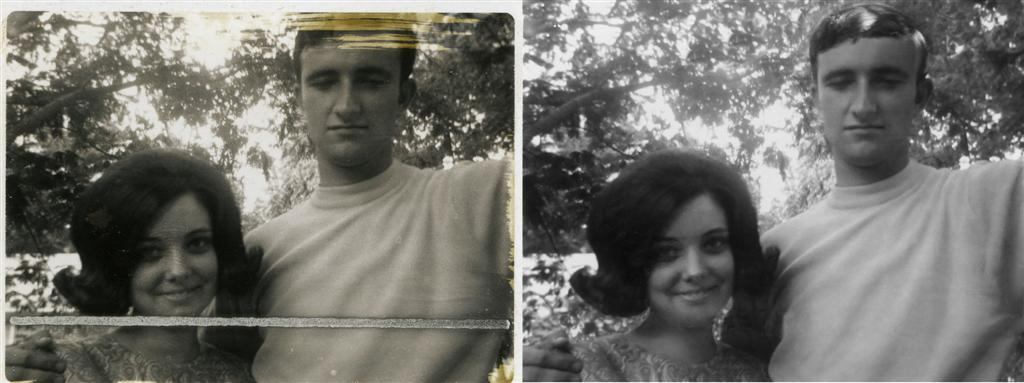
A restoration project that interpolates features within the frame of the original, including the man's hair and shirt texture.

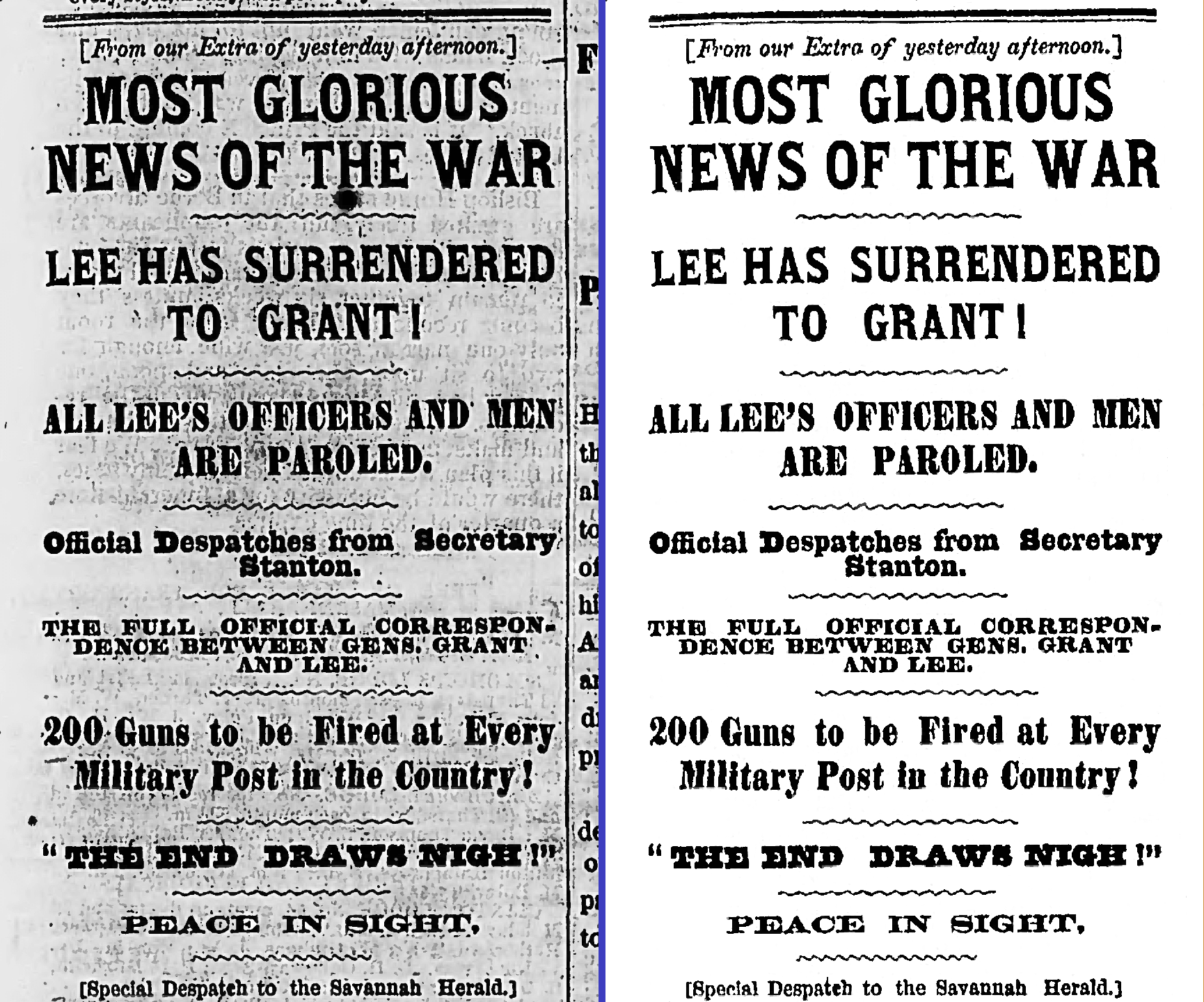
Photographs of documents may be restored, as in this 1865 newspaper clipping, using brightness and contrast and sharpness adjustments, and de-speckling.

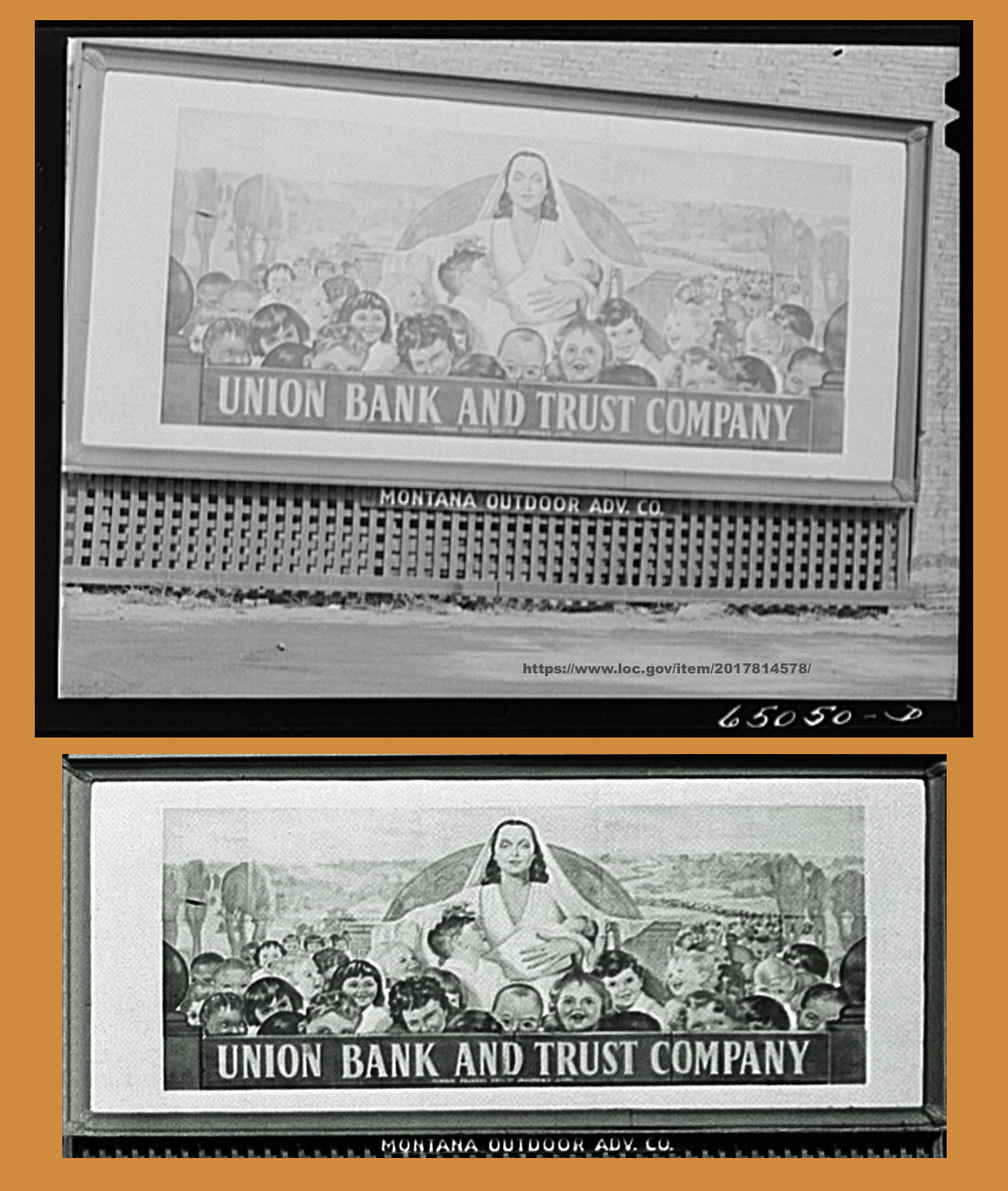
Photograph (1942) of a roadside sign has slant and foreshortening issues corrected with rotating and 'skew' functions. Brightness, contrast, and sharpness adjustments enhance distinctness.

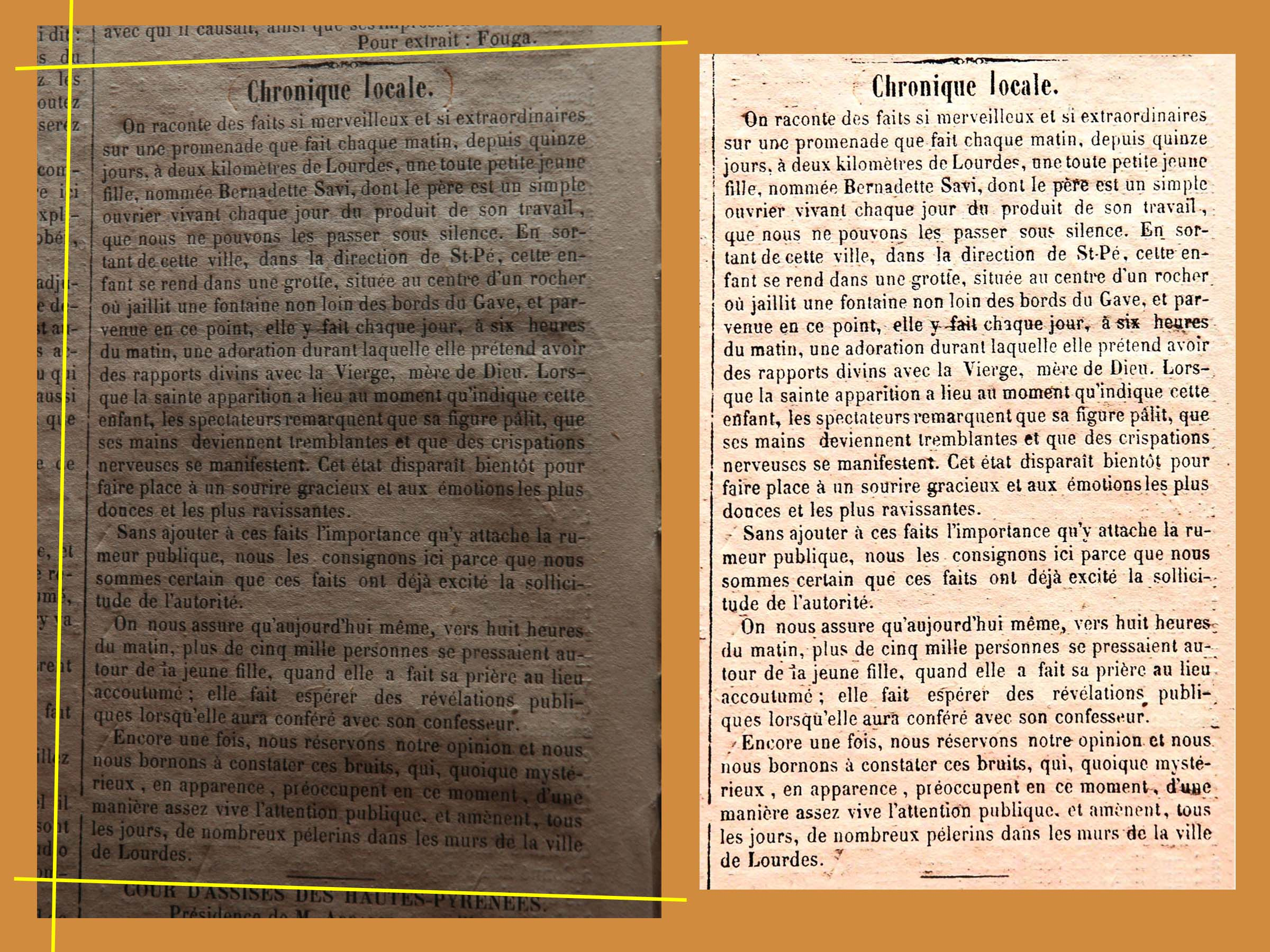
Photograph of 1858 newspaper article had skewing and foreshortening issues (shown with yellow lines not in original), and presented gross variations in lighting. Image was corrected by skewing tool, and by adjusting lighting and midtone contrast.

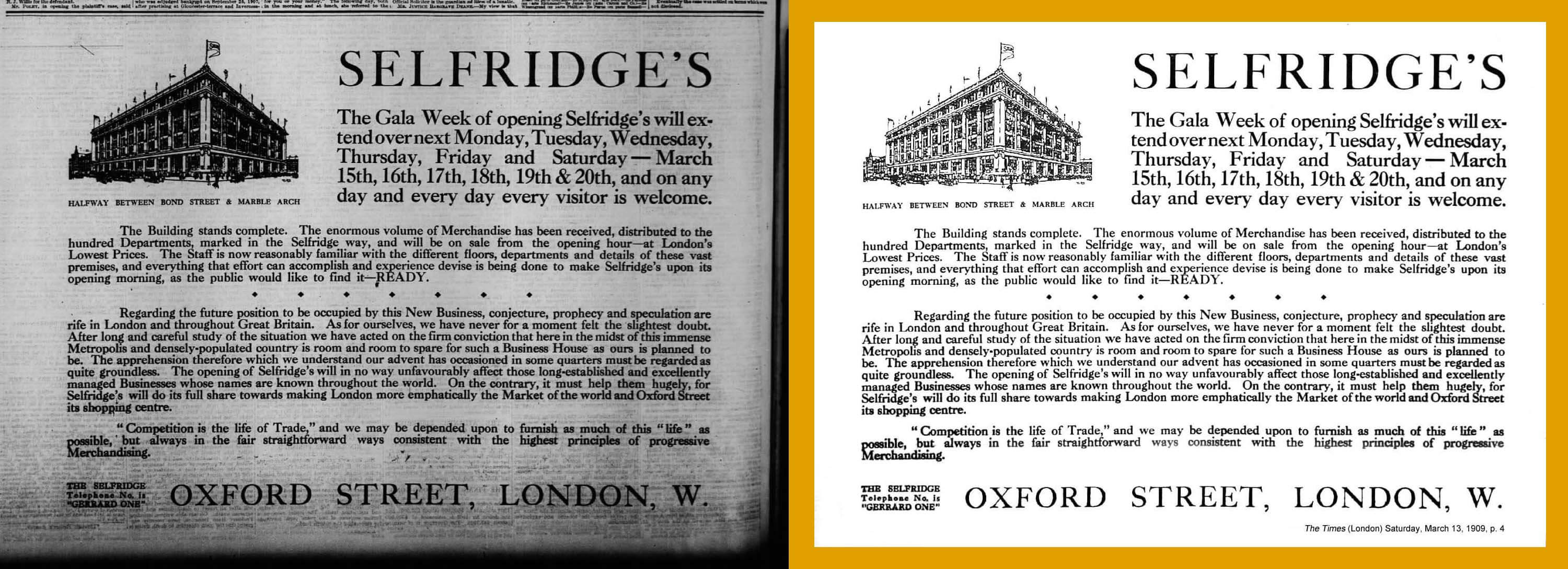
Newspaper ad (1909) had bleed-through of ink from opposite side of sheet, and a wide range of darkness. Software corrections included adjustment of relative tone levels followed by brightness+contrast adjustment and edge enhancement, and despeckling. Image and text were handled separately.

== See also ==
- Infrared cleaning
- Media preservation
- Photo manipulation
- Photograph preservation
