= Impulse =

Impulse or Impulsive may refer to:

== Science ==
- Impulse (physics), the change of momentum of an object; the integral of a force with respect to time
- Impulse function, a mathematical function of an infinitely high amplitude and infinitesimal duration
- Impulse response, a system's output when presented with the impulse function in electrical engineering
- Impulse (psychology), a wish or urge, particularly a sudden one
- Impulsion, a thrust of a horse

== Film and television ==
- Impulse (1954 film), a thriller starring Arthur Kennedy
- Impulse (1974 film), a thriller starring William Shatner
- Impulse (1984 film), a science fiction film starring Meg Tilly and Tim Matheson
- Impulse (1990 film), a thriller starring Theresa Russell
- Impulse (2008 film), a thriller starring Angus Macfadyen
- Impulse (2010 film), an apocalyptic thriller starring Chris Masterson
- Impulse (TV series), a 2018 science fiction series on YouTube Premium
- "Impulse" (Star Trek: Enterprise), a TV episode
  - Impulse drive, a fictional form of propulsion in the Star Trek universe

== Print media ==
- Impulse (German magazine)
- Impulse (Gould novel), 2013
- Impulse (Hopkins novel), a 2007 young adult verse novel by Ellen Hopkins
- Impulse (Psionex), a Marvel Comics character
- Impulse (DC Comics), a superhero
- Science Fantasy (magazine), also published as Impulse and SF Impulse

== Music ==
- Impulse (band), a Bulgarian hard rock group
- Impulse! Records, a jazz recording label
- Impulse (Buck Hill album), 1995
- Impulse Drum and Bugle Corps
- Impulse (Erra album), 2011
- "Impulse", a song by Northlane from Node, 2015
- "Impulsive" (song), 1990, by Wilson Phillips

== Business ==
- Impulse Airlines, a former Australian airline
- Impulse (retailer), a UK entertainment retail chain
- Isuzu Impulse, an automobile sold from 1981 through to 1992
- Impulse (body mist), made by Unilever
- Impulse (software), a digital game distribution system
- Impulse purchase (also impulse buying), unplanned buying of goods

== Other ==
- Impulse 21, an American sailboat design
- Impulse (dinghy), a 4.0 m sports sailing dinghy
- Impulse (roller coaster), at Knoebels Amusement Resort in Pennsylvania
- Impulsivity

== See also ==
- Impulse noise (disambiguation)
- Specific impulse, a propulsion efficiency measurement
- Irresistible impulse, a legal defense
