= Impulse noise (acoustics) =

Concept in acoustics

Impulse noise is a category of (acoustic) noise that includes unwanted, almost instantaneous (thus impulse-like) sharp sounds (like clicks and pops)—typically caused by electromagnetic interference, scratches on disks, gunfire, explosions, and synchronization issues in digital audio. High levels of such a noise (200+ decibels) may damage internal organs, while impulses exceeding 180 decibels begin to present a risk of rupturing the tympanic membrane if hearing protection is not worn. The U.S. Department of Defense has established criteria for equipment that produces impulse noise at levels above 140 dB peak SPL and requires hearing protection be worn to prevent damage human ears.

An impulse noise filter can enhance the quality of noisy signals to achieve robustness in pattern recognition and adaptive control systems. A classic filter used to remove impulse noise is the median filter, at the expense of signal degradation. Thus it's quite common to get better performing impulse noise filters with model-based systems, which are programmed with the time and frequency properties of the noise to remove only impulse obliterated samples.

== See also ==
- Audio synchronizer
- Crackling noise
- Rustle noise
- Click (acoustics)
- Record restoration
- Gaussian noise
- High-frequency impulse-measurement
