= Click (acoustics) =

Sonic artifact

A click is a sonic artifact in sound and music production, characteristically impulse-like, that is to say, an almost instantaneous, sharp, anharmonic sound.

== Analog recording artifact ==
Vinyl clicking noise

On magnetic tape recordings, clicks can occur when switching from magnetic play to record in order to correct recording errors and when recording a track in sections. On phonograph records, clicks are perceived in various ways by the listener, ranging from tiny 'tick' noises which may occur in any recording medium through 'scratch' and 'crackle' noise commonly associated with analog disc recording methods. Analog clicks can occur due to dirt and dust on the grooves of the vinyl record or granularity in the material used for its manufacturing, or through damage to the disc from scratches on its surface.

== Digital recording artifact ==
In digital recording, clicks (not to be confused with the click track) can occur due to multiple issues. When recording through an audio interface, insufficient computer performance or audio driver issues can cause clicks, pops and dropouts. They can result from improper clock sources and buffer size. Also, clicks can be caused by electric devices near the computer or by faulty audio or mains cables. In sample recording, digital clicks occur when the signal levels of two adjacent audio sections do not match. The abrupt change in gain can be perceived as a click. In electronic music, clicks are used as a musical element, particularly in glitch and noise music, for example in the Clicks & Cuts Series (2000–2010).

== Speech noise ==
Audio recording of a male voice with speech clicks

The same recording with clicks digitally removed

In speech recording, click noises (not to be confused with click consonants) result from tongue movements, swallowing, mouth and saliva noises. While in voice-over recordings, click noises are undesirable, they can be used as a sound effect of close-miking in ASMR and pop music, e.g. in Bad Guy (2019) by Billie Eilish.

== Click removal ==
In audio restoration and audio editing, hardware and software de-clickers provide click removal or de-clicking features. A spectrogram can be used to visually detect clicks and crackles (corrective spectral editing).

== See also ==
- Crackling noise
- Gaussian noise
- Impulse noise (acoustics)
- Record restoration
- Rustle noise
