= Impulse (comics) =

Impulse, in comics, may refer to:

- Impulse (DC Comics)
  - Kent Shakespeare
  - Bart Allen
  - Kid Flash (Iris West)
- Impulse (Marvel Comics), currently known as Pulsar

== See also ==
- Impulse (disambiguation)
