= Numark Pro TT-2 =

Family of DJ phonograph turntables

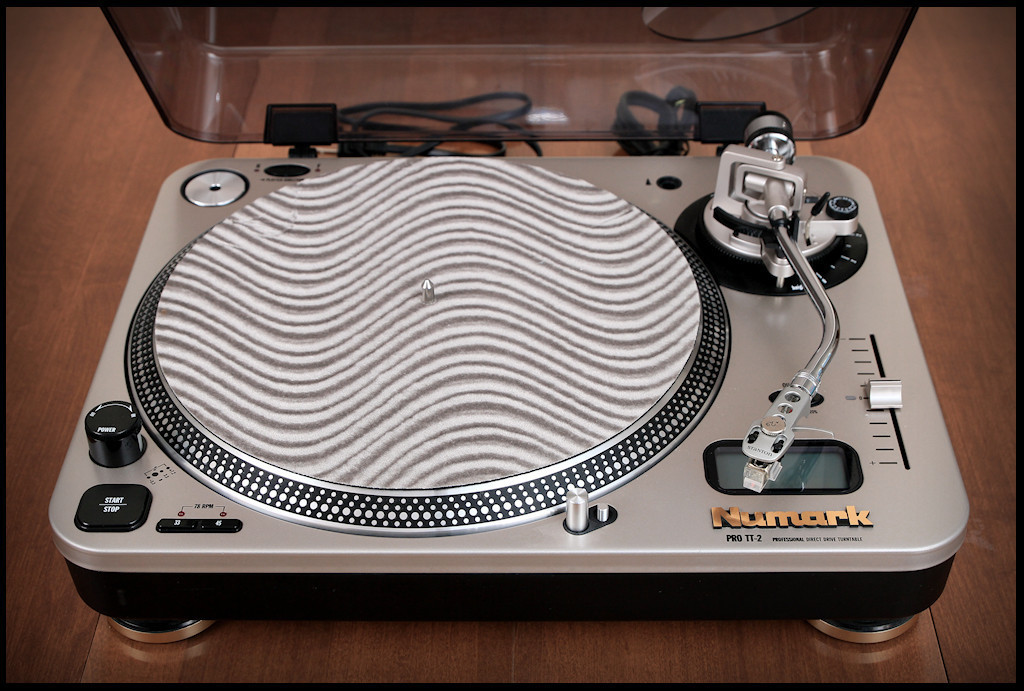
- Inception: circa 1999
- Manufacturer: Numark Industries, LP; Cumberland, RI 02864, U.S.A.
- Available: discontinued circa 2005
- Models: Pro TT-2, Pro TT-1+, Pro TT-1, TT-100
- Notes; Designed and manufactured by Hanpin Electron Co., Ltd. Tainan Hsien, Taiwan, R.O.C.

The Numark Pro TT-2, Pro TT-1+, Pro TT-1 and TT-100 were a family of private label, high-end, direct-drive DJ phonograph turntables sold by Numark during the late 1990s and early 2000s. Only in production for a few years, these models were among the early versions of the "Super OEM" manual DJ turntables made by the Hanpin Electron Co., Ltd. of Taiwan. The Pro TT-1, Pro TT-1+, and Pro TT-2 models incorporated an LCD on the top plate to show turntable settings, which included a unique 12-segment animated element to indicate platter rotation and direction.

The Pro TT-2, Pro TT-1+, Pro TT-1 and TT-100 were Numark's best turntables to date, rivaling the well-respected, more expensive Technics SL-1200 series turntables. The Numark turntables are three-speed, 33 1/3, 45, and 78 rpm, whereas the Technics SL-1200 series turntables support only 33 1/3 and 45 rpm, except for the three-speed SL-1200MK4 turntable, which was sold only in Japan. Although aimed at the DJ market, Numark's three-speed turntables are attractive to those working with early recordings needing a way to play 78 rpm records and radio transcription discs. Neither the Numark nor the Technics turntables are large enough to accept a 16-inch, 33 1/3 rpm transcription disc, but the two-speed JVC QL-Y5F turntable is just large enough for that purpose, and its electro-dynamic servo-controlled tonearm offers more stable tracking than conventional counterbalanced tonearms. However, designed for the discriminating audiophile, the QL-Y5F is only a two-speed turntable and lacks the features and ruggedness necessary for DJ use.

== Model distinction ==
The first two new turntable models Numark introduced, the TT-100 and the Pro TT-1, are similar, but the TT-100 was only available in a gloss black finish, has no LCD, tonearm height adjustment, and has less starting torque than the Pro TT-1. Both have a single range variable pitch control and weigh 24 pounds. Numark next released the Pro TT-1+ which added dual range variable pitch, +/−10% and +/-20%, and a platter speed output connector. The Pro TT-2 soon followed with a slightly different tonearm. The Pro TT-1+ and Pro TT-2 each weigh 27 pounds. All models have a remote start/stop connector. All are dual-voltage units and for the most part all contain the same internal parts.

== Design ==
The turntable plinth has a precision 16 gauge steel stamped top plate. The base appears to be a heavy composite plastic material with steel bars or plates added for additional weight. The platter is die-cast aluminum having a thickness of 0.110". At the center of the underside of the platter a 3.520" diameter, 0.210" thick, ceramic magnetic ring bonded to the platter is used to magnetically secure the platter to a 3.800" diameter steel plate on the spindle assembly. Two large finger holes in the platter are provided for lifting the platter off of the spindle. The platter and ceramic magnet assembly weighs 1.84 lbs. The integrated aluminum tonearm assembly includes the tonearm counterweight with stylus pressure ring, rest/clamp, lift lever, lift adjustment, plus calibrated anti-skate control, height, height lock, and tracking force adjustments. The tonearm rest/clamp and adjustment dials are plastic. The die-cast metal headshell is of the standard removable type. A generously sized LCD on the Pro models indicates speed setting, play/pause, pitch, quartz lock, and direction of platter rotation. The ground wire and audio output leads are permanently attached. A removable, hinged plastic dust cover was included.

The wow and flutter spec for the Numark Pro TT-2, Pro TT-1+, Pro TT-1 and TT-100 is 0.13%, which is high compared to the spec of 0.025% wrms for the Technics SL-1200MK2 and 0.025% wrms for the JVC QL-Y5F turntables. With the Numark turntables the only concentration of mass is at the center of the platter where the ceramic ring magnet is located. There is no extra mass provided at the circumference of the platter like found on the platters for the Technics and JVC turntables. So the Numark platter exhibits little inertia which is probably why the wow and flutter figure is not up to par. All of the Hanpin-made turntables seem to have an inordinately high wow and flutter spec, even their own top-of-the-line models, the DJ-5500 and DJ-3560. The only exception to this for Hanpin-made turntables seems to be the ReLoop RP-7000 and RP-8000 which claim a wow and flutter spec of 0.01% wrms. Possibly the ReLoop turntables have a greatly improved platter design to reduce axial run-out of the platter but no mention of that is made in the product literature. Excessive wow and flutter is probably a non-issue as a DJ, scratching and playing hip-hop. However, for audiophiles involved in record restoration, excessive wow and flutter is to be avoided.

== Issues ==
After the initial launch the Numark units received mixed reviews, with several flaws and inadequate quality assurance being pointed out. Some found the tonearm as supplied was not accurately calibrated or properly aligned with the platter, but it can be tweaked and adjusted to perform well. The platter in some cases exhibited noticeable warp or axial run-out, which appears to be in part due to the ceramic ring magnet that secures the platter to the spindle not being glued correctly to the underside of the platter. Some reviewers complained that the pitch system was not calibrated accurately, although not off by much. On later production models, probably the Pro TT-2 only, it is reported that access holes are provided on the bottom of the turntable base to permit pitch calibration using a screwdriver. Others considered the LCD to be of little practical value since the pitch value shown is not precise. Also, in some cases the stylus pressure ring on the tonearm counterbalance weight assembly turns much too freely. And, unfortunately, the dust cover hinges eventually fail due to cracking at the bottom of the plastic housing for the counterbalance spring which is under the constant load of the stiff spring. One failed hinge keeps the dust cover from staying open when raised.

While it is possible to use audio processing software to correct speed, it is much easier and more straightforward to use a turntable running at the correct speed to capture the recording. For those working with acoustic recordings, commonly referred to as early 78s, it would be very useful if the LCD displayed the actual platter speed in rpm to two decimal places in addition to the pitch variation in percentage since various acoustic gramophone records were made to rotate at speeds ranging from 60 to over 90 rpm, with most around 78 rpm, depending on the label or manufacturer. With the adoption of the Western Electric recording system in 1925, the speed was standardized to be 78.26 rpm. With a pitch range of +/−20%, or about 65 to 94 rpm, the Numark Pro TT1+ and Pro TT2 turntables cover the speed range for most acoustic records. The question does arise as to whether 78 rpm is 78, 78.26, or 78 1/3 rpm on the Numark turntables. Hence, having an accurate digital speed display would be beneficial.

== Pricing ==
The Numark Pro TT series of turntables was priced at $299 for the TT-100, $499 for the Pro TT-1 and Pro TT-1+, and $599 for the Pro TT-2. Before the Pro TT series was phased out due to the introduction of the next-generation TTX and TTXUSB turntables, Numark offered limited edition models of the Pro TT-1+ and Pro TT-2 with chrome finishes. Some versions had blue LED lights. Numark also released an MX edition of the Pro TT-2, which had a glossy all-black finish like the TT-100. The Pro TT series Numark turntables are now very hard to find, almost impossible to find "new". Online prices can range from US$99 to $400, depending on the condition and location.

== Alternative turntables ==
Three-speed DJ turntables offered by Audio-Technica, ReLoop, and Stanton, as well as Numark, are Hanpin descendants of the Numark Pro TT series. Examples are the Audio-Technica AT-LP120-USB and AT-PL120 at the lower end, and the Audio-Technica AT-LP1240-USB, Reloop RP-7000 and RP-8000 at the high end. The tonearm and plastic dust cover hinges remain the same. The direct-drive motor has been updated to a 16-pole motor. Most models now offered include a preamp with a line-level output as well as a USB output. A newer model offered by Numark, the TTXUSB direct drive turntable, made by Hanpin, features a LCD, three speeds, and a restyled plinth but it is not supplied with a dust cover. There are also other Hanpin turntables on the market in different regions of the world sold under various brand names.

== Features and specifications ==
- Fully Manual Turntable: 3 Speed, 33-1/3, 45, and 78 rpm, Direct Drive
- Turntable Platter: Aluminum Die-cast, 330mm Diameter
- Quartz Lock (0% pitch)
- Pitch Adjustment:
  +/-10% (Pro TT-100 and Pro TT-1)
  +/-10% and +/-20% (Pro TT-1+ and Pro TT-2)
- Platter Drive Motor: High Torque, 12 Pole, 3 Phase, Brushless DC Motor
- Starting Torque:
  more than 1.6kgf (TT-100)
  more than 2.2kgf.cm (Pro TT-1, Pro TT-1+, and Pro TT-2)
- High Torque Electronic Brake
- Start/Stop Button
- Forward/Reverse Platter Direction Button
- LCD (Pro TT-1, Pro TT-1+, and Pro TT-2):
  Play/Pause Mode
  Quartz Lock Mode
  Selected Platter Speed and Pitch Change Percentage
  Rotating 12 Segment Display (synchronized with platter direction and speed)
- Pop-up Stylus Target Light
- Platter Speed Strobe Light
- Tonearm Assembly:
  Static Balanced S-shaped Tonearm, 234mm Effective Length
  Standard Detachable Headshell
  Recommended Cartridge Weight 6-10g
  Counterweight with Stylus Pressure Dial
  Tracking Force 0-4g
  Anti-Skate Control 0-7g
  Height Adjustment and Lock (Pro TT-1, Pro TT-1+, and Pro TT-2)
  Tonearm Lift Lever
  Tonearm Rest and Clamp
- Outputs:
  Left, Right Audio Cables and Ground Wire (not detachable)
  Platter Speed (Pro TT-1+ and Pro TT-2)
  Remote Start/Stop
  Pitch 675±1 Hz at 33 1/3 rpm, 1170±1 Hz at 78 rpm (Pro TT-1+ and Pro TT-2)
- Wow and flutter: < 0.13%
- S/N ratio: > 55 dB (DIN-B)
- Output Channel Level Difference: < 2.3 dB
- Channel Separation: > 16 dB
- Extra Headshell Holder
- Aluminum 45 rpm Adapter and Holder
- Adjustable Feet (turn to level turntable)
- Counterbalanced Hinged Dust Cover
- Power: 110-127/220-240 Volts AC (select by switch under platter), 50-60 Hertz, 15 Watts
- Dimensions: 450mm/17.75" Wide x 352mm/13.75" Deep x 148.5mm/5.875" High
- Weight:
  10.8 kg/24 lb (TT-100 and Pro TT-1)
  12.45 kg/27.5 lb (Pro TT-1+ and Pro TT-2)
