= Bill Simon (musician) =

American songwriter, musician and music critic

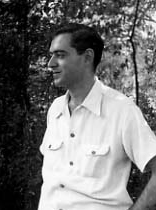

Background information
- Born: William L. Simon; July 1, 1920
- Died: August 20, 2000 (aged 80)
- Genre: jazz
- Occupations: music editor; songwriter; author; saxophonist
- Instrument: saxophone
- Years active: 1941–2000
- Label: Reader's Digest

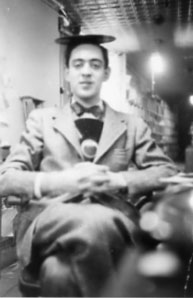
Bill Simon with a record on his head

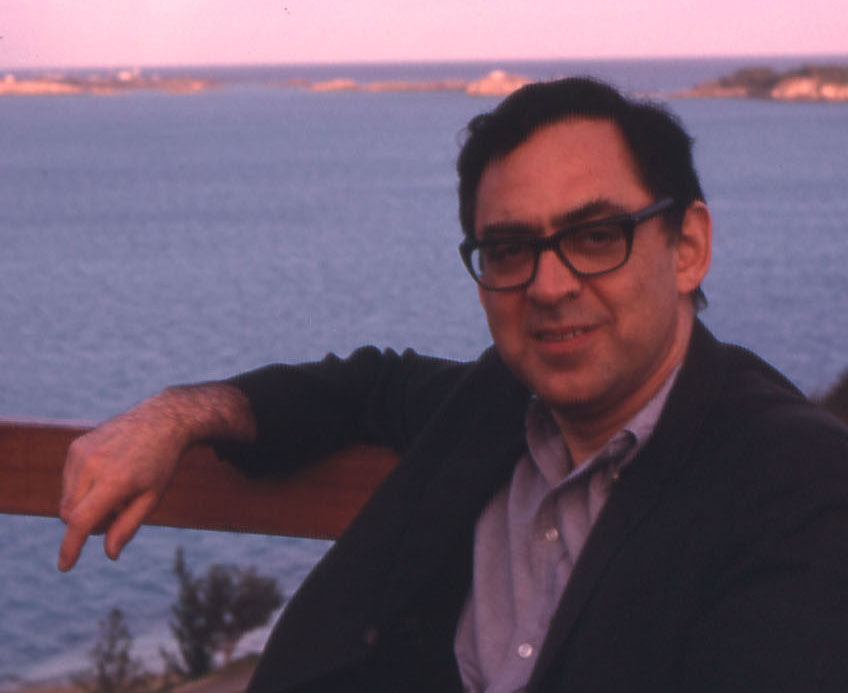

Bill Simon (July 1, 1920 – August 20, 2000) was an American songwriter, musician and music critic. He was a contributor to the music business in the mid-20th century, notably as a jazz commentator for Billboard Magazine and other publications.

His liner notes can still be found on many record albums of the era.

Raised in Springville, New York, Simon began his career in music in 1941 as the manager of his brother's record store in Buffalo, New York. In 1944 he moved to New York City and worked as a record salesman, record producer (he compiled the first Edith Piaf album issued in the USA) and jazz critic.

He discovered the jazz clarinetist Tony Scott; they shared an apartment for 5 years and Simon was Scott's first manager. They remained lifelong friends.

Simon spent several years (starting in 1955) as associate editor of Billboard Magazine and wrote a monthly column on jazz for The Saturday Review. He was manager and editor of the RCA Victor Popular Record Club, owned by the Book-of-the-Month Club, which later sold the Club to Reader's Digest, with Simon as part of the package. He stayed at Reader's Digest for 22 years, producing dozens of best-selling albums, such as The Great Band Era and Country Roads. He also conceived and was the editor of 17 Reader's Digest song books, including Treasury of Great Show Tunes and The Children's Songbook, which have sold in the millions and are still in print.

Simon's articles appear in several jazz anthologies, including The Jazz Word (Ballantine Books 1960) and The Jazz Makers (Rinehart & Co. 1957). For Record World's 1974 tribute to Sam Goody, Simon wrote the featured piece, "Sam Goody – The Early Years," on the occasion of Goody's 70th birthday and 35 years in the record business. (Simon worked for Goody for 5 years as salesman and record producer.)

Simon was also a sheet music collector and a founder and past president of the New York Sheet Music Society. The William L. Simon Sheet Music Collection is a part of Indiana University Southeast's special collections . He also served on the board of directors of the National Academy of Popular Music (Songwriters Hall of Fame), and was a member of ASCAP. As a saxophonist, Simon and partner George T. Simon started the Simon Swing Group which featured such guest artists as John Bunch, Dick Hyman, Tony Scott, Ram Ramirez, Eddie Daniels, Russell George, Ed Polcer, Warren Vache, Dan Fox and many others. They began the New York tradition of Twilight Jazz, playing at Eddie Condon's club during its final four years and then at Red Blazer Too and Jimmy Walker's. When he retired to Florida, Simon played at the Jazz Club of Sarasota's jam sessions.

Remembering Time, a CD of Simon on saxophone as well as his musical compositions performed by others was produced posthumously by Gunnar Jacobsen and Jack Brokensha. Simon worked with lyricists Jack Yellen, Charles Tobias, Gene Lees and Chuck Darwin. Jack Yellen referred to the song "Remembering Time" as "my favorite non-hit" (Jack Yellen lyrics, Simon music). His musical compositions were performed by Carmen McRae, Teddi King, Tony Scott, Art Farmer, John Coltrane, B. Bopstein (pseudonym for Dizzy Gillespie), Don Byas, Oscar Pettiford, Jimmy Jones, Gene Ramey, Trummy Young and Ben Webster among others.

Carmen McRae singing "Along About This Time Last Year"

Bill Simon playing "Moon Over Yesterday" on Piano

Demo recording of "At Home With the Blues"

== Quote ==
On meeting Tony Scott in NYC:

...one night I was at the Onyx Club and this soldier walked in with his clarinet. I flipped when I heard him and we struck up a conversation… I was promoting with my friend Sir Charles Thompson a jazz concert/dance at the old Renaissance Ballroom in Harlem. He jumped at the chance to do the gig…on the first Saturday the great Freddie Webster sat in on trumpet, and Sandy Williams on Trombone. The posters listed Tony Sciacca on clarinet. From then on, Tony spent his ‘intown’ nights at my place and when he got out of the army, we got an apartment big enough and cheap enough for two struggling cats. We roomed together for five years. The phone calls came in all hours of the day and night sometimes for Tony ‘Scothca’, sometimes for ’Skeeacka’. Finally I suggested he make it easier on everyone and call himself Tony Scott.

— Bill Simon, IAJRC Journal
