= The Great Band Era =

Compilation album by Various Artists
- Released: 1965
- Recorded: 1936–1945
- Genre: Swing
- Label: Reader's Digest/RCA Victor

The Great Band Era is a compilation album featuring Swing music from 1936-1945. Reader's Digest released the album in 1965. In 1988, the Recording Industry Association of America certified 9 million sales of the album – making it one of the top selling albums ever within the United States. The album was released as a ten LP album box set. The album included many swing favorites, as well as new recordings.

== Promotion ==
Reader's Digest sent out a free promotional record before releasing the album. Voiced by Vaughn Monroe, the record boasted that in The Great Band Era, RCA Victor sound engineers had "remove[d] all the irritating noise and scratchiness that was always present on the original records, even when they were brand new."

== Music ==
The records contains mostly swing standards by major swing bands. It included an entire LP of "theme songs", or songs particularly associated or played exceptionally often by a band. Besides previous swing recordings, the album also contained some song versions released for the first time, including a version of Blues in the Night by Tommy Dorsey and Jo Stafford.

== Restored audio ==
This was one of the first LP releases to introduce the concept of audio restoration to the general public. although that term was not yet in general use. As mentioned above, a free promotional paper record was sent to Reader's Digest subscribers introducing the set, with Vaughn Monroe presenting "Before" and "After" versions of one of the songs to demonstrate what had been done to enhance the sound. As described in the booklet accompanying the records, each song was transferred from a new matrix, then electronically treated to remove surface noise as well as "ticks" and "pops." Although there is still some residual surface noise on a few of the tracks, the restoration overall was remarkably successful.

== Sales ==
According to the RIAA, The Great Band Era sold over 9 million copies in the United States, making it one of the best selling-albums of all time within the country. In addition, the Australian Recording Industry Association certified the album as gold in 1999.

== Track listing ==
From Discogs.

Side 1
| No. | Title | Writer(s) | Artist | Length |
|---|---|---|---|---|
| 1. | "I'm Getting Sentimental Over You" | Ned Washington; George Bassman | Tommy Dorsey and His Orchestra |
| 2. | "Take the "A" Train" | Billy Strayhorn | Duke Ellington and His Orchestra |
| 3. | "Blossoms" | Al Avola | Tony Pastor and His Orchestra |
| 4. | "Moonlight Serenade" | Glenn Miller; Mitchell Parish | Glenn Miller Orchestra |
| 5. | "Stardreams" | Charlie Spivak; Sonny Burke; Sylvia Dee | Charlie Spivak and His Orchestra |
| 6. | "Nighty Night" | Joe Davis | Alvino Rey and His Orchestra |

Side 2
| No. | Title | Writer(s) | Artist | Length |
|---|---|---|---|---|
| 1. | "Nightmare" | Artie Shaw | Artie Shaw and His Orchestra |
| 2. | "Kaye's Melody" | Sammy Kaye | Sammy Kaye |
| 3. | "Goodbye" | Gordon Jenkins | Benny Goodman and His Orchestra |
| 4. | "Make Believe Ballroom" | Andy Razaf; Paul Denniker | Charlie Barnet and His Glen Island Casino Orchestra |
| 5. | "Flying Home" | Lionel Hampton; Eddie DeLange; Benny Goodman | Lionel Hampton and His Orchestra |
| 6. | "Snowfall" | Claude Thornhill | Claude Thornhill and His Orchestra |

Side 3
| No. | Title | Writer(s) | Artist | Length |
|---|---|---|---|---|
| 1. | "Christopher Columbus" | Leon "Chu" Berry; Andy Razaf | Benny Goodman and His Orchestra |
| 2. | "The Music Goes Round and Round" | Edward Farley; Mike Riley; Red Hodgson | Tommy Dorsey and His Clambake Seven |
| 3. | "When Did You Leave Heaven?" | Richard A. Whiting; Walter Bullock | Guy Lombardo and His Royal Canadians |
| 4. | "All My Life" | Sam H. Stept; Sidney Mitchell | Fats Waller and Hish Rhythm |
| 5. | "Moon Over Miami" | Edgar Leslie; Joseph A. Burke | Eddy Duchin and His Orchestra |
| 6. | "These Foolish Things Remind Me of You" | Harry Link; Holt Marvell; Jack Strachey | Benny Goodman and His Orchestra |

Side 4
| No. | Title | Writer(s) | Artist | Length |
|---|---|---|---|---|
| 1. | "On the Atchison, Topeka and Santa Fe" | Harry Warren; Johnny Mercer | Tommy Dorsey and His Orchestra |
| 2. | "There I've Said It Again" | Bill Evans; Herbie Mann | Vaughn Monroe and His Orchestra |
| 3. | "Ac-Cent-Tchu-Ate the Positive" | Harold Arlen; Johnny Mercer | Artie Shaw and His Orchestra |
| 4. | "Symphony" | Alex Alstone; Jack Lawrence | Freddy Martin and His Orchestra |
| 5. | "It's Been a Long, Long Time" | Jule Styne; Sammy Cahn | Charlie Spivak and His Orchestra |
| 6. | "Sentimental Journey" | Ben Homer; Bud Green; Les Brown | Hal McIntyre and His Orchestra |

Side 5
| No. | Title | Writer(s) | Artist | Length |
|---|---|---|---|---|
| 1. | "Bob White" | Bernie Hanighen; Johnny Mercer | Benny Goodman and His Orchestra |
| 2. | "A Sailboat in the Moonlight" | Carmen Lombardo; John Jacob Loeb | Guy Lombardo and His Royal Canadians |
| 3. | "A Study in Brown" | Larry Clinton | Benny Goodman and His Orchestra |
| 4. | "Moonlight and Shadows" | Friedrich Hollaender; Leo Robin | Eddy Duchin and His Orchestra |
| 5. | "Once in a While" | Bud Green; Michael Edwards | Tommy Dorsey and His Orchestra |
| 6. | "Goodnight My Love" | Harry Revel; Mack Gordon | Shep Fields and His Rippling Rhythm Orchestra |

Side 6
| No. | Title | Writer(s) | Artist | Length |
|---|---|---|---|---|
| 1. | "Blue Rain" | Jimmy Van Heusen; Johhny Mercer | Glenn Miller and His Orchestra |
| 2. | "It Had to Be You" | Gus Kahn; Isham Jones | Earl Hines and His Orchestra |
| 3. | "I'm Making Believe" | James V. Monaco; Mack Gordon | Hal McIntyre and His Orchestra |
| 4. | "Mairzy Doats (and Dozy Doats)" | Al Hoffman; Jerry Livingston; Milton Drake | The Four King Sisters with Male Chorus |
| 5. | "You Always Hurt the One You Love" | Allan Roberts; Doris Fisher | Sammy Kaye and His Orchestra |
| 6. | "Poinciana" | Nat Simon; Buddy Bernier | David Rose and His Orchestra |

Side 7
| No. | Title | Writer(s) | Artist | Length |
|---|---|---|---|---|
| 1. | "Dipsy Doodle" | Larry Clinton | Tommy Dorsey and His Orchestra |
| 2. | "The Moon Got in My Eyes" | Arthur Johnston; Joseph A. Burke | Hal Kemp and His Orchestra |
| 3. | "So Rare" | Jerry Herst; John Rufus Sharpe | Guy Lombardo and His Royal Canadians |
| 4. | "Afraid to Dream" | Harry Revel; Mack Gordon | Benny Goodman and His Orchestra |
| 5. | "Vieni, Vieni" | Rudy Vallée and the Gentlemen Songsters | Rudy Vallée and His Connecticut Yankees |
| 6. | "That Old Feeling" | Lew Brown; Sammy Fain | Guy Lombardo and His Royal Canadians |

Side 8
| No. | Title | Writer(s) | Artist | Length |
|---|---|---|---|---|
| 1. | "I'll Be Seeing You" | Irving Kahal; Sammy Fain | Tommy Dorsey and His Orchestra |
| 2. | "There Goes That Song Again" | Jule Styne; Sammy Cahn | Sammy Kaye and His Orchestra |
| 3. | "Dance with a Dolly" | Jimmy Eaton; Mickey Leader; Terry Shand | Tony Pastor and His Orchestra |
| 4. | "I Dream of You (More Than You Dream I Do)" | Edna Osser; Marjorie Goetschius | Tommy Dorsey and His Orchestra |
| 5. | "Rum and Coca-Cola" | Jeri Sullavan; Morey Amsterdam; Paul Baron | Vaughn Monroe and His Orchestra |
| 6. | "San Fernando Valley" | Gordon Jenkins | The Four King Sisters |

Side 9
| No. | Title | Writer(s) | Artist | Length |
|---|---|---|---|---|
| 1. | "Music, Maestro, Please" | Allie Wrubel; Herbert Magidson | Tommy Dorsey and His Orchestra |
| 2. | "Bei mir bist Du schön" | Jacob Jacobs; Sammy Cahn; Saul Chaplin; Sholom Secunda | Guy Lombardo and His Royal Canadians |
| 3. | "I Let a Song Go Out of My Heart" | Duke Ellington; Henry Nemo; Irving Mills; John Redmond | Benny Goodman and His Orchestra |
| 4. | "I Have Eyes" | Leo Robin; Ralph Rainger | Artie Shaw and His Orchestra |
| 5. | "Heart and Soul" | Frank Loesser; Hoagy Carmichael | Larry Clinton and His Orchestra |
| 6. | "I've Got a Pocket Full of Dreams" | James V. Monaco; Johnny Burke | Hal Kemp and His Orchestra |

Side 10
| No. | Title | Writer(s) | Artist | Length |
|---|---|---|---|---|
| 1. | "For Me and My Gal" | E. Ray Goetz; Edgar Leslie; George W. Meyer | Abe Lyman and His Californians |
| 2. | "Manhattan Serenade" | Harold Adamson; Louis Alter | Tommy Dorsey and His Orchestra |
| 3. | "All or Nothing at All" | Arthur Altman; Jack Lawrence | Freddy Martin and His Orchestra |
| 4. | "A Pink Cocktail for a Blue Lady" | Ben Oakland; Herbert Magidson | Glenn Miller |
| 5. | "Brazil" | Ary Barroso | Enric Madriguera and His Orchestra |
| 6. | "It's Always You" | Jimmy Van Heusen; Johnny Burke | Glenn Miller and His Orchestra |

Side 11
| No. | Title | Writer(s) | Artist | Length |
|---|---|---|---|---|
| 1. | "The Flat Foot Floogee" | Bud Green; Slam Stewart; Slim Gaillard | Benny Goodman and His Orchestra |
| 2. | "I Double Dare You" | Jimmy Eaton; Terry Shand | Larry Clinton and His Orchestra |
| 3. | "You Go to My Head" | Haven Gillespie; John Frederick Coots | Jan Savitt and His Top Hatters |
| 4. | "Says My Heart" | Burton Lane; Frank Loesser; Harriet Hillard | Ozzie Nelson and His Orchestra |
| 5. | "My Reverie" | Larry Clinton | Larry Clinton and His Orchestra |
| 6. | "You Must Have Been a Beautiful Baby" | Harry Warren; Johnny Mercer | Tommy Dorsey and His Clambake Seven |

Side 12
| No. | Title | Writer(s) | Artist | Length |
|---|---|---|---|---|
| 1. | "Taking a Chance on Love" | John La Touche; Ted Fetter; Vernon Duke | Sammy Kaye and His Orchestra |
| 2. | "Moonlight Mood" | Harold Adamson; Peter DeRose | Glenn Miller and His Orchestra |
| 3. | "Dearly Beloved" | Jerome Kern; Johnny Mercer | Alvino Rey and His Orchestra |
| 4. | "Let's Get Lost" | Frank Loesser; Jimmy McHugh | Teddy Powell and His Orchestra |
| 5. | "That Old Black Magic" | Harold Arlen; Johnny Mercer | Glenn Miller and His Orchestra |
| 6. | "Warsaw Concerto" | Richard Addinsell | Freddy Martin and His Orchestra |

Side 13
| No. | Title | Writer(s) | Artist | Length |
|---|---|---|---|---|
| 1. | "Blue Orchids" | Hoagy Carmichael | Tommy Dorsey and His Orchestra |
| 2. | "Don't Worry 'bout Me" | Rube Bloom; Ted Koehler | Les Brown and His Orchestra |
| 3. | "Our Love" | Bob Emmerich; Buddy Bernier; Larry Clinton | Tommy Dorsey and His Orchestra |
| 4. | "Scatter-Brain" | Frankie Masters; Johnny Burke; Keene-Bean | Freddy Martin and His Orchestra |
| 5. | "Wishing" | Buddy DeSylva | Skinnay Ennis and His Orchestra |
| 6. | "Sunrise Serenade" | Frankie Carle; Jack Lawrence | Hal Kemp and His Orchestra |

Side 14
| No. | Title | Writer(s) | Artist | Length |
|---|---|---|---|---|
| 1. | "Serenade in Blue" | Harry Warren; Mack Gordon | Glenn Miller and His Orchestra |
| 2. | "Jingle, Jangle, Jingle" | Frank Loesser; Joseph J. Liley | Freddy Martin and His Orchestra |
| 3. | "Blues in the Night" | Harold Arlen; Johnny Mercer | Tommy Dorsey and His Orchestra |
| 4. | "When the Lights Go on Again" | Bennie Benjamin; Eddie Seiler; Sol Marcus | Vaughn Monroe and His Orchestra |
| 5. | "Strip Polka" | Johnny Mercer | Alvino Rey and His Orchestra |
| 6. | "Tangerine" | Johnny Mercer; Victor Schertzinger | Vaughn Monroe and His Orchestra |

Side 15
| No. | Title | Writer(s) | Artist | Length |
|---|---|---|---|---|
| 1. | "Do I Love You?" | Cole Porter | Artie Shaw and His Orchestra |
| 2. | "And the Angels Sing" | Johnny Mercer; Ziggy Elman | Ziggy Elman and His Orchestra |
| 3. | "I Cried for You" | Abe Lyman; Arthur Freed; Gus Arnheim | Bunny Berigan and His Orchestra |
| 4. | "Heaven Can Wait" | Eddie DeLange; Jimmy Van Heusen | Tommy Dorsey and His Orchestra |
| 5. | "The Lamp Is Low" | Bert Shefter; Maurice Ravel; Mitchell Parish; Peter DeRose | Glenn Miller and His Orchestra |
| 6. | "The Umbrella Man" | Larry Stock; Vincent Rose; James Cavanaugh | Sammy Kaye and His Orchestra |

Side 16
| No. | Title | Writer(s) | Artist | Length |
|---|---|---|---|---|
| 1. | "I Don't Want to Walk Without You" | Frank Loesser; Jule Styne | Artie Shaw and His Orchestra |
| 2. | "Sleepy Lagoon" | Eric Coates; Jack Lawrence | Tommy Dorsey and His Orchestra |
| 3. | "Deep in the Heart of Texas" | Don Swander; June Hershey | Alvino Rey and His Orchestra |
| 4. | " Skylark" | Hoagy Carmichael; Johnny Mercer | Earl Hines and His Orchestra |
| 5. | "Rose O'Day" | Al Lewis; Charles Tobias | Freddy Martin and His Orchestra |
| 6. | "Moonlight Cocktail" | Kim Gannon; Luckey Roberts | Glenn Miller and His Orchestra |

Side 17
| No. | Title | Writer(s) | Artist | Length |
|---|---|---|---|---|
| 1. | "Blueberry Hill" | Al Lewis; Larry Stock; Vincent Rose | Glenn Miller and His Orchestra |
| 2. | "All This and Heaven Too" | Eddie Delange; Jimmy Van Heusen | Charlie Barnet and His Orchestra |
| 3. | "We Three (My Echo, My Shadow and Me)" | Dick Robertson; Nelson Cogane; Sammy Mysels | Bob Chester and His Orchestra |
| 4. | "Ferryboat Serenade" | Eldo Di Lazzaro; Harold Adamson; Mario Panzeri | Gray Gordon and His Tic-Toc Rhythm |
| 5. | "Fools Rush In (Where Angels Fear to Tread)" | Johnny Mercer; Rube Bloom | Tommy Dorsey and His Orchestra |
| 6. | "There I Go" | Hy Zaret; Irving Weiser | Vaughn Monroe and His Orchestra |

Side 18
| No. | Title | Writer(s) | Artist | Length |
|---|---|---|---|---|
| 1. | "I Hear a Rhapsody" | Dick Gasparre; George Fragos; Jack Baker | Charlie Barnet and His Orchestra |
| 2. | "Daddy" | Bobby Troup | Sammy Kaye and His Orchestra |
| 3. | "Chattanooga Choo Choo" | Harry Warren; Mack Gordon | Glenn Miller and His Orchestra |
| 4. | "The Hut-Sut Song" | Jack Owens; Leo V. Killion; Ted McMichael | Freddy Martin and His Orchestra |
| 5. | "I Guess I'll Have to Dream the Rest" | Bud Green; Martin Block; Mickey Stoner | Glenn Miller and His Orchestra |
| 6. | "It All Comes Back to Me Now" | Alex Kramer; Hy Zaret; Joan Whitney Kramer | Hal Kemp and His Orchestra |

Side 19
| No. | Title | Writer(s) | Artist | Length |
|---|---|---|---|---|
| 1. | "Frenesi" | Alberto Dominguez; Bob Russell; Ray Charles | Artie Shaw and His Orchestra |
| 2. | "The Nearness of You" | Hoagy Carmichael; Ned Washington | Larry Clinton and His Orchestra |
| 3. | "The Woodpecker Song" | Bruno Cherubini; Eldo DiLazzaro; Harold Adamson | Glenn Miller and His Orchestra |
| 4. | "Imagination" | Jimmy Van Heusen; Johnny Burke | Tommy Dorsey and His Orchestra |
| 5. | "With the Wind and the Rain in Your Hair" | Clara Edwards; Jack Lawrence | Bob Chester and His Orchestra |
| 6. | "Sierra Sue" | Joseph B. Carey | Glenn Miller and His Orchestra |

Side 20
| No. | Title | Writer(s) | Artist | Length |
|---|---|---|---|---|
| 1. | "Perfidia" | Alberto Dominguez; Milton Leeds | Glenn Miller and His Orchestra |
| 2. | "Dolores" | Frank Loesser; Louis Alter | Tommy Dorsey and His Orchestra |
| 3. | "This Time the Dream's on Me" | Harold Arlen; Johnny Mercer | Artie Shaw and His Orchestra |
| 4. | "The Things I Love" | Harold Barlow; Lew Harris | Jan Savitt and His Top Hatters |
| 5. | "You and I" | Meredith Willson | Tommy Dorsey and His Orchestra |
| 6. | "Yours (Quiéreme Mucho)" | Gonzalo Roig; Jack Sherr | Xavier Cugat and His Orchestra |
