= Noise reduction (disambiguation) =

Noise reduction may refer to:

- Audio noise reduction
- Image noise reduction
- Soundproofing
- Record restoration

== See also ==
- Noise (disambiguation)
