= Impulse 21 =

Sailboat class

- I21

Development
- Designer: William E. Cook
- Location: United States
- Year: 1986
- No. built: 150
- Builders: Impulse Marine; Johnson Boatworks
- Role: Day sailer-One-design racer
- Name: Impulse 21

Boat
- Displacement: 1,300 lb (590 kg)
- Draft: 3.25 ft (0.99 m)

Hull
- Type: monohull
- Construction: fiberglass
- LOA: 21.00 ft (6.40 m)
- LWL: 18.50 ft (5.64 m)
- Beam: 8.00 ft (2.44 m)

Hull appendages
- Keel: fin keel
- Ballast: 600 lb (272 kg)
- Rudder: internally-mounted spade-type rudder

Rig
- Rig type: Bermuda rig
- I foretriangle height: 23.10 ft (7.04 m)
- J foretriangle base: 7.00 ft (2.13 m)
- P mainsail luff: 26.00 ft (7.92 m)
- E mainsail foot: 9.70 ft (2.96 m)

Sails
- Sailplan: fractional rigged sloop
- Mainsail area: 126.10 sq ft (11.715 m^{2})
- Jib/genoa area: 80.85 sq ft (7.511 m^{2})
- Spinnaker area: 340 sq ft (32 m^{2})
- Total sail area: 206.95 sq ft (19.226 m^{2})

Racing
- D-PN: 84.2
- PHRF: 183

The Impulse 21, built by Impulse Marine Inc is an American trailerable sailboat that was designed by William E. Cook as a one-design racer and day sailer, It was first built in 1986.

== Production ==
The design was initially built by Impulse Marine in the United States. After the first 10-12 boats were completed, it was then built under contract by Johnson Boatworks on behalf of Impulse Marine. A total of 150 boats were completed, but it is now out of production.

== Design ==
The Impulse 21 is a recreational keelboat, built predominantly of fiberglass, with a Klegecell core. It has a fractional sloop rig, a raked stem, a cut-out, walk-through, sharply reverse transom that allows ease of boarding, an internally mounted spade-type rudder controlled by a tiller and a fixed fin keel. It displaces 1,300 lb (590 kg) and carries 600 lb (272 kg) of ballast.

The boat has a draft of 3.25 ft (0.99 m) with the standard keel.

The design has only a small cuddy cabin for sail and cooler stowage and no sleeping accommodation.

For sailing the design is equipped with a cockpit that is 9 ft (2.7 m) long. It has a launcher tube for a spinnaker of 340 sq ft (32 m^{2}) and a self-tacking jib. The boat is equipped with foam-fill compartments for buoyancy.

The design has a Portsmouth Yardstick D-PN 84.2

PHRF racing average handicap of 183 .

== Operational history ==
In a 1994 review Richard Sherwood wrote, "a day sailer with room for lots of crew, the Impulse's most unusual feature is a center console housing the control lines for the jib sheet, jib traveler, jib Cunningham, main Cunningham, boom vang, spinnaker halyard, spinnaker retriever, and backstay adjustments. The cockpit is 9 feet long, with seating on the wide decks ... Keel depth is moderate, so that Impulse may be trailered. However, the keel, taken with the wide beam and deck, provides good stability, and foam-filled compartments provide flotation."

== See also ==
- List of sailing boat types
- Impulse (dinghy), another sailboat design with the same name.
