= Impulse (retailer) =

British entertainment retail chain

Impulse Music Travel
- Type: Private
- Industry: Entertainment Retail
- Founded: March 1994
- Headquarters: Hertfordshire, United Kingdom
- Number of locations: 24
- Key people: Les Whitfield, Managing Director (1994-2007)
- Products: CDs; DVDs; Games; Music
- Revenue: £9 million (2007)
- Number of employees: 150
- Parent: Impulse Music Travel Limited

Impulse Music Travel was an entertainment retail chain in the United Kingdom, with 24 concessions in various UK airports and railway stations. The company was formed in March 1994. In July 2007, Managing Director Les Whitfield sold the company.

== History ==
The company was formed in March 1994 and entered into administration on 21 March 2001 with BDO Stoy Hayward. Ray Stocking, joint administrator of Impulse Music Travel, said the rapid expansion of the chain was one of the reasons why it had forced the company into administration. The company was brought out of administration and sold in July 2007. There were 24 Impulse locations across the United Kingdom prior to their closure.

== Operations ==
In the 1990s, the company operated the Selfridges, in London, and Fenwicks, in Newcastle, computer departments. Other store locations previously included Burnley, Darlington, Hartlepool and Macclesfield, and King's Cross and Marylebone railway stations.

Impulse operated concessions at Birmingham Airport, London Luton Airport, Manchester Airport formed through contracts with BAA.

== Product range ==
Impulse Music Travel concessions mainly stocked CDs, DVDs and Video Games.

== See also ==
- Head Entertainment
