= Record restoration =

Digitization of gramophone records

Record restoration, a particular kind of audio restoration, is the process of converting the analog signal stored on gramophone records (either 78 rpm shellac, or 45 and 33 1/3 rpm vinyl) into digital audio files that can then be edited with computer software and digitally stored. The process may be divided into several separate steps performed in the following order:

1. Cleaning the record, to prevent unwanted audio artifacts from being introduced in the capture that will necessitate correction in the digital domain (e.g. transient surface noise caused by dirt), and to prevent unnecessary wear and damage to the stylus used in playback.
2. Transcription of the record to another format on another medium (generally a digital format such as a wav file on a computer);
3. Processing the raw sound file with software in order to remove transient noise resulting from surface damage, clicks, pops, and crackle caused by surface scratches and wear;
4. Using software to adjust the volume and equalization;
5. Processing the audio with digital and analogue techniques to reduce surface/wideband noise;
6. Saving the file in the desired format (WAV, MP3, FLAC, etc.).

The source of the information for these steps is available from various websites and the help files for the software employed in the process.

== Record cleaning ==
The first step involves cleaning the playing surface of the records (unless they have been stored in archival, dust-free conditions since they were last cleaned). This can involve anything from turntable-based, vacuum-equipped, professional cleaning machines that use proprietary chemical formulations and cost four figures, to improvised methods involving home-made equipment and/or cleaning solutions consisting of isopropyl alcohol, distilled water (unpurified tap water should not be used, as it will probably leave limescale deposits on the record surface) and a surfactant to aid drying. Isopropyl alcohol should only be used to clean vinyl records: it will cause permanent damage to shellac, master and one-time recordings (acetate, wax and lacquer).

== Hardware ==
The second step involves transcription of a record using a suitable turntable and a suitable cartridge-stylus combination. More often than not, a magnetic cartridge and stylus combination is used because of its superior sound characteristics and signal-to-noise ratio over other pickup systems. The output of a magnetic cartridge is of a very low volume (typically ≈5mV) so the signal must be amplified with a preamplifier to bring it up to line level before being routed into the line-in jack of a computer's sound card. Sound cards made specifically for digitally recording vinyl (as well as those designed for DJing with timecode vinyl) have phono preamplifiers built in, eliminating the need for two separate devices.

Three main types of phono-preamplifier exist for the process of record restoration and playback:

- those that apply RIAA equalization or RIAA de-emphasis on playback to counteract the equalization used when the recording was originally made. These are generally not suitable for 78rpm records and early microgroove recordings.
- those that include a switchable frequency turnover filter to match the various turnover frequencies used by the many record manufacturers between 1925 and c.1960.
- those that apply no equalization (also called "Flat" phonopreamplifiers). These require audio software to apply the correct equalization to the digital recording during the restoration process. As such, this type of preamplifier is suitable for all record formats regardless of equalization employed by the mastering process.

Regardless of the preamplifier employed, one must ensure that the output volume is not set too high when recording through the sound card, or digital clipping may result. A low average volume can easily be corrected later on during editing (although with some loss in dynamic range) - however, too low a volume setting can result in greater amount of noise (especially the inherent sound-card or system noise) relative to the usable audio and this noise will become prominent at the time of normalisation of the audio. Ideally, the VU meter should not exceed around -2 or -3 dB to allow for some signal headroom. However, some clipping due to transient responses caused by scratches or cracked records are usually acceptable since these are extremely small in width and do not usually cause any audible difference. One must also be sure that all equipment is grounded appropriately together, or subtle hums will likely result from the formation of ground loops. Similarly, the computer should have sufficient power and memory to record an entire record without any "drop-outs"— (tiny gaps in the audio stream lasting just a fraction of a second).

== Software ==
The software used to process the resulting digital files ranges in price from thousands of dollars to freeware. Some of these applications are simple, and some are very complex. Many are general purpose waveform editors that also happen to include record restoration features or plugins, and others are dedicated to the sole purpose of record restoration. Moreover, some applications are designed for easy fast processing with the push of a few buttons, and others require a time-consuming but perhaps more exact manual approach to editing out damage. Most applications present a waveform display, but a few are basically noise and click-pop filters that provide no visual display at all. All record restoration applications for Windows work directly upon WAV files, but a few will also directly open files in other formats, such as MP3. Most commonly this type of audio processing is now done via a DAW.

Record restoration software normally handles two different categories of noise separately. First, there is the constant background noise that goes on through the entire recording that is the result of the sound the stylus makes in the groove when no music is playing, plus whatever subtle drones are generated by the electronics involved (such as turntable rumble or 50/60 cycle hum). In addition to band-stop filters (also known as "notch filters"), low-pass filters, and high-pass filters for filtering out hum and noise, many applications allow the user to take a "noiseprint" of a small section of waveform when the stylus is tracking but no music is playing; the filtering is then accomplished specific to this noiseprint. Second, there are the transient bursts of damage, mostly clicks and pops, caused by scratches or record defects, and crackle caused by many minute defects grouped close together. The software must filter this kind of click-pop damage conservatively, because a click or a pop can look very much like a legitimate percussive effect, such as a light snare drum rim-shot. If the automatic filtering software is getting every last click, chances are good that it could also be filtering some percussion instruments. After an automatic click filtering, it is reasonable to expect a few clicks to be left over, and these must be removed manually by isolating them one-by-one in the waveform. These residual clicks may then be corrected by attenuation (reducing or muting the volume of the anomaly), interpolation (replacing the waveform "spike" with a less offensive section, either a straight line—linear interpolation—or a calculated facsimile deduced from what the wave looks like on either side); substitution (replacing a damaged waveform segment with a similar section from elsewhere); channel substitution (where damage occurring in only one channel of a stereo waveform is replaced by a similar good segment in the other channel); and simple deletion, which is usually not noticeable for small samples. Some applications also have a "pencil tool" with which one can actually redraw the waveform.

== Volume and equalization ==
After the noise and clicks and pops have been removed, one may adjust the volume. This is usually done by a process called audio normalization whereby the loudest tone in a track is amplified right up to some specified point, usually the point of digital clipping, and the rest of the waveform is amplified accordingly. In another form of amplification called "hard limiting," the loudest passages are attenuated drastically after they hit a certain limit, while the quieter passages are amplified. The result is a compressed waveform that sounds considerably louder, though it may not be what the original recording engineers intended. In all of these volume adjustments, one should respect the original dynamics of a piece, and of the variation in dynamics among different tracks in the same LP.

In addition to adjusting the volume, at this point one may desire to adjust the frequency profile of a piece with the "graphic equalizer" that is normally supplied with a wave editor. Some might feel that a track needs a slight treble boost, or reduction, or a big boost in the bass department. One should satisfy one's own perception of what sounds best for any particular track. An application usually lets you "preview" a piece before applying the equalization effects.

== Export and save ==
After all this is done, the file (or files) are ready to export (or save) in whatever form the user desires. Almost all wave editing applications have the default ability to save files in WAV form, and some can also save files as MP3, FLAC, or in other formats. Many CD-R burning applications can then take these files and burn them onto a blank recordable disc in a form that can be played on a common CD player (using the standard CD-DA format).

== Preservation ==
Each medium - including digital media - has benefits and drawbacks and over the long term, vinyl records may even have advantages over digital media. Due to the nature of the medium, playback of "hard" records, e.g.: LPs, causes gradual degradation of the recording. CDs, however, can also have degradation due to "CD rot" and other abnormalities. CDs' shelf life has been disputed as to whether it is to be the equivalent of vinyl- which actually can last for years of playback. CDs also can have shortcomings such as skips and clicks. This is due to problems with the laser reading the discs. On the other hand, a vinyl record will play under most any circumstance because it is an analog medium. The recordings are best preserved by transferring them onto more stable media and playing the records as rarely as possible. They need to be stored on edge, and do best under environmental conditions that most humans would find comfortable. The medium needs to be kept clean — but alcohol should only be used on PVC or optical media, not on 78s. The equipment for playback of certain formats (e.g. 16 and 78 rpm) is manufactured only in small quantities, leading to increased difficulty in finding equipment to play the recordings. (This "gradual degradation" is more noticeable on some discs than others. In fact it is possible to have eighty-year-old records that sound as new as brand new discs with pops and tics. How the records are handled and the equipment on which they are played as well as the manufacturing process and quality of original vinyl have a considerable impact upon their wear.) Where old disc recordings are considered to be of artistic or historic interest, record companies or archivists play back the disc on suitable equipment and record the result, typically onto a digital format which can be copied and converted without any further damage to the recording. For example, Nimbus Records uses a specially built horn record player to transfer 78s. However, anyone can do this using a standard record player with a suitable pickup, a phono-preamp (pre-amplifier) and a typical personal computer. Once a recording has been digitized, it can be manipulated with software to restore and, hopefully, improve the sound, for example by removing the result of scratches. It can also be easily converted to other digital formats such as DVD-A, CD and MP3.

As an alternative to playback with a stylus, a recording can be read optically, processed with software that calculates the velocity that the stylus would be moving in the mapped grooves and converted to a digital recording format. This does no further damage to the disc and generally produces a better sound than normal playback. This technique also has the potential to allow for reconstruction of damaged or broken disks.

With regard to inner sleeves, plastic polyethylene is purported to be better than the common paper sleeve and less bulky than the poly-lined paper variety. Paper sleeves deteriorate over time, leave dusty fibers, and produce static that attract dust. 100% poly sleeves produce less static (thereby attracting less dust), are archival, and are thinner by nature so they minimize pressure on the LP jacket seams.
