= Sonic artifact =

Audible defect generated during the recording or editing of a sound

In sound and music production, sonic artifact, or simply artifact, refers to sonic material that is accidental or unwanted, resulting from the editing or manipulation of a sound.

== Types ==
Because there are always technical restrictions in the way a sound can be recorded (in the case of acoustic sounds) or designed (in the case of synthesised or processed sounds), sonic errors often occur. These errors are termed artifacts (or sound/sonic artifacts), and may be pleasing or displeasing. A sonic artifact is sometimes a type of digital artifact, and in some cases is the result of data compression (not to be confused with dynamic range compression, which also may create sonic artifacts).

Often an artifact is deliberately produced for creative reasons, for example to introduce a change in timbre of the original sound or to create a sense of cultural or stylistic context. A well-known example is the overdriving of an electric guitar or electric bass signal to produce a clipped, distorted guitar tone or fuzz bass.

Editing processes that deliberately produce artifacts often involve technical experimentation. A good example of the deliberate creation of sonic artifacts is the addition of grainy pops and clicks to a recent recording in order to make it sound like a vintage vinyl record.

Flanging and distortion were originally regarded as sonic artifacts; as time passed they became a valued part of pop music production methods. Flanging is added to electric guitar and keyboard parts. Other magnetic tape artifacts include wow, flutter, saturation, hiss, noise, and print-through.

It is valid to consider the genuine surface noise such as pops and clicks that are audible when a vintage vinyl recording is played back or recorded onto another medium as sonic artifacts, although not all sonic artifacts must contain in their meaning or production a sense of "past", more so a sense of "by-product". Other vinyl record artifacts include turntable rumble, ticks, crackles and groove echos.

In the Nyquist–Shannon sampling theorem, inadequate sampling bandwidth creates a sonic artifact known as an alias, and the resulting distortion of the sound is termed aliasing. Examples of aliasing can be heard in early music samplers since they could record audio at bit rates and sampling frequencies below the Nyquist rate, considered desirable by some musicians. Aliasing is a major concern in the analog-to-digital conversion of video and audio signals.

In the creation of computer music and electronic music in the past decade, particularly in glitch music, software is used to create sonic artifacts of all stripes. They are also the primary focus of the practice of circuit bending: making sounds from products that were unintended by the makers of the circuitry.

== See also ==
- Data compression
- Digital artifact
- Dynamic range compression
- Glitch (music)
- Compression artifact
- Sampling (signal processing)
- Signal (information theory)
- Window function
- Circuit bending
- Sound reproduction
- Noise music
- Noise pumping
- Breathing (noise reduction)
- Codec listening test
