= Impulse noise =

Impulse noise could mean:

- Impulse noise (audio)
- Electromagnetic interference
- Burst noise
- Salt-and-pepper noise
