= Audio restoration =

Removal of imperfections from recorded sound

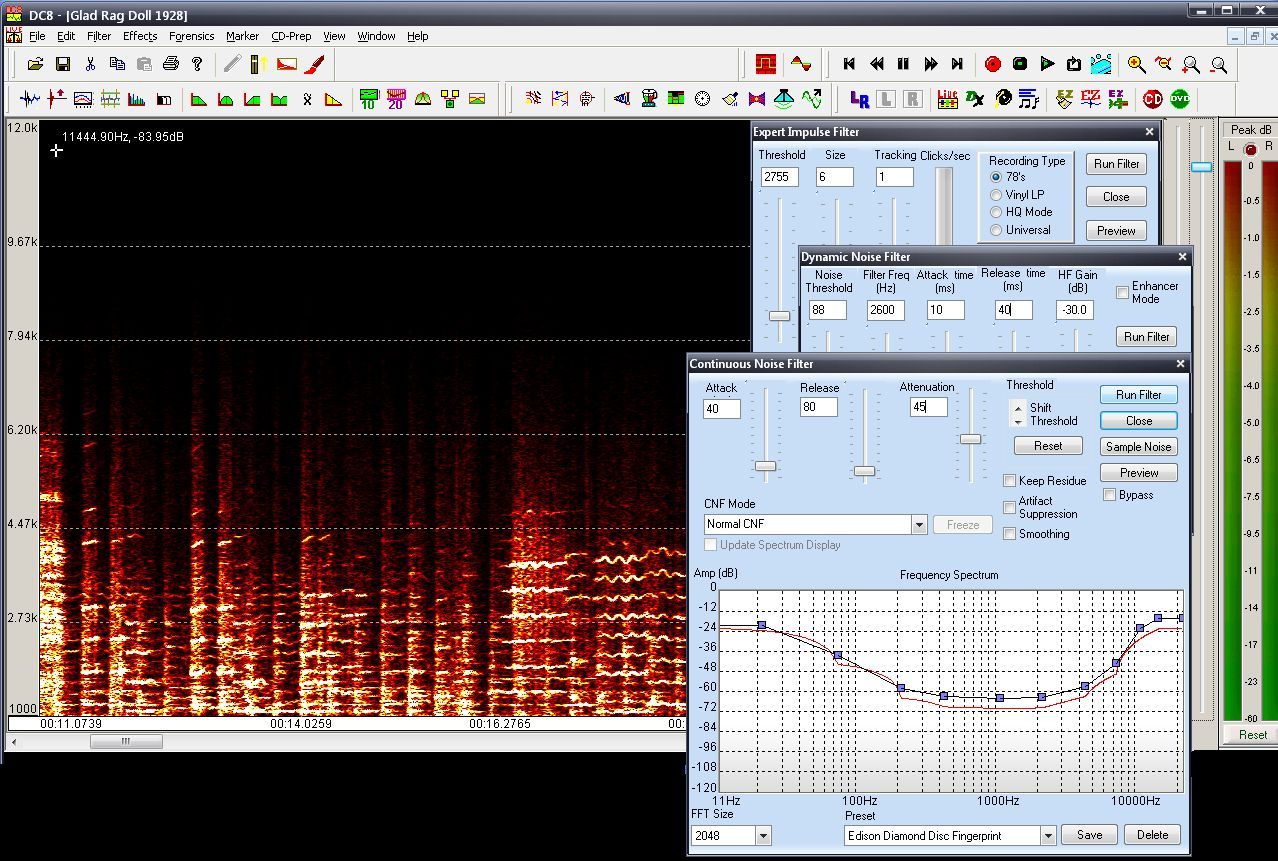
DC8 screenshot

Audio restoration is the process of removing imperfections (such as hiss, impulse noise, crackle, wow and flutter, background noise, mains hum, and lossy audio compression) from sound recordings. Audio restoration can be performed directly on the recording medium (for example, washing a gramophone record with a cleansing solution) or on a digital representation of the recording using a computer (such as an AIFF, WAV, or MP3 file). Record restoration is a particular form of audio restoration that seeks to repair the sound of damaged gramophone records.

Modern audio restoration techniques are usually performed by digitizing an audio source from analog media, such as lacquer recordings, optical sources, and magnetic tape. Once in the digital realm, recordings can be restored and cleaned up using dedicated, standalone digital processing units such as declickers, decracklers, dehissers and dialogue noise suppressors, or using digital audio workstations (DAWs). DAWs can perform various automated techniques to remove anomalies using algorithms to accomplish broadband denoising, declicking and decrackling, as well as removing buzzes and hums. Often audio engineers and sound editors use DAWs to manually remove "pops and ticks" from recordings, and the latest spectrographic 'retouching' techniques allow for the suppression or removal of discrete unwanted sounds. DAWs are capable of removing the smallest of anomalies, often without leaving artifacts and other evidence of their removal. Although fully automated solutions exist, audio restoration is sometimes a time-consuming process that requires skilled audio engineers with specific experience in music and film recording techniques.

== Overview ==
The majority of audio restoration done today is done for music sound recordings and soundtracks for motion picture and television programs. The demand for restored audio has been fueled by new media consumer technologies such as CD and DVD. Modern audio reproduction systems require that sound sources be in the best condition possible to enhance the listening experience. Media content owners have come to recognize the importance of having clean sound on their products to enhance the commercial value of their media assets.

The byproduct of these restoration efforts is that many audio sources are brought into the digital world and preserved for future use. An unfortunate fact is that most of the sound recordings and motion picture soundtracks created over the past century have been lost due to improper storage and neglect.

Enhancements are often done to motion picture soundtracks. For example, taking a mono or stereo soundtrack and re-mixing it to a modern 5.1 surround soundtrack. When sources from original discrete audio "stems" containing dialog, music and sound effects are used and properly restored, the enhancements can be significant and highly effective.

The annual Grammy Awards presents the award for Best Historical Album in recognition of restored recordings.

== Recent developments ==
Two researchers at Lawrence Berkeley National Laboratory, Vitaliy Fadeyev and Carl Haber have been experimenting with an audio restoration method that involves taking a very high definition digital photographic image of the vintage recording medium. They use a precision optical metrology system (designed to scan silicon detectors) to form an image of the groove on a 78 rpm record. After processing the digital file, they have an audio stream that represents the variations in the groove walls, allowing them to "play" the record virtually without using a phonograph stylus. 2D images can be made more quickly and have proved worthy of further investigation on 78 rpm discs cut laterally. A 3D method is possible, though it takes much longer for the photographic survey of the recording, and it requires much more storage space for the larger digital file. 3D methods are required for non-flat media such as "hill-and-dale" recordings (an early vertical cutting method by Pathé), Edison cylinders and Dictabelt rolls. 3D imaging is required for stereo phonograph records in order to capture the full detail of both inner and outer groove walls.

In the summer of 2007, the U.S. Library of Congress moved their audio, video and film restoration group to Culpeper, Virginia where the newly completed National Audio-Visual Conservation Center Packard Campus is sited. Gene DeAnna heads the Recorded Sound Section. With 3 million sound recordings and many more film and video works that include synchronized sound in the archive, the mission of the Sound Section is twofold: preserve the treasure of vintage sound recordings and increase public accessibility to the collection. One of the ways that access can be increased is through the diligent digitization of analog media. The Library has expressed interest in the Fadeyev/Haber 2D imaging method for quick digital archival of their vast collection of vinyl and shellac phonograph records. Audio restoration tasks will take place in parallel with the digitization effort. A massive, multi-petabyte storage array is nearing completion; it will hold the large digital audio and moving image files.

== Subjective issues ==
Audio restoration is a subjective process, and there are many strategies or perspectives that the audio engineer or sound editor can employ. The archival perspective says that audio restoration should restore the recording to its original condition, while the commercial perspective says that the recording should be both restored and enhanced to appeal most immediately with modern audiences.

== Notable audio restoration engineers ==
- Michael Graves
- Bob Ludwig
- Gavin Lurssen
- Ward Marston
- Peter J. Moore
- James P. Nichols
- Joseph M. Palmaccio
- Christian Zwarg

== See also ==
- Record restoration
- Audio inpainting
