= High-frequency impulse-measurement =

Measurement technique

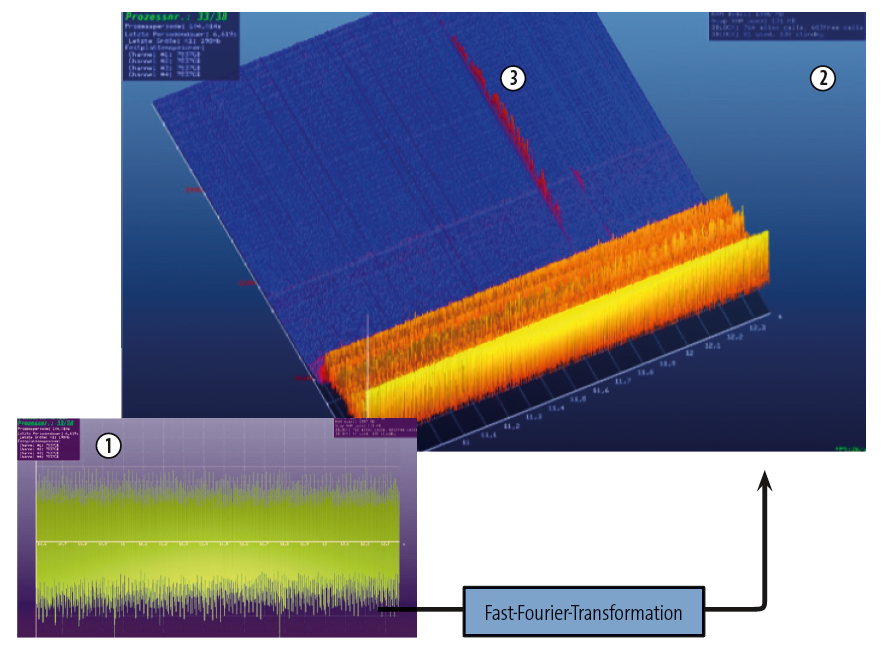
Structure-borne sound signal in the conventional 2-dimensional diagram "amplitude vs. time" (1) and the same signal as 3-dimensional HFIM process landscape (2). The enhanced signal-to-noise ratio becomes obvious while an impulse-like signal (3) becomes directly evident in the HFIM picture whereas it is not visible in the 2-dimensional diagram.

HFIM, acronym for high-frequency-impulse-measurement, is a type of measurement technique in acoustics, where structure-borne sound signals are detected and processed with certain emphasis on short-lived signals as they are indicative for crack formation in a solid body, mostly steel. The basic idea is to use mathematical signal processing methods such as Fourier analysis in combination with suitable computer hardware to allow for real-time measurements of acoustic signal amplitudes as well as their distribution in frequency space. The main benefit of this technique is the enhanced signal-to-noise ratio when it comes to the separation of acoustic emission from a certain source and other, unwanted contamination by any kinds of noise. The technique is therefore mostly applied in industrial production processes, e.g. cold forming or machining, where a 100 percent quality control is required or in condition monitoring for e.g. quantifying tool wear.

== Physical basics ==
High-frequency-impulse measurement is an algorithm for obtaining frequency information of any structure- or air-borne sound source on the basis of discrete signal transformations. This is mostly done using [Fourier series] to quantify the distribution of the energy content of a sound signal in frequency space. On the software side, the tool used for this is the fast Fourier transform (FFT) implementation of this mathematical transformation. This allows, in combination with specific hardware, to directly obtain frequency information so that this is accessible in-line, e.g. during a production process. Contrary to classical, off-line frequency analysis methods, the signal is not unfolded before transformation but is directly fed into the FFT computation. Single events, such as cracks, are hence depicted as extremely short-lived signals covering the entire frequency range (the Fourier transform of a single impulse is a signal covering the entire observed frequency space). Therefore, such single events are easily separable from other noises, even if they are much more energetic.

== Applications ==
Because of its in-line capabilities, HFIM is mostly applied in industrial production processes when it comes to high quality standards e.g. for auto parts that are relevant for crash behavior of a car:

- Cold forming: In cold forming applications, HFIM is mostly used to detect cracks during the forming process. Since such cracks are vastly due to stress in the manufactured part, the spontaneous formation of a crack is accompanied by a very sharp, impulse-like signal in the HFIM process landscape which can easily be separated from other noise. Therefore, HFIM is the standard technology for crack detection in the automotive sector all over the world.
- Machining: In many machining applications, HFIM is used to either monitor the status of tool wear and hence enable pedicitive maintenance or to prevent chatter.
- Plastic injection molding: Here, HFIM is used to monitor the status of the molds which are usually very complex. In particular, breaking off of small pins or other parts of the mold can be detected in-line.
- Welding: In contrast to most classical monitoring systems for the welding process which usually measure currents or voltages on the welding device, HFIM measures the energy acting directly on the welded workpiece. That allows for detection of various weld imperfections such as burn-through.

There are also several applications of HFIM devices in materials science laboratories where the exact timing of crack formation is relevant, for instance when determining the plasticity of a new kind of steel.

== External links and further reading ==
- Website of QASS, a German company and manufacturer of HFIM measurement devices. (incl. photos, videos and further links)
- Talk by Dr. Peter-Christian Zinn concerning different applications of HFIM in the context of Smart Factories.
