= Impulse (dinghy) =

Sailboat class

Development
- Designer: Arthur Caldwell
- Location: Australia
- Year: 1975
- Builders: Tim Wilson Yacht Design; Formula Sailcraft
- Name: Impulse

Boat
- Displacement: 104 lb (47 kg)
- Draft: 2.00 ft (0.61 m) with centreboard down

Hull
- Type: monohull
- Construction: wood or fibreglass
- LOA: 13.12 ft (4.00 m)
- Beam: 4.94 ft (1.51 m)

Hull appendages
- Keel: centreboard
- Rudder: transom-mounted rudder

Rig
- Rig type: catboat rig

Sails
- Sailplan: catboat
- Mainsail area: 83.00 sq ft (7.711 m^{2})
- Total sail area: 83.00 sq ft (7.711 m^{2})

The Impulse is an Australian sailing dinghy that was designed by Arthur Caldwell as a one-design racer and first built in 1975.

== Production ==
The design was originally intended as a wooden boat for amateur construction, but has more recently been manufactured of fibreglass. In the past it was built by Tim Wilson Yacht Design, but that company is out of business. As of 2020, it is built by Formula Sailcraft (now known as the Dinghy Shop) in Williamstown, Victoria, Australia. Production started in 1975 and the type remains in production.

== Design ==
The Impulse is a recreational sailboat, built predominantly of wood or fibreglass. It has a catboat rig, a raked stem, a vertical transom, a transom-hung rudder controlled by a tiller and a retractable centreboard. It displaces 104 lb (47 kg).

The boat has a draft of 2.00 ft (0.61 m) with the centreboard extended and 3 in (7.6 cm) with it retracted, allowing beaching or ground transportation on a trailer or car roof rack.

== Operational history ==
The boat is supported by a class club, the Australian Impulse Sailing Association, which organizes racing events.

== See also ==
- List of sailing boat types

Similar sailboats

- Laser (dinghy)
