= Rustle noise =

Acoustics of rustling

Rustle noise is noise consisting of aperiodic pulses in a Poisson distribution, characterized by the average time between those pulses, known as rustle time (such as the mean time interval between clicks of a Geiger counter). Rustle time is determined by the fineness of sand, seeds, or shot in rattles, contributes heavily to the sound of sizzle cymbals, drum snares, drum rolls, and string drums, and makes subtle differences in string instrument sounds. Rustle time in strings is affected by different weights and widths of bows and by types of hair and rosin in strings. The concept is also applicable to flutter-tonguing, brass and woodwind growls, resonated vocal fry in woodwinds, and eructation sounds in some woodwinds. Robert Erickson suggests the exploration of accelerando-ritardando scales producible on some acoustic instruments and further variations in rustle noise "because this apparently minor aspect of musical sounds has a disproportionately large importance for higher levels--textures, ensemble timbres, [and] contrasts between music events." (Erickson 1975, p. 71-72)

== Sources ==
- Erickson, Robert (1975). Sound Structure in Music. University of California Press. ISBN 0-520-02376-5.
