= Quiz channel =

Type of television channel

A quiz channel (also known as a participation television channel) is a television channel that focuses on phone-in quizzes. The quizzes usually focus on puzzles, such as filling in blanks, identifying subjects, or other forms of word puzzles. The channels make money by encouraging viewers to call a toll phone number for the chance to play.

The first dedicated quiz channel is considered to be Germany's 9Live, which launched on 1 September 2001. The best known example in the United Kingdom is Quiz TV (2004–2006), the first to launch in that country. Two major commercial television networks, ITV and Channel Four Television Corporation, through Ostrich Media launched ITV Play and Quiz Call respectively to capitalize on the phenomenon. There are a large amount of quiz channels, particularly on satellite television, with many clones of each other. They are most common at night, where many smaller channels close down and show the quiz channel content in return for a share of the revenue. Portugal also has a substantial amount of quiz programmes, especially on terrestrial channels (including public RTP), however in the daytime they are disguised as pimba-themed talk shows, with blatant phone-in cutaways and quiz participation.

Due to a number of incidents where the fairness of quiz channels and shows came to the attention of the media and regulators in the UK, a number of broadcasters have switched to other types of participation television, focusing primarily on roulette but also bingo and other casino games as well as branching out into other forms of participation television, such as televised sex lines.

== Scandals in Britain ==
Most of the major controversies involving participatory television have occurred in the United Kingdom, where these shows have been late-night staples on some channels.

Quiz channels have received large number of complaints due to use of premium-rate telephone numbers, "impossible" questions and gambling. Often it is far from clear how it is possible to reach the suggested 'right' answer. Some people who are heavily involved in the quiz industry in the UK have complained about the standard and ambiguity of the questions used on the programme. Questions in some games, as an example, Quizmania's tower games are usually very easy and open ended, often with scores of possible answers, but only a handful of which win prizes. This means that the competition becomes less of a quiz and more like a game of chance. A Culture, Media and Sports select committee report suggested that the odds of a viewer getting through to the studio is up to 8,500 to one and for an ITV Play show, 400 to one.

Some estimates suggest that phone-in quizzes generate around £50 million a year for broadcasters, making them a crucial source of income at a time of increasing pressure on advertising revenue.

Ofcom proposed to class participation TV channels in the same way as teleshopping channels. This would give consumers more protection against fraudulent channels. According to an article in The Times, Ofcom was expected to receive an estimated 800 complaints about quiz channels in 2007, an increase from 450 in 2005.

=== Culture, media and sport select committee hearing ===
On 28 November 2006, an all-party Culture, Media and Sport select committee held a hearing into the concerns regarding the way that quiz channels operate. The broadcasting minister, Shaun Woodward said that no action would be taken on any of the quiz channel operators until the parties had reported their findings. The Gambling commission said they would look into British Sky Broadcasting's concerns over quiz channels that quiz channels are a form of gambling and should be regulated. Nick Rust from BSkyB, said to the committee that quiz channels should be considered gambling. The committee heard evidence from Ofcom, the Citizens Advice Bureau, television executives and individuals.

Points raised included the price of calls, whether the player got through or not. Jeff Henry, a director of ITV consumer said that one in four hundred players have a chance in getting through to The Mint programme. Henry also stated that by putting up details that there is a one in four hundred chance of winning, then "it would be out of date and we would be accused of misleading you." Points also raised were the answers given for questions set, including an example from ITV Play programme Quizmania, where the obscure answers Rawlplugs and balaclava were given for a question on the contents of a woman's handbag, and examples of where callers were cut off from calling Quiz Call for forty minutes. The commission was also told that viewers are encouraged to call in but are not told that they only have a 0.5% chance of getting through.

Shari Vahl, from BBC Radio 4's You and Yours programme told the committee that one woman had spent £1,500 on calls and suggested that programmes get 200 calls a minute, which makes getting through to the studio a slim chance. However, producers and operators of quiz shows and channels have stated that only a small minority of people have a problem with being addicted to calling shows and channels.

==== Report findings ====
On 25 January 2007, the select committee released its report into the participation television channel industry. The committee said that the channels should be classed as gambling and not a game of skill.

The report made a few recommendations as to how the industry should be regulated. These include more transparency to viewers on the odds of getting through to the studio, including a recommendation of the odds of getting through being shown by an on-screen graphic. The report also said that questions should be verified by a third party before they can be broadcast.

=== BIG Game TV! ===
BIG Game TV! was the subject of a City of London Police investigation brought by the BBC Radio 4 programme You and Yours in May 2006 over allegations that receptionists were told to ignore all incoming calls for long periods of time while 150-200 calls per minute were charged 75p a time. NTL subsequently removed the channel from their channel line-up on 7 June.

The City of London Police said there would be no charges brought against the channel, following its investigation.

=== British Sky Broadcasting – Quiz channels move on Sky Digital EPG ===
British Sky Broadcasting made an attempt to counter the problems somewhat by moving the EPG numbers of the channels on its Sky Digital service to the 840's section under the heading of "Gaming and Dating". Many of the quiz channels got around this by broadcasting on other channels, notably the general entertainment channels.

=== Gambling Commission Participation TV consultation ===
By law, only charities and Camelot are allowed to run lotteries. Any prize competitions in newspapers, magazines and television shows have to be "games of skill". In an effort to crack down on unofficial lotteries the Government is insisting that television phone-in quizzes become harder since it claims they are otherwise games of chance.

In August 2006, the Gambling Commission in the United Kingdom started a consultation regarding the way that participation television operate. The consultation is designed to clear up the confusion between prize competitions, free draws and lotteries, ahead of the Gambling Act 2005, which came into force in September 2007. If the consultation shows that participation TV shows and channels operate more like lotteries rather than games of skill, they could be required by law to give 20% of their revenue to charity.

Under the new Gambling Act, the Gambling Commission will have the power to prosecute broadcasters if it believes they are persistently flouting the law by running illegal lotteries. "There are already rules, but what the Gambling Act does is introduce a better definition so that the rules are enforceable", said a spokesman for the Department of Culture, Media and Sport. "At the moment the rules are not clear enough to prevent these kinds of quizzes where the questions are ridiculously easy in order to maximise the number of entrants".

=== ICSTIS ===
The United Kingdom premium phone regulator, ICSTIS has reported an increase in complaints about quiz shows and channels. A BBC News article stated that "nearly 10% of all enquiries about premium rate services received by ICSTIS between September and November last year were specifically regarding television contests".

On 10 October 2006 ICSTIS announced that it would be investigating participation television channels after complaints it received from the public into concerns that players are paying too much to enter the quizzes by phone. ICSTIS also said that it wanted callers to know how much each call would cost them and the odds of winning any prize. ICSTIS raised concern that players were unaware that they would be charged for each call regardless of whether the player got through to the studio or not.

On 9 March 2007, in the wake of a number of technical problems and controversies over premium rate phone-ins on television shows and quiz channels, ICSTIS warned television companies that any illegal operating would be investigated by the police. ICSTIS also announced measures to bring in licensing to restore public confidence in competitions.

=== ITV Play ===
Criticisms about Quizmania, The Mint and other, similar phone-in quiz shows and television channels have been levelled by various groups of people.

Some people who are heavily involved in the quiz industry in the UK have complained about the standard and ambiguity of the questions used on the programme. Questions in the tower games (see above) are usually very easy and open ended, often with scores of possible answers, but only a handful of which win prizes. This means that the competition becomes less of a quiz and more like a game of chance.

Organisations such as the Gambling Commission have expressed concerns that Quizmania and similar programmes encourage gambling. HM Treasury began an examination of the regulations surrounding phone-in quiz shows. Phone-in game shows are scrutinised by Ofcom, the UK's communications regulator and ICSTIS, who regulate premium rate phone numbers in the UK; both organisations have received complaints from viewers about phone-in game shows.

An article on the BBC website noted that "ICSTIS - the organisation that regulates premium rate telephone services in the UK - had acknowledged that the growth in the number of puzzle channels has been "matched by an increase in complaints about them".

According to this article, "nearly 10% of all enquiries about premium rate services received by Icstis between September and November last year were specifically regarding television contests".

Despite the criticisms, Quizmania became the first live and interactive quizshow to broadcast on analogue terrestrial television.

=== Quiz Call ===
In a Sunday Times article published on 24 September, Quiz Call admitted that it had taken calls at 75p a call without any chance of the callers getting through for a chance to win and Quiz Call apologised for using its own staff members to pose as winners. Channel 4 have since sold off Quiz Call due to increasing levels of bad reputation from the channel.

In the Culture, Media and Sport committee held on 28 November 2006 representatives from Quiz Call admitted that one instance of people being put on hold did occur and that the producer responsible no longer works for Ostrich Media.

=== 2007 television phone-in scandals ===
In 2007, a series of scandals broke out involving allegations of phone-in segments of television programmes and quiz channels conning viewers.

Richard & Judy on Channel 4 were accused of encouraging viewers to enter the "You Say We Pay" segment after the winner had been picked. The competition was indefinitely suspended soon afterwards and was later cancelled permanently. Channel 4 Racing was also affected after a software glitch allowed callers to enter a competition even though the competition had ended.

ITV suspended all programmes involving premium rate phone-ins on 5 March 2007, including its quiz channel ITV Play. This was to allow independent auditor Deloitte to conduct a review of the fairness of revenue-generating phone-ins in programmes carried by ITV including Dancing on Ice and The X Factor. ITV Play was taken off the air during the review, but for a few days it ran a limited after midnight service for only four hours before on 13 March, ITV announced that ITV Play had been permanently closed down.

Five followed suit when they were alleged to have displayed the name of a fictional winner on BrainTeaser after they failed to find a genuine winner. Five was later fined £300,000 by Ofcom; the highest ever amount from the broadcasting watchdog.

The BBC was also affected by these scandals. Saturday Kitchen on BBC One were accused of encouraging viewers to phone in to a pre-recorded programme. On 14 March 2007 the BBC children's programme Blue Peter was revealed to have used a girl who was visiting the studio to pose as a caller live on the show. The BBC stated that a technical error prevented 14,000 callers from getting a chance to win in the competition. Konnie Huq apologised over the phone-in problem on the 14 March broadcast of the show.

On 20 March 2007 it was revealed that 11,500 votes for the Dancing on Ice final three days earlier on ITV were lost as they were not delivered to Vodafone until the following Monday morning. On 23 April 2007, a BBC Panorama investigation disclosed that callers to GMTV's phone-in competitions may have been defrauded out of millions of pounds, because the telephone system operator, Opera Interactive Technology, had determined the winners before the phone lines had closed. GMTV responded by suspending the phone-in quizzes, but claimed that "it was confident it had not breached regulators' codes". Opera Interactive also denied any wrongdoing.

The BBC suspended all phone-in competitions indefinitely on 18 July 2007, after further revelations about faked competition winners, including incidents during the charity broadcasts Comic Relief and Children in Need.

Newspapers reported on 26 July 2007 that ITV's broadcast of the 2005 British Comedy Awards had also been conning viewers.

== See also ==
- 1950s quiz show scandals in the United States
- List of quiz channels
