= Bingo Night Live =

- Presented by: Anthony Crank; Nichola Dixon; Jayne Sharp; Michael Underwood; Mike Toolan (Relief); Jenny Powell (Relief); Melinda Messenger (2008)
- Country of origin: United Kingdom

Production
- Executive producer: Michael Kelpie
- Running time: 60 Mins

Original release
- Network: ITV (Not STV)
- Release: 4 June – 29 November 2008

Bingo Night Live was an interactive television programme featuring a free-to-play bingo game, broadcast in the United Kingdom (except in northern and central Scotland) on ITV (ITV1 and UTV). It aired between 4 June 2008 and 29 November 2008.

== Background ==
ITV had introduced ITV Play to some criticism, attracting significant negative publicity for the group, initially for the perceived poor quality of the shows provided. More criticism was to come when several British TV companies were caught up in a series of scandals related to the manipulation of phone-in quizzes, and the significant revenues generated from Premium rate telephone numbers.

Following investigation by UK regulator Ofcom, the ITV Play channel was axed shortly afterwards but with programmes retained on the ITV Network after midnight. It was announced on 12 September 2007 that ITV was to close the "ITV Play" brand and its shows on the ITV Network 'by the end of 2007'.

The final edition of Glitterball was broadcast on 30 September 2007. Make Your Play was then extended to 6 nights a week, until the closure of the brand on 23 December 2007. ITV Play on digital channel ITV2 ended at the start of November 2007. The ITV Play website was renamed as ITV Games in September 2007, with the ITV Play brand only used for itv.com's Bingo, Casino and Poker websites.

Having introduced a documentary series Nightwatch with Steve Scott to fill the slot, ITV advertisers wanted a return to a more youth-oriented game show format.

== Format ==
Bingo Night Live was a simple and free bingo game, split into:

- Four (originally three) games of bingo (green, orange, blue and - added later - purple cards). Prizes were given for:
  - One line
  - Two lines
  - A "Golden Jackpot" prize, starting at £25,000 on launch night, given for a full card with less than 32 numbers called
  - A full ticket ('Full House')

The show originally aired five times per week (Tuesday to Saturday), and were presented by a total of three presenters:

- a game caller (Anthony Crank, Michael Underwood or Mike Toolan)
- a statistician (Nichola Dixon)
- a supporting presenter for the phone-in segments of the show (Melinda Messenger or Jenny Powell)

Before play started, UK astrologer Russell Grant gave a pre-recorded view of the players' possibilities of winning according to their astrological sign.

At moments during each bingo game, the game was stopped and statistician controller Nichola Dixon provided player statistics, lucky star signs, facts and figures, based on live data of players active during that specific show.

Each of the first two games were followed by phone-in interactive games, initially fronted by Melinda Messenger. These provided additional cash prizes to be won, with normally two extra games played, such as "Magic Numbers" and "Minute to Win It". Later, this was reduced to one phone-in game. After her departure, Jenny Powell replaced Messenger as hostess of this part of the show, until Powell's absence through pregnancy led to Nichola Dixon being required to cover. This meant that occasionally there were only two presenters for the whole programme.

On 30 August 2008, it was announced a fourth game of Bingo (the purple game) would be introduced, to compensate for the reduction in the number of shows from five to three per week. "Minute to Win It" was removed, though the "Magic Number" game remained. New segments such as "Movie Reviews" were introduced. The podium from where the phone-in games were played was moved closer to statistician's desk, meaning that only two presenters were required. The section of the stage where all three presenters had stood at the start of each show was removed.

On 2 October 2008, it was announced that the Golden Jackpot bonus, which had been increasing by £500 since launch night without being won, would be given away on 10 October 2008 to the winner of a full house on the final game, provided it was not won through the normal rules before that point. The amount guaranteed to be given away was £60,000. On the night, Michael from Margate won a total of £60,500 on the blue game, the winning prize including the full house win of £500 plus the jackpot of £60,000. At the end of the show, it was announced by an official adjudicator of the Guinness Book of World Records that the Bingo Night Live players had made a world record for the world's largest online bingo game, and that every valid player involved in the show would get their own Guinness World Record certificate.

On 19 October 2008, the "Minute To Win It" phone-in game returned each Saturday, giving magic number winners from Wednesday, Thursday and Friday the chance of a £500 win. From this point, the show increased to four nights per week (Wednesday to Saturday). Additionally, the purple bingo game was turned into a turbo round where there was no one-line or two-line win, only the full house win with a chance of the golden jackpot. The numbers were read out at twice the normal speed, accompanied by a faster remix of the original background music.

On 8 November 2008, it was announced that Bingo Night Live would be coming to an end, with the final show being aired on 15 November 2008. During the show on 14 November 2008, it was announced that - as with the show on 10 October 2008 - the Golden Jackpot would be won again on the final show, if not won beforehand. Mike Toolan and Jayne Sharp were the presenters of the final show, during which it was announced that over the 6 months of broadcasting, prizes totaling £500,000 had been won by 15,000 winners.

== Production ==
The show was produced in a one-hour format by A2 Media Group on behalf of ITV, with the first show televised from 4 June 2008. The programme was broadcast from the studios of Granada Television in Manchester.

The registration service and the actual game was technically run by partner The Gaming Channel, a division of Mirada plc, via its subsidiary Gaming Channel Bookmakers Ltd which was licensed to run the game by the UK Gaming Commission. Participants could then either play by printing out their cards and playing in standard "dobbing" format with a pen; online live where the computer marks their card in front of them; or online automatically, whereby the participant did not need to watch the show.

ITV plc claimed that Bingo Night Live boasted the biggest Bingo set on television – "all designed to give viewers all the entertainment, tension and drama you'd expect from a great game of Bingo – but all in the comfort of your own home." The numbers drawn during each game show up on the large "Wall of Numbers" and were marked as they are called by the presenter. The game was stopped as both participants won the various prizes, as well as to increase player tension when statistician controller Dixon showed player statistics, lucky star signs, facts and figures.

== Criticism ==
=== STV ===
Bingo Night Live was not broadcast on STV (the ITV broadcaster in northern and central Scotland), reportedly owing to a dispute over costs and associated advertising revenues. However, viewers in the two STV regions (STV North and STV Central) could view the show through Sky Digital on the ITV London AD feed, on Virgin Media on the ITV audio description service, or online at itv.com.

=== Technical breakdowns ===
Bingo Night Live was ITV's first interactive televised/web programme. At launch there were various problems with the reliability of the web interface. On 17 July 2008 Bingo Night Live was not shown due to a power cut in the Greater Manchester area. The show was replaced with re-runs of Creature Comforts and TV's Naughtiest Blunders. An email explaining the fault was sent to all players telling them "You do not need to do anything further; your cards will be automatically carried across to tonight’s show and entered into the next games".

Further technical problems were encountered on 26 October 2008 where the second game of the show ran into difficulties after the second number was called. The game was abandoned whilst on air, although it continued to run via the Bingo Night Live website. The show was temporarily replaced with a rerun of Creature Comforts while the problems were resolved, before coming back on air for the two remaining games of the night.
