= BrainTeaser =

British television series

- Created by: Joop van den Ende (Endemol Holland)
- Presented by: Alex Lovell; Craig Stevens (Note: Craig Stevens remained as a relief presenter after 2005 until the show's end.); Jonny Gould; Rachel Pierman
- Country of origin: United Kingdom
- Original language: English
- No. of episodes: 1122

Production
- Running time: 60 minutes 220 minutes (YooPlay version)
- Production companies: Endemol UK Productions Midlands (2002–2004); Cheetah Television West (2004–2007) (Note: Known as Endemol UK Productions West or simply Endemol West until 2006)

Original release
- Network: Five; YooPlay TV (2005-2006)
- Release: 5 August 2002 – 7 March 2007

BrainTeaser is a British game show based on the original Dutch format of Puzzeltijd (English: Puzzle Time). The show was broadcast live, with phone-in viewer puzzles being announced and played during the show in addition to the studio game. During its run from 5 August 2002 to 7 March 2007, it aired on Five Mondays to Fridays, usually for an hour around lunchtime, and was fronted by various presenters rotating with one another (most notably Alex Lovell, who was the only presenter to front the show for the entirety of its run). Beginning in August 2005, a version of the show that exclusively focused on viewer participation was broadcast in a four-hour long block on YooPlay TV (a joint-venture between Five and YooPlay) every day after the Five broadcast, as part of a thirteen-week trial.

Channel 5 suspended the programme on 8 March 2007 after it was revealed that the production company, Cheetah Productions, had misled viewers regarding winners of the viewer puzzles (which were entered using a premium-rate phone number). Actions included publishing fictional names and presenting a member of the production team as a 'winner'. On 26 June 2007, Channel 5 announced that the show had been cancelled after 1122 episodes after media regulator Ofcom fined the channel £300,000.

== Presenters ==
Initially, the show was presented by Alex Lovell and Craig Stevens, who alternated with one another week by week. They were joined later in the show's run by Rachel Pierman. After Stevens' and Pierman's departure in early 2004, Lovell alternated with Jonny Gould.

At the end of 2005, Gould left the show and was not replaced, leaving Lovell the sole presenter apart from occasional breaks (which were usually covered by former regular host Craig Stevens).

== Format ==
=== 2006–2007 format ===
The most recent format ran from 15 November 2006 until the show's suspension and its eventual cancellation. In each show, there were four contestants, all of which play the first three rounds. The lowest-scoring contestant is eliminated after each of the third, sixth and eighth rounds, so that only one is left standing for the Pyramid.

Except for Word Wheel and the final Pyramid game, all rounds are on the buzzers, with the opponent given a chance to answer if the player who first buzzed in answers incorrectly.

==== Rounds played by four contestants ====
===== Scramble =====
The studio

Words of eight or more letters are partitioned into four or five pieces, rearranged and presented to the contestants, who must unscramble them. Only five points per correct answer are scored in this round. In all other rounds, each correct answer scores ten points.

===== Clued Up =====
This is a general knowledge round. Contestants must identify something (a famous person, TV show, film, place, etc.) from the clues. First the category appears, followed by four short clues revealed one by one. If a contestant buzzes in but fails to give the correct answer, the clues continue to be revealed. When all players but one have attempted to answer it, all four clues are revealed for the remaining player.

===== Trio =====
Three letters are given. Contestants must give a word that contains the three letters in the given order.

This is similar to the main game principle in Catchword and the In a Spin round of Masterteam. However, there are two differences:

1. The first given letter need not be at the beginning of the word.
2. The second and third letters may not occur prematurely, even if they also occur in the correct sequence. For example, given the letters C L O, the word "colour" is not allowed, since an O occurs before the L.

After the end of Trio, the contestant with the lowest score is eliminated, and the other three contestants continue, with their scores set back to zero. For the first few days under this format, the scores from the previous rounds were retained at this stage, and reset to zero only after Word Wheel.

==== Rounds played by three contestants ====
===== Wordplay =====
The players are shown a word with the letters in the wrong order. Letters drop one at a time into the line below in the correct place, until one contestant buzzes in with the right answer.

===== Definitions =====
The players are shown a word and three possible definitions. The players must buzz in and select the correct one. If the player gets it wrong, he or she is frozen out and that definition is removed. The remaining two players are allowed to buzz in and offer one of the remaining definitions. Often, there is a common theme to the definitions given for a word.

The principle is similar to Call My Bluff or the board game Balderdash; the words are generally less obscure than those featured in these games, but still unusual enough to challenge most players.

===== Word Wheel =====
A word of at least ten letters is shown in the correct order, but on a wheel so that the letters are arranged clockwise in a circle. The contestant who buzzes in with the answer receives 10 points. From then on, play moves from left to right with no buzzing, beginning with the player who identified the word, and each player in turn must offer a word at least four letters long, and they receive one point for every letter of the word. For example, from RATIONALLY the players could offer TRAY for 4 points, TRAIN for 5 points or RATION for 6 points.

For the first few days of this format, there was an additional twist: Any player who failed to give a word when his/her turn comes round, or gave an invalid word, was frozen out for the rest of the round. Should all players be frozen out before the end of the round (this happened only once), a new word would be given and all contestants would be back in play. Now, all three players who reach this round remain in play throughout the round.

One contestant is eliminated after this round, so that two remain. The scores are again set back to zero.

==== Rounds played by two contestants ====
===== Crossfire =====
This is a general knowledge crossword game. The computer randomly selects the first clue to be presented to the contestants. The player who correctly answers each clue then chooses the next clue to be solved. If neither player can give a correct answer, the answer is revealed and the next clue is chosen randomly again.

Prior to 2005, this was not a quick-fire round. Instead, one player had control at a time, starting with the player who scored the most points in Scramble. The player who has control had the first attempt at answering each clue, and control passed only when a player failed to answer correctly. If neither player could give a correct answer, the control stayed with the second player to whom it was offered.

===== Wordstorm =====
Contestants must find a word with the given number of letters and the given first and last letters.

==== Pyramid ====
The winner of the rounds played by two contestants plays the solo pyramid game. The player must find words of increasing length, each of which adds a letter to the previous word. The initial three-letter word is given, and for each word the new letter is given in its correct place; the letters of the previous word are rearranged to arrive at the new word. Sometimes there may be more than one word that fits the letters, but only one word is the correct one.

The contestant has 45 seconds to complete the pyramid, and there is no limit on the number of words the contestant may try before arriving at the correct one. When each word is correctly identified, the clock stops and the player may choose to continue or to stop and take the winnings. If the player chooses to continue, then the new letter is revealed and the clock started again from where it left off. If the player then fails to get the word within the remaining time, he/she wins only £100. The prize money for a contestant who stops and takes the money (or who completes the pyramid by getting the eight-letter word) is as follows:

- 4-letter word: £200
- 5-letter word: £500
- 6-letter word: £750
- 7-letter word: £1,500
- 8-letter word: £3,000

Before 2005, there was no prize money for a contestant who runs out of time while playing the pyramid.

=== 2002–06 format ===
Before the change to the most recent format, only two contestants played at a time. The first three rounds were Scramble, Crossfire and Trio, and these were played in two heats, therefore all four contestants played these three rounds. The winner of each heat went into the "semi-final", comprising the rounds Clued Up and Wordstorm. (The "final" is the solo Pyramid game.)

Prior to 2005, Wordplay was played instead of Trio, and Wordstorm preceded Clued Up in the semi-final. Wordplay had two differences from the round in the more recent format:

- If one contestant buzzed in and failed to give the correct solution, only one more letter in the solution was revealed for the other player.
- The letters did not disappear from the original anagram as they were revealed in the solution as they did more recently (this does not directly affect the gameplay).

== Viewer puzzle ==
Throughout the show, phone-in viewer puzzles are announced. Viewers enter by calling a premium-rate telephone number, and one caller is randomly selected to solve the puzzle. Normally, three viewer puzzles are played in the course of the show, for increasing amounts of prize money. The prize values have varied throughout the show's history; initially they were typically £250, £500 and £750 or £1,000; by 2006, they were usually £500, £1,000 and £2,000 respectively. There were also various occasional twists to this aspect of the show, including other variations in the prize values, having one, two or four puzzles in a show instead of the usual three, and various bonus games (mostly games of chance) by which a caller can win even more money. These are usually themed to an event (e.g. Wimbledon) or a season (e.g. snow).

Two kinds of viewer puzzle are regularly featured:

- Scramble – a single puzzle of the kind played in the Scramble round by the contestants, usually played only for the first puzzle of each show.
- Pyramid – similar to the final round of the show, but filled in except for one line in which only the letter added from the row above is given.

There are also three kinds of puzzles that are occasionally featured instead:

- Linkword – the viewer must work out the word that connects the two given words to form compound words or phrases.
- Celebagram – the parts of a famous person's name are scrambled letter by letter.
- A game similar to that played on Quizmania and The Mint, in which callers must guess entities with some common theme to win money. This is run as a single game throughout the show in which several callers are taken, and is usually titled according to the theme.

The presenters often give clues to the words to aid those unable to work it out, though these often make the puzzles very easy. For example, on one occasion when the word was 'sister', the presenter said 'This type of nurse might look after you on a ward', and later, 'Michael Jackson has one called Janet'.

An addition partway through the programme's lifetime was an extra viewer puzzle announced at the end of the show and again during the commercial breaks of the following programme. This is often a Scramble puzzle, but for a prize of £1,000.

== Cancellation ==
In light of the ICSTIS investigation of the use of premium-rate telephone numbers in various interactive British television programmes as part of a phone-in scandal, Cheetah Productions (a division of Endemol), who created the BrainTeaser format, admitted that some of the show's contestants were fake.

On 8 March 2007, Channel 5 resultantly suspended all shows involving premium rate services, claiming they knew nothing about the scam. However, a simple procedure checking daily winners would have easily identified the fraudulent activity instantly. Channel 5 later admitted that the channel's senior producer was informed by Cheetah Productions that several winners had been fake. The channel ignored this advice and continued to broadcast the show until the ICSTIS investigation was concluded. During this time, Avon and Somerset Constabulary reviewed the reports from Channel 5 and the ICSTIS to see if there were any allegations or evidence of criminal wrongdoing contrary to the Fraud Act 2006.

Once the ICSTIS investigation was completed on 26 June 2007, Ofcom handed out a record-breaking fine of £300,000 to Channel 5 for the phone-in scandal. The channel cancelled the show, after 1122 episodes. The Ofcom report found the use of fake winners had begun as an expedient to help the continuity of the live format; as such, fakery was not used frequently until 2007 when with the introduction of the Quickfire format to the viewers' quiz led to time constraints on sourcing contestants becoming more pressing. A system was in place that labelled callers Blue, Red or Green; these represented a caller with a correct answer ('blue'), a caller with a wrong answer ('red') or no winner could be found ('green'), in which case a fake name or staff member would be substituted. Endemol claimed their original intention when using 'green calls' was to select a genuine winner after the show; however, this only happened once. Both Channel 5 management and Endemol UK have subsequently apologised.

== International versions ==
Country	Name	Host(s)	TV channel(s)	Year aired	Note
Netherlands (original format)	Puzzeltijd	Stella Gommans (1999–2003); Lucille Werner (1999–2001); Kim-Lian van der Meij (2001–2002); Ellemieke Vermolen (2002); John Williams (1999–2000); Monique Hugen (2003–2005); Odette Simons (2004–2005); Arlette Adriani (2003–2004); Valerie Zwikker (2003–2004); Sanne Heijen (2003–2004; 2005–2006); Jeremy Sno (2004–2005); Kevin Brouwer (2004); Denise Koopal (2004–2005); Lutein van Kranen (2004–2005); Marilou le Grand (2002–2003); Dounia Lkoundi (2006); Jacqueline Vizee (2006); Doesjka Doobelt (2002); Nick Nielsen (May 2006)	Veronica	1999–2001	
Netherlands (original format)	Puzzeltijd		RTL 5	1999–2001	
Netherlands (original format)	Puzzeltijd		Yorin	2001	
Netherlands (original format)	Puzzeltijd		RTL 4	1999–2006	
Belgium	Puzzeltijd	Anneke De Keersmaeker (2004–2006); Anne De Baetzelier (2004–2006); Tess Goossens (2004–2007); Bart Van den Bossche (2005–2009); Amaryllis Temmerman (2007–2008); Filip D'Haeze (2007–2008); Lynn Pelgroms (2008); Stephanie Meire (2007–2009); Vicky Jolling (2008–2009)	VTM	2004–2009	The Vlaanderen region version
Belgium	Le Mot Gagnant	Agathe Lecaron	RTL-TVI	2004–2006	The Wallonie region version
Chile	El que sabe, sabe	Pilar Rodríguez	UCV Televisión	2009	
Indonesia	Teka Teki	Sophie Navita; Alya Rohali; Sony Tulung	TPI	2006	
Poland	Tele Gra	Agnieszka Wróblewska; Ireneusz Bieleninik; Małgorzata Opczowska	TVN	17 January 2002 – 29 December 2004	
Portugal	Quem Quer Ganha	Iva Domingues (2003–2008); Leonor Poeiras (2006–2010); Teresa Peres (2008–2009)	TVI	2003–2010	
Sweden	Ordjakten	Sofia Isaksson; Linda Bengtzing; Maria Lodenborg; Paulinne Arpi	TV4	2003–2007	
Russia	Алло, ТВ!	Ekaterina Shemyakina; Maxim Pokrovsky; Valery Zakutsky; Kamil Fatkullin; Yulia Solnechnaya	TV Centre	12 December 2004 – 28 July 2006	
Venezuela	Rompe Coco	Alexandra Rodriguez	Televen	2007–2009	DRAMA 654
Vietnam	Ô chữ vàng	Kim Phượng; Trúc Mai	CVTV2 - VTV Can Tho	14 April 2007 – 2010	Mekong Delta Area version
Vietnam	Chìa khóa vàng	Thùy Dương	DVTV - VTV Da Nang	2007 – 23 January 2011	The Central Area version
Vietnam	Khám phá chữ Việt	Dương Hồng Phúc	VTV9	5 March 2008 – 29 April 2009	The Southern area version
Vietnam	Chơi chữ	Thanh Tùng; Thu Hà; Thùy Trang	HanoiTV	12 November 2009 – 2012	The Northern area version

== See also ==
- Wordplay
