= List of games played on The Mint =

This is a list of games played on the British game show The Mint.

== Games ==
=== 5 Rings ===
The first game often played each night on The Mint features 5 red phones (props) on a desk in front of The Mint (vault). Viewers must answer a simple question (duplicate answers do not count as correct answers). If a viewer answers the current question correctly, they will win a guaranteed sum of money (usually £500) and get a chance at unlocking The Mint by guessing a 3-digit pin code. Questions involve on-screen words that fit into a particular category (often celebrities' names) with the vowels missing. The answers are made even easier to find due to the presenters also giving out clues as to who or what the question refers. After 5 calls have been taken, the game ends.

=== Famous Sevens/Famous Sixes/Famous Fives ===
These are similar to other phone-in quiz shows' ladder/tower games where viewers must come up with answers to fit into a specific category, for example, 'Name sitcoms' or 'Name famous blond(e)s'. The game is made much more difficult as viewers tuning in later often give duplicate answers. If the games go on too long, the presenters have to give out clues to try and finish off the game. The ladder games usually happen during the time that a special guest is being interviewed on the sofa. These games usually have some relevance to the guest. For example, naming children's TV shows when Geoffrey from 'Rainbow' was on. The presenter interviews the guest between talking to callers and taking their answers. The guest occasionally answers calls. The cash values on 'Famous Sevens' normally start at £500 or £1000 and the top answer is worth £10,000.

=== Treasure Island ===
In this game viewers first have to answer a simple question that has numerous possible answers. An example of one of these questions would be "Name a US State" (duplicate answers are disallowed). Contestants giving correct answers will have a go at picking a number on the Treasure Island board. The board has a photograph of an island printed on it and has 36 square panels. Behind each panel hides a sum of money. There are 10 lots of £100, 10 lots of £200, 10 £250s, 4 lots of £500, one £1000 and one £2000 square to be uncovered. The highest sums of money (£500, £1000 and £2000) also give the winner a chance at unlocking The Mint. This game also involves a group of 5 live contestants that differ each night (for example, 5 male lifeguards or 5 hairdressers). After a few phone contestants have had a go at the Treasure Island board, the contestants in the studio have to answer the same question and guess a number from 1-36 on the board. These live guests can win money and also have the chance of unlocking The Mint if they win one of the higher amounts. Clues are also given in this game after a while, such as "Think South" meaning to pick numbers on the lower half of the board. Once the £2000 has been uncovered the game ends. If this doesn't happen for a set-time, the game ends after a certain number of calls have been taken (normally between 10-14 calls). Often when Brian Dowling and Beverley French present this game, it is renamed "Dowling Island" with a makeshift sign.

It was reported by Beverley French that Dowling Island is currently closed for renovation over the winter period.

=== Wordsearch ===
A six by six square word search is displayed on the LCD TV screen facing the viewers and words that fit into a specific category (such as 'Snow White's Dwarves' or 'Human Emotions') must be found. There are usually four to six words to find (worth £100 each). During The Wicked Wordsearch on Extra Mint, the last word to be found became the 'Golden Word' and was worth more money.

=== Retail Therapy ===
Either the guest or presenter has supposedly been out shopping and viewers have to guess what they have in their shopping bag. The viewers can ask the guest/presenter a simple question where they must answer with either 'yes' or 'no'. After the contestant has asked one question, they get the chance to guess what the item is. This game is very different from anything else seen on a phone-in quiz show, but the presenters sometimes have trouble with the callers who find it difficult to speak in sentences (in every other game, viewers only have to give their name and their answer). Due to the problem this caused, the presenters give out clues at specified intervals and contestants are now only asked guess what they think the item is.

=== Chinese Takeaway ===
This is essentially a matching pairs game. A board is displayed (similar to the one used in 'Treasure Island') with numbered panels marked '1' to '25'. Behind each of these panels are different pictures of either a roast duck, a bowl of rice or a golden version of each of these. Contestants calling the show don't answer a question but give the presenter two numbers. The aim of this is to reveal a picture and then match it with the opposite dish. A 'duck' and a 'rice' makes a meal and awards the contestant with £250. When contestants make a mismatch the two panels are turned back around; future callers must memorise their positions. Whenever a golden panel is found this is also turned back around (even if successfully matched with an opposite dish). If the contestant manages to reveal the 2 golden pictures, they win the top prize of £2000 (and a chance at opening The Mint) and the game ends.

=== Instant Cash (alternate jackpot game) ===
At a determined interval in the show, a winning contestant will be given the choice between attempting to guess the 4-digit code that unlocks The Mint, or playing 'Instant Cash'. In this alternate jackpot game the player chooses from 8 tea pot lids (changed from bowler hats and pan lids after the first couple of episodes) which are labelled from numbers 1 to 8. Under each lid is a letter that form the word The Mint. The aim is to choose tea pot lids that spell out The Mint in order to win the prize amount of £5000. However, if the player is unsuccessful, they may still win amounts of money if they are able to spell another word that is in the dictionary (for example the word 'hint' can be spelled using the letters that spell The Mint). A variation of this game has 5 large bottles filled with different amounts of green liquid. The contestant must choose 3 bottles to use to fill an oversized cocktail glass. The glass has marked levels on the side and depending on how high up the liquid comes, the contestant wins varying sums of money. The maximum win on this game is £1000.

=== Snake Words ===
A board with 9 letters appear on the screen and the viewer must figure out a word from the scrambled letters however the words aren't jumbled up they go in a sequence.

=== Missing Link ===
Two words are given with a space in the middle. Viewers have to correctly guess the missing link. For example, Big ______ Pie with the link being 'Apple' so the completed format would be Big Apple Pie, as both 'Big Apple' and 'Apple Pie' are common phrases. The screen is usually filled with 6 questions and the viewer can decide which one they want to attempt.

=== Complete the word ===
A four letter word appears on screen with the latter half blanked out. Viewers have to guess which remaining two letters complete the word. There are often a large number of possibilities as to what the word is. If they get it right an envelope (that is present on-screen throughout the entire game to prove there was no underhand trickery) containing the answer is opened and shown to the viewer. An example of a word once played; SA__, the answer being SAGE. Once, the prize offered for this was even larger than the Mint jackpot at a staggering £140,000. This jackpot was never won and the offered prize hasn't reappeared since, despite mention that it would again be up for grabs at a later date.

=== Wild Bingo ===
Basically, a memory game that was only played on the afternoon Extra Mint shows. The viewer is shown a board of numbers and has to memorize where they are. The numbers are then replaced with letters. The presenter draws a ball from a machine and the viewer has to say where the two numbers on the ball are situated on the board to win the cash sum offered.

=== Add the numbers ===
This was a game that remained unsolved for many months. The basic premise of the game was extremely simple but as usual, the solution was much more involved.

The game appeared onscreen as follows:

NINETEEN MINUS FIVE =
4 + 3 X 2 =
6 - 5 =

After many weeks and hundreds of different answers, the correct answer was revealed to be 2106. Although there was no official explanation as to how this answer had been arrived at, a plausible explanation involving the use of Roman numerals has been suggested.

The £36,000 winner made an appearance on the show on the night of 5 October and drank champagne with Beverley French.
