= Avago (TV channel) =

UK and Ireland television channel

Ownership
- Owner: YooMedia

History
- Launched: 4 July 2002
- Closed: 4 October 2006

Avago (have a go) was a gaming television channel in the United Kingdom and Ireland. It was launched on 4 July 2002.

== Games ==
There were numerous games viewers would play on Avago, by pressing the red button on the Sky+ remote. The main game was Avago Balls, a live bingo game. Other games included Spin 2 Win and Trackside. The official Avago website game's descriptions:

- Avago Balls "Our live, interactive, presenter – led show makes Avago Balls truly unique. Play along with the presenter through your TV and watch your numbers make you a winner."
- Roulette "Just like the real thing. Load up our Roulette game and stake your bets on the classic Roulette board."
- Spin 2 Win "Play Spin to Win, our Roulette style game. Just put your chips on the table and see which number comes up. There's a new spin every minute, 24/7, so you never miss out. Check this out!"
- Avago Instants "Just select Play for Real within the Avago Balls game. Choose the 'Instants' option. Get a card, change it if you don't like it and we'll do the rest! Cards cost £1. Come and join the fun – get involved with Instants today! Where else can you win instant money with each game?"
- Super Bingo Keno "Choose your lucky card in this classic Bingo Keno game and place your stake. When the balls are drawn from the machine, the more you match, the more you win!"
- Cash Keno "A classic Keno game with the added turbo feature. Simply select up to 15 numbers from a grid of 1 to 80 and let the 20 balls drawn decide your win. The more you match, the more your win!"
- Trackside "Trackside is our racing game, running all day and all night. It's all the fun of a real day at the races, and we can now offer a fuller choice of bets; Win Bets; Reverse Forecasts; Tricasts and Combination Tricasts. If that's double Dutch to you, just follow our simple instructions once inside the game."

Avago also played Big Shuffle, a live card-turning game in which viewers bet on whether the next card turned would be higher or lower than the current one.

== Avago Balls ==
Avago Balls was the main game on the channel; it was a live show that broadcast on the channel for ten hours every day. It worked in a similar way to bingo with presenters pulling the balls and players buying electronic playing cards. The interactivity was emphasised with text messages being read while the balls were being pulled, a daily poll on a topical issue voted via the Sky+ remote again while playing and special prizes such as a weekly draw.

No actual skill (or activity) was required to "play" Avago Balls. Players bought "cards" via their Sky remote handsets, and watched as the system checked them automatically against the balls that had been drawn. Claiming a win was done automatically too.

One major innovation was that each player's cards were superimposed onto the broadcast picture by software running in their Sky set-top box (the box had to remain connected to Avago by phone during play; this link was used to download the cards' numbers and patterns). This gave a much stronger illusion of actually participating in game of skill rather than a lottery.

Avago Balls was a revised version of the game that was played when the channel first launched. In the original version (called "Avago – The Biggest Numbers Game in Town"), each game continued until someone had filled the required pattern of squares (like traditional Bingo). This resulted in relatively few winners, and long games (sometimes 30 balls or more on large patterns).

In the revised ("Avago Balls") version, each game was a fixed length of 15 balls. Anyone who matched at least one square was deemed a "winner", and those who had matched the most squares (typically five or more) had their names displayed and read out by the presenters.

== Rebrand to Gala TV ==
On 22 December 2005, Yoomedia announced the sale of Avago to the gambling operator Gala Coral. The deal was said to be worth £5.1m in a move which would see the channel rebrand as Gala Bingo in the 3rd quarter of 2006.

Gala TV launched on 4 October 2006. It was planned for the channel to also launch on Virgin Media / NTL, but this never happened and was only broadcast on Sky, Freesat and online. The only presenter from Avago to move to Gala TV was Liv Kennard.

== Presenters ==
The longest lasting presenters were Mark Pell, Jemish Patel, Charlotte Gane, Lawrie Jordan. The host of the biggest prize giveaways was Colin Murnane. Some of the last Avago presenters were Marc Raphael, James Seager, Jodie McMullen, Steve Walls, Sylvia Viosna, Freya Berry and Paul Metcalfe.

=== List of presenters ===
- Gina Akers
- Caroline Artus
- Carolyn Ashton
- Freya Berry
- Louise Brady
- Georgina Burnett
- Zo Christien
- Alan Ennis
- Beverley French
- Charlotte Gane
- Lawrie Jordan
- Liv Kennard
- Nigel May
- Jodie McMullen
- Paul Metcalfe
- Stevie Morgan
- Colin Murnane
- Georgina Palmer
- Jemish Patel
- Melissa Peachey
- Mark Pell
- Cat Porter
- Marc Raphael
- Mark Ryes
- Sonya Saul
- James Seager
- Syrita Spearring
- Justine van Buren
- Sylvia Viosna
- Steve Walls
