= Ben Baldwin =

British television presenter

Ben Baldwin (born 1979) is a British television presenter, he was one of the main hosts of ITV's Make Your Play. Ben has also presented on ITV Play's This Morning Puzzle Book. He currently works on Endemol Produced Gala TV every Thursday and Friday.

== Early life and education ==
Ben was born in Glasgow, 1975. He graduated from the Central School of Speech and Drama in 1998 with a Bachelor of Arts in Acting.

== Other projects ==
Baldwin was a member of the presentation and development team on Sky's interactive gaming channel Sky Vegas, and reported regularly on the SkyPoker website. He has also been a presenter for corporate training and informational videos for several companies, including TKMaxx, Avid, Unilever, Irn-Bru, Royal Mail and Virgin Mobile. One of the videos he made with TKMaxx, entitled "The Journey of the Jeans" won a certificate in 2007 at the International Film and Video Festival for corporate employee communications.
