= The Daily Quiz! =

British quiz channel and TV programme

Ownership
- Owner: Big Game TV Productions

History
- Launched: 13 March 2006; 19 years ago
- Closed: 25 April 2007; 18 years ago
- Former names: Big Game TV

The Daily Quiz! was a live, phone-in quiz channel, previously a TV programme, which was showing on ITV Play (Freeview channel 35) and also on Men & Motors (Sky Digital channel 131) from 3pm-6pm seven days a week. Two presenters were in the studio simultaneously and took it in turns to answer calls, the second presenter waits by the jackpot board or front desk and is brought in every so often to chat. The Daily Quiz! had a newspaper/gossip theme running throughout the show and at regular intervals, the presenters sat at their desk, related celebrity news stories from the day's papers and discussed them in a light-hearted manner. Viewers could win up to £5000 in the jackpot game.

The Daily Quiz! was part of the ITV Play stable (along with The Mint and Quizmania) and started broadcasting on this channel on 19 April 2006.

One of The Daily Quiz!'s main presenters was Kat Shoob, who is also a presenter on ITV Play's flagship programme, The Mint.

The show was produced by the same production team as Big Game TV.

On 21 April 2006 weather forecaster Michael Fish appeared on The Daily Quiz!, and was the only celebrity guest ever featured on the show.

On 19 May 2006, officers from the Fraud Squad raided the offices of Big Game TV, makers of The Daily Quiz!, after a BBC Radio 4 investigation for the You and Yours programme found that receptionists were told to ignore all incoming calls for long periods of time while 150–200 calls per minute were clocked up at 75p a time. The charges were later dropped by the Crown Prosecution Service.

Due to this raid, the show was removed from the schedules of ITV Play and Men & Motors.

The Daily Quiz! returned as a channel on 16 April 2007, on Big Game TV's channel (Sky channel 849) and broadcasts from 10 p.m.-3 a.m. On 25 April, just nine days after returning, it was announced that "The Daily Quiz is taking a break from broadcasting." This message was then changed to "The Daily Quiz is no longer broadcasting."

== Presenters ==
- Jim Brooman
- Georgina Burnett
- Kylie Cushman
- Matt Cuttle
- Lisa Hanlon
- Tommy Sandhu
- Kat Shoob
- Anoushka Williams

== Games ==
=== The Daily Ladder ===
The show usually started with a ladder game. They consisted of eight blank spaces increasing in value (and difficulty), ranging from anywhere up to £1000. The question was usually either a missing word game. For example, the missing word game could be '_____Ball' (possible answers being 'foot', 'medicine', 'fire' etc. Alternatively, the game could pose a question such as "Name things you see at a wedding".

=== The Daily Bunch ===
This game had eight squares placed around a central title square. The questions posed were similar to the ladder games where players had to think of things associated with a particular place or event. Examples of questions are "Name things associated with Australia" or "Name things you might see at a circus". There were three answers worth £50, three worth £100 and two worth £150. Unlike the ladder games, these cash values were arranged in no particular order and the more obscure answers weren't necessarily the ones that gave the most money.

=== The Daily Kidz ===
This was a basic ladder game but with a slight difference. Not only did it use blackboard themed graphics, school children had been filmed saying the correct answers and cheering, so when a viewer was correct, the appropriate footage was played. The questions were usually children based such as "Boys' names beginning with S" or "Things children do after school".

=== Over-exposed ===
An image of a celebrity was shown on the plasma screen with a filter applied to make them harder to recognise. The viewer must tell the presenter who they think the celebrity is.

=== Jackpot Game ===
This was played at random intervals (when a siren sounds) after right answers were given in the regular games. In the jackpot game, viewers were shown a 7x7 square grid labelled with letters along the X-axis and numbers down the Y-axis, and had to pick co-ordinates to unveil a hidden sum of money. The viewer was guaranteed to win at least an extra £50 on the Jackpot Game. Prizes up for grabs were multiple amounts of £50, £75, £100, £200, one £1000 and also hidden behind one of these squares is £5000. When the £5000 was found, a new jackpot board appeared for the next caller and the game started again. During the first couple of weeks of The Daily Quiz, the jackpot board was 8x8 with more squares to uncover; it was later re-sized to make finding the £5000 easier.

== Added incentives to play ==
- Bonus (additional amount of cash for a limited time; e.g. extra £100)
- Rapid Round (back-to-back calls with no banter)
- 2 For 1 (each caller is allowed two answers)
