= Lisa Marie =

Lisa Marie or Lisa-Marie may refer to:

== People ==
- Lisa Marie (actress) (born 1968), American model and actress
- Lisa-Marie Long, British television presenter and actress
- Lisa Marie Nowak, a United States naval officer and former NASA astronaut
- Lisa Marie Presley (1968–2023), daughter of Elvis Presley
- Lisa Marie Scott (born 1974), American model and actress
- Lisa Marie Varon (born 1971), American professional wrestler
- Lisa-Marie Vizaniari (born 1971), Australian discus thrower
- Lisa-Marie Woods (born 1984), Norwegian football midfielder

== Fictional characters ==
- Lisa Simpson, a fictional character whose full name is Lisa Marie Simpson
