= 2007 British premium-rate phone-in scandal =

Scandal about the use of phone services on radio and TV programmes

The 2007 British premium-rate phone-in scandal, sometimes referred to in the press as simply the phone-in scandal, relates to a series of controversies regarding the use of premium-rate telephone numbers (or PRS) by several British television and radio broadcasters. The first revelations began in February 2007 regarding the Channel 4 television programme Richard & Judy. However, over the following weeks, more allegations emerged regarding misconduct by major British broadcasters, including the BBC, ITV, Channel 4 and Channel 5. The programmes affected included phone-in competitions and public votes conducted over several years, dating back to 2001. As a result, adjudicators Ofcom and ICSTIS (now known as Phone-paid Services Authority) conducted several investigations, resulting in millions of pounds worth of fines and a reform in the use of PRS by broadcasters.

== Background ==
=== Pre-2007 ===
There had been some investigations into the use of PRS in television programmes in the years leading up to 2007. In 2005, Ofcom found two broadcasters to be in breach of their licensing conditions for failure to maintain recordings of quiz programmes following complaints about their handling of competitions. In October 2006, ICSTIS received 2,635 complaints regarding the seventh series of Channel 4's reality television show Big Brother, after Nikki Grahame—who had been evicted (voted out) by paying viewers—was allowed to return to the programme. This controversy led to fines totaling nearly £50,000 for the phone service providers. Between late 2006 and early 2007, Ofcom recorded breaches against broadcasters regarding the fairness of television quiz shows and competitions, including The Wrestling Channel, Channel 4, ITV and Channel 5. In January 2007, Gamecast UK was issued a fine of £100,000 for its broadcast of pre-recorded competitions inviting viewers to call a premium rate number when they had no chance of winning, in addition to other serious code breaches regarding the broadcast of pornographic material and other unauthorised broadcasts. Gamecast's licence was ultimately revoked in April 2007 after failing to pay the fine.

=== February 2007 ===
On 18 February 2007, the Mail on Sunday reported that it had received leaked emails regarding the television programme Richard & Judy, which was broadcast nightly. In each programme, a competition named You Say We Pay ran, in which viewers were invited to call a premium-rate phone number for the chance of being randomly selected to play a game with the presenters. On 14 February 2007 at 5:09 pm, nine minutes into the programme, Eckoh (the telephone service provider) emailed Cactus TV (the production company) a list of 24 potential winners, from which one winner would be chosen. However, ten minutes later, a second message was broadcast inviting viewers to continue to call in, even though nobody calling after Eckoh's email was sent had any chance of being entered. The report also clarified that it had no evidence that the show's presenters, Richard Madeley and Judy Finnigan, had any knowledge of the issues. On 22 February, following Channel 4's admittance that several series of the programme could have been affected and a claim from a contestant that the problems existed in 2002, ICSTIS announced their intention to conduct an inquiry into the programme. On 28 February, Eckoh pulled out of its contract with Cactus TV.

Following the allegations regarding Richard & Judy, ICSTIS began to investigate the BBC's cookery show Saturday Kitchen - also produced by Cactus TV - after it was alleged that nine editions of the programme had invited viewers to call a PRS - also provided by Eckoh - even though the broadcasts were pre-recorded and viewers' calls had no chance of being put through.

On 28 February, it was also reported that ITV had admitted to overcharging viewers via its "red button" voting service during the third series of The X Factor - resulting in £200,000 in extra charges to viewers - and had reported their findings to ICSTIS.

=== March 2007 ===
On 1 March, ICSTIS chairman Sir Alistair Graham invited senior executives of the UK's leading broadcasters to a meeting to discuss the emerging allegations, stating: "My concern is that these problems are resulting in a loss of viewer trust in participation TV and in the premium-rate payment mechanism." On 6 March, ITV suspended all premium-rate telephone services, though certain services resumed on 13 March. Though the BBC and Channel 5 initially stated that they had no plans to suspend PRS, Channel 5 did so on 8 March, reporting that on five occasions, after their programme BrainTeaser had failed to find a winning contestant to their competitions, broadcast fictitious names as "winners", including one incident where a member of the production team posed as a "winner". Channel 4 suspended PRS following revelations of a "glitch" preventing callers from being entered into a competition on the racing programme The Morning Line.

The first radio stations were named in the controversy on 12 March, after Virgin Radio admitted to inviting viewers to call a pre-recorded programme, and LBC being investigated for allegedly not revealing the price of phone calls to listeners.

On 13 March, Eckoh announced that they were referring the scandal to the police, following allegations that it mishandled votes relating to the sixth series of I'm a Celebrity...Get Me Out of Here.

The BBC revealed that two of its children's programmes were affected: Blue Peter had faked a competition winner after a technical fault prevented retrieval of calls; and pre-recorded repeats of Smile had invited viewers to call in when they had no chance of getting through.

Other ITV programmes that were named as being investigated included Soapstar Superstar, Dancing on Ice, Who Wants To Be A Millionaire?, Gameshow Marathon and Ant & Dec's Saturday Night Takeaway.

In March 2007, ITV appointed Deloitte to conduct a "comprehensive review" into the broadcaster's use of PRS in its programming.

=== April 2007 ===
On 23 April, BBC's Panorama broadcast a show which investigated the use of PRS in multiple programmes, including GMTV and its competitions, which Opera Telecom provided.

=== September 2007 ===
The Observer revealed that a crisis meeting had taken place on 26 September by the heads of the BBC, ITV, Channel 4 and Channel 5. Mark Thompson, Michael Grade, Andy Duncan and Jane Lighting were all in attendance to discuss their attempt to "restore public trust in broadcasting".

=== October 2007 ===
The results of the Deloitte review were published in a report on 18 October. Described as "the most comprehensive review carried out into the use of PRS by any UK broadcaster", the report identified "serious or concerning issues in a limited number of ITV programmes". The report stated, regarding the various issues:

ITV has taken specialist legal advice in respect of each of the specific issues set out in this document and is advised that the evidence does not support any allegation of criminal behaviour. ITV has identified and will take appropriate action in relation to each aspect of the findings of the review.

== Investigation ==
Ofcom revealed that they had 23 open investigations against broadcasters, while ICSTIS had a further 15. On 22 March, Ofcom announced its intention to investigate the use of PRS on television, with an inquiry led by Richard Ayre. In a statement, Ofcom's chief executive Ed Richards said:

"Widespread concern about the use of premium rate telephone lines by broadcasters and editorial standards in those programmes has raised serious questions about trust between broadcasters and viewers. Ofcom has been monitoring the issue closely and has launched a number of individual investigations since the start of the year. However it is clear from the number of cases underway that a broader set of issues need to be examined as a matter of priority. This inquiry will seek to establish the root cause of the compliance issues which have emerged over recent weeks, and inform key decisions about protecting consumers."

Though it was reported in October 2007 that the Serious Fraud Office would be investigating the scandal, they later announced that the cases did not "meet the SFO criterion for acceptance for investigation".

Between June 2007 and October 2009, Ofcom published the findings of their investigations into breaches of its Broadcasting Code about the use of PRS. This resulted in over £11 million of fines and statutory sanctions on networks.

In September 2007, ICSTIS found service provider Opera Telecom to be in breach of its code regarding its provision of competitions for GMTV.

=== Methods used and errors made ===
Over several years, broadcasters, service providers, and programme producers breached Ofcom's Broadcasting Code in various ways. Some were foreseeable errors, and others were deliberate interventions to alter results.

==== Fake competition winners ====
One of the most prolific methods used by programmes during this period was using fake winners in competitions. Between 25 July 2005 and 17 March 2007, ten different programmes announced fictitious names and winners of their contests. This included eight BBC programmes, Channel 5's BrainTeaser, and GCap's Secret Sound, which was broadcast on 30 radio stations. Some of the entries to the competition were fabricated by the production team, and, in a few instances, members of the production staff appeared on the programme posing as winners. On one occasion, during the broadcast of Blue Peter, a child visiting the studio was asked by a researcher to pretend to be a competition winner, which they did. This resulted in an additional recorded breach against the BBC for failing to protect the welfare of children.

==== Early finalising and overriding of public votes ====
The 2004 and 2005 National Comedy Awards both featured two pre-recorded half-hour segments inviting viewers to vote for the recipient of the People's Choice Award. In real-time, the award had already been presented on both occasions, but viewers were still asked to vote. During the 2005 awards, a decision was taken to override the public vote for the People's Choice Award. Ant & Dec's Saturday Night Takeaway was named the winner, whereas the show with the highest number of votes was actually The Catherine Tate Show. The reason for the switch has never been identified, though Ofcom investigated two theories. The first theory was that Robbie Williams, who presented the award, would appear on the programme only if he could present it to Ant and Dec; the second theory was that employees of ITV instructed the switch (Takeaway was an ITV show, whereas Catherine Tate was broadcast on BBC One). Ofcom expressed its "[disappointment] at the lack of cooperation it received" from members of the production.

Similar breaches were also recorded against the programme Soapstar Superstar. On 5 January 2007, senior producers finalised the vote two minutes before the lines had closed, while presenter Zoe Ball continued to invite viewers to vote. After the vote closed, the last (11th) placed contestant in the vote was eliminated. However, instead of the 9th and 10th placed contestants being put forward to the overnight vote to evict, the actual results were disregarded. The 7th and 8th placed contestants were put forward for the vote instead. Another aspect of voting for the show involved the public voting for which song they would like the contestants to sing. On at least eight occasions, the production team overrode the vote and decided for themselves which songs the contestants would sing. ITV acknowledged that junior members of staff who objected to these actions were "firmly sat upon" by senior producers. Ofcom opined that the programme-makers "showed their total contempt for ITV1’s audience" in manipulating the votes in this way, and described their behaviour as "absolutely reprehensible".

Ofcom also recorded a breach against ITV relating to the programme I'm A Celebrity, Get Me Out of Here! after it emerged that, on 30 November 2006, voting had closed three and a half minutes early, meaning that over 20,000 votes cast during this period were not counted. On this occasion, however, no statutory sanction was imposed.

==== Unfair selection of competition finalists ====
Ofcom described in their reports several unfair methods used to select competition winners in particular programmes, overriding the "random" selection requirements. These included:

- Early selection - where competition finalists were being selected before the lines had closed, resulting in later callers having no chance of being selected
- Staggered selection - where several shortlists of competition finalists were produced before the lines had closed, resulting in later callers having a lower statistical chance of being selected
- Geographical selection - entrants being unaware that the competition was not being conducted in their area, meaning they stood no chance of winning
- Editorial selection - where winners were chosen based on their "suitability to be on screen", or where staff deliberately selected entrants who had guessed the answer incorrectly, to prolong the competition
- Denying prizes to genuine winners - in the case of The Clare McDonnell Show, some entrants who had guessed the correct answer were refused the prize, as they had already won previous competitions on BBC 6 Music

==== Inclusion of competitions in pre-recorded programmes ====
On several occasions, Ofcom sanctioned broadcasters for broadcasting competitions and other services "as live", whereas the programmes were pre-recorded, and anyone who called to use the services offered had no chance of doing so. These included five editions of Tony Blackburn, eight editions of Dermot O'Leary and 31 broadcasts on ITV2's timeshift service, ITV2+1, broadcast an hour later. Though a breach was recorded against ITV regarding a similar incident during a repeat of People's Court, no sanction was issued.

The BBC were sanctioned for repeating a falsified competition from Blue Peter (see above) on CBBC.

==== Non-inclusion of SMS entrants ====
In the case of Gameshow Marathon, ITV was sanctioned for its "lack of clarity" regarding whether people entering competitions via SMS had been included.

==== Flawed logic competitions ====
In two of ITV2's competitions — The Mint and Glitterball — incorrect answers had been announced as correct. In The Mint, the answer to a wordsearch-style game was announced as "TUNA", despite the grid not containing the letter U. In a Glitterball word-making game, the answer "HATCH" had been derived from the word "ENCHANTED", despite rules stating that letters could only be used once, and only one letter H was available. Though Ofcom recorded breaches, no sanctions were issued.

=== List of breaches recorded by Ofcom ===
Below is a table containing a list of breaches and, where relevant, sanctions imposed by Ofcom, including the broadcaster's name and the programme it related to.

| Broadcaster | Affected programme | Sanction (fine) | Date of finding | Source |
|---|---|---|---|---|
| Channel 5 | Brainteaser | £300,000 | 26 June 2007 | |
| BBC One, CBBC | Blue Peter | £50,000 | 9 July 2007 | |
| GMTV | GMTV | £2,000,000 | 26 September 2007 | |
| Channel 4 | Deal or No Deal | £500,000 | 20 December 2007 | |
| Channel 4 | Richard & Judy | £1,000,000 | 20 December 2007 | |
| Granada | Soapstar Superstar | £1,200,000 | 8 May 2008 | |
| ITV2 | Playalong, The Mint, Make Your Play and Glitterball | £275,000 | 8 May 2008 | |
| LWT | Ant & Dec's Saturday Night Takeaway | £3,000,000 | 8 May 2008 | |
| LWT | Gameshow Marathon | £1,200,000 | 8 May 2008 | |
| LWT | I'm A Celebrity...Get Me Out of Here! | None | 8 May 2008 | |
| ITV | People's Court | None | 8 May 2008 | |
| ITV2 | Playalong, The Mint and Glitterball | None | 8 May 2008 | |
| GCap Media | One Network | £1,110,000 | 27 June 2008 | |
| BBC 6 Music | Russell Brand | £17,500 | 30 July 2008 | |
| BBC One | Children In Need 2005 | £35,000 | 30 July 2008 | |
| BBC One | Comic Relief 2007 | £45,000 | 30 July 2008 | |
| BBC 6 Music | The Liz Kershaw Show | £115,000 | 30 July 2008 | |
| BBC Two, CBBC | TMi | £50,000 | 30 July 2008 | |
| BBC 6 Music | The Clare McDonnell Show | £17,500 | 30 July 2008 | |
| BBC One | Sport Relief 2006 | £45,000 | 30 July 2008 | |
| BBC Radio 1 | The Jo Whiley Show | £75,000 | 30 July 2008 | |
| BBC London 94.9FM | Tony Blackburn | £25,000 | 8 December 2008 | |
| BBC Radio 2 | Dermot O'Leary | £70,000 | 8 December 2008 | |
| Channel TV | British Comedy Awards 2004, British Comedy Awards 2005 | £80,000 | 2 October 2009 | |

== Aftermath ==
=== Presenters ===
Richard Madeley and Judy Finnigan, presenters of the first identified problematic programme, apologised to their viewers on their programme while denying any knowledge of wrongdoing on their programme. Finnigan stated: "Richard and I knew nothing about this until late on Friday afternoon - we were very shocked and also angry on your behalf. We're very sorry."

After the Deloitte report was published in October 2007, Ant and Dec, who presented two of the affected programmes, expressed "disappointment" at the findings of the investigations, making it clear that they had "no idea" that compliance failures were occurring. This was seconded by director of ITV Michael Grade, describing the pair's credits as executive producers as "kind of a vanity credit". Ant and Dec confirmed in a statement that any profits from the next series of Saturday Night Takeaway would be donated to charity. Later, in May 2008, they stated that they would be returning their wrongfully awarded British Comedy Award from 2005. Catherine Tate, whose comedy sketch show was the rightful winner, explained on an episode of The Graham Norton Show that she had finally received her award, and joked about confronting Declan Donnelly in a supermarket.

=== Ofcom ===
As a result of the scandal and the subsequent investigations and sanctions that followed, Ofcom announced its intention to raise the maximum fine that they could impose on ITV and its regional networks, stating that the current guidelines did not "provide sufficient incentives for the licensees to maintain broadcasting standards for the protection of members of the public from the inclusion of offensive and harmful material".

=== Further incidents ===
In December 2020, Ofcom found ITV to be in breach of the Broadcasting Code and their competition licensing conditions. ITV made Ofcom aware that, following mandatory third-party verification of its competitions, 40,000 postal entries into six competitions between 2016 and 2019 had failed to be included. Postal entries are free to enter (excluding delivery costs). Ofcom opined that: "ITV failed to properly implement and execute procedures that are fundamental to ensuring compliance with rules regarding the operation of its broadcast competitions and the relevant licence conditions." On this occasion, no sanction was imposed.
