= Glitterball =

- Starring: Several presenters
- Country of origin: United Kingdom

Production
- Running time: Various

Original release
- Network: ITV, ITV2
- Release: 19 February – 30 September 2007

Glitterball is a live, late night, interactive television quiz show in the United Kingdom. It was broadcast under the ITV Play branding on ITV a few nights a week from around midnight (usually), and from 1.00 a.m. on ITV2. The show launched on 19 February 2007. Both Glitterball and Make Your Play alternated their days of broadcast. Glitterball's final show broadcast on the morning of Sunday 30 September 2007.

== Overview ==
Glitterball was created by Ludus:ETV (who also produced The Mint) and produced from studios at 3SixtyMedia, Manchester. The programme was broadcast on ITV and ITV2 from Sunday to Wednesdays.

The show started on 19 February 2007. In order to win money, holidays and various other special prizes, viewers are required to either call in at a cost of 75p from a BT landline, text the word 'BALL' to an automated call back service or enter via the ITV website. If successful, they would be placed on hold and then transferred live to the studio to deliver their answer.

An announcement on 12 September 2007 confirmed that the show, along with similar late night phone-ins, would be phased out by the end of 2007.

=== The Starlight Theatre ===
Similar to The Mint, presenters refer the studio set as "The Starlight Theatre" and if a caller wins, they are transferred to "The Box Office" to claim the cash prize. The Starlight Theatre was originally an attraction at the now-defunct Granada Studios Tour in Manchester, and is now a production space as part of 3sixtymedia, the facilities company co-owned by ITV and BBC Resources.

The studio was also used to produce sister programme Make Your Play.

== Presenters ==
- Kéllé Bryan
- Zoe Hardman
- Alex Kramer - formerly a presenter on Make Your Play and Quiz Call.
- Katy Pullinger
- Craig Stevens - formerly a presenter of The Mint.

Like The Mint, Glitterball was presented by two presenters at a time. Later on in the show, the presenters' screen times were split up.

Guest Presenters

- Yolly Koppel
- Charlie McArdle
- Russ Spencer

== Games ==
Most of the Glitterball's games were shown on a big screen in the studio, rather than on the viewers television screen at home.

=== Glitterword ===
This game started off with a long word, called the "Glitterword". The viewers had to then make a three or more letter word from the letters in the "Glitterword". For example, the word for the first show was "Thrilling", so the word "ring" can be made. There were a total of eleven possible winning answers per game, ten which could win callers normally £500 or £1,000 (but can vary), and one word called the "Glitterword" which, if guessed, potentially won the callers either thousands of pounds, or free holidays. if the "Glitterword" was guessed, the game ended.

=== Picture Perfect ===
The viewers were shown pictures of five celebrities which were numbered from one to five, and the callers had to sort them out in order of youngest to oldest and just say the numbers.

=== Crossword ===
This was a 3D crossword setup in the studio, and a copy was also shown on the big studio screen. Callers had to guess the words in the crossword, answers were all based on a theme. To make the answer appear on the 3D crossword, the presenter had to flip each letter over. A "Winner Board" was also on the screen on the studio, to show who had won, and their winnings.

=== Spellcheque ===
The game had six lines of letters in total. Callers were given two letters on the top line, they then had to add another given letter to this first line, to create a three letter word. They were then given another letter to add to the previous line, to create a four letter word, and so on, until a seven letter word was made.

Example (from 1st show):

Start Word: AT
Clue: E - TEA
Clue: S - EAST
Clue: D - DATES
Clue: L - TALES
Clue: E - SEDATE
Clue: They will then reveal another clue letter here to make a new word.
