= Beautiful Kitchens =

British interior design magazine

- Cover of one issue of Beautiful Kitchens Magazine
- Editor: Helen Stone
- Categories: Interior design
- Frequency: Monthly
- Circulation: 18,102 (ABC Jan - Dec 2016); Print and digital editions.
- Publisher: Time Inc. (UK) Ltd.
- First issue: 1999
- Country: United Kingdom
- Language: English
- Website: Beautiful Kitchens

Beautiful Kitchens is a monthly interior design magazine about kitchens published by IPC Media. It is edited by Helen Stone.

== Early history ==
The magazine was launched in 1999 as bi-monthly 25 Beautiful Kitchens, its original editor was John Smigielski. Ysanne Brooks became editor in September 2004 when Smigielski was promoted to the parent publication, 25 Beautiful Homes.

The name of the magazine was shortened to just Beautiful Kitchens in February 2008.
