= Big Game TV =

British phone-in quiz television channel

Ownership
- Owner: Big Game TV Productions

History
- Launched: 13 May 2005; 20 years ago
- Closed: 15 April 2007; 18 years ago

Big Game TV (stylised as BIG Game TV!) was a live phone-in quiz channel that was broadcast via Sky Broadcasting in 2005. It released a spin-off, The Hallmark Channel Quiz on 6 March 2006, which was shown on The Hallmark Channel. The show used only three of the presenters.

Big Game TV Productions added The Daily Quiz! on 13 March 2006. This show aired on ITV Play and on Men & Motors seven days a week and featured a selection of Big Game TV's presenters. ITV ended their involvement with Big Game TV due to fraud allegations in May 2006.

== Controversy ==
Big Game TV was the subject of a City of London Police investigation brought by the BBC Radio 4 programme You and Yours in May 2006 over allegations that receptionists were told to ignore all incoming calls for long periods of time while 150-200 calls per minute were charged 75p each. The channel was later called before a parliamentary committee.

NTL removed the channel from their channel line-up on 7 June. The channel closed down entirely after leaving Sky in early 2007, after some bad press for the call-TV industry.

== Presenters ==
- Jim Brooman
- Georgina Burnett
- Matt Cuttle
- Natasha Powell
- Keith Price
- Tommy Sandhu
- Kat Shoob

== Voiceover ==
- Mitch Johnson (announcer)
