= Itouch =

itouch may refer to:

- A Logitech keyboard series released in approximately 1998
- The parent Company of Ostrich Media, a provider of interactive television services
- The Pasen iTouch, a touchscreen Portable media player
- An unofficial nickname for the Apple iPod Touch
