= Liz Fuller =

Welsh television presenter and model

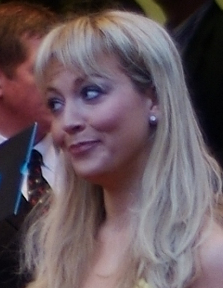
- Born: Elizabeth Angela Fuller; 30 December 1975 (age 50); Swansea, Wales

Elizabeth Angela Fuller (born 30 December 1975) is a Welsh actress, model and beauty pageant titleholder known for being Miss Great Britain 1996–1997. Fuller is the former owner of the Miss Great Britain pageant from September 2009 to January 2011. She launched her own competition of the Miss British Empire beauty pageant in 2011. She married ex snowboarding superstar Phil Clarke in May 2024 at a reception at Hensol castle, South Wales .

== Early life ==
Fuller was born in Swansea, Wales and attended Hendrefoilan Primary School, Dumbarton House School, and Olchfa School.

She attended the Dubensky stage school, where performances included being a child dance star for Eleanor Live (HTV Wales), and in Joseph and the Amazing Technicolor Dreamcoat. Fuller moved to The Grand Theatre School of Dance, and continued taking part in stage productions, including The Hobbit. She was also a model on the S4C programme Heno.

Fuller gained nine GCSEs and three A-Levels. In 1994 Fuller started at the University of Wales Cardiff on the BA journalism, film and broadcasting, from where she graduated in 1997.

== Career ==
=== Modelling ===
Fuller's modelling career started at 16 after being spotted by a photographer, and she undertook catwalk shows and photographic shoots, and also her very first beauty pageant Miss Wales 1994.

After being crowned Miss Cardiff in 1996, she subsequently won Miss Wales GB and the Miss Great Britain International title in 1996. Fuller co-developed Miss British Empire. Launched in April 2011, it was a continuation of previous Miss GB feeder title Miss British Model. With a goal to pass on opportunities in show business to the next generation Fuller oversaw a UK team who run regional heats.

In 1997, Fuller moved to London, and became a commercial model, with campaigns including Kronenbourg, Fosters, Sol beer, Doritos and Rachel Elbaz perfume Dream; and TV adverts include Boots Number 7 make-up, Suzuki and Pearl Drops toothpaste. Fuller was also house model on the Richard and Judy show This Morning.

Since 1998 Fuller has hosted Miss Great Britain, and in 2005 she bought the UK licence to produce and operate the show. After 18 months Liz was bought out of the business.

=== TV and broadcasting ===
Fuller started her broadcast career at Morriston Hospital, Swansea presenting on one of the few hospital television channels in the country. After stints at Swansea Sound Radio and HTV Wales, Fuller got her TV break presenting MUTV, on the show Reds at Five with Ally Begg. She then worked in Scotland on the Peakviewing travel reports for a broadband venture, then presented and took on the role as producer on the Dating Channel.

In September 2001, Fuller was offered a presenting role to launch Auction World.tv on Sky Digital, and in August 2002 Fuller became the female host for ITV1's The Pop Factory on HTV Wales with Steve Jones, which later led to her presenting Record of the Year on ITV.

In 2004, Fuller wrote, sold, presented and produced the car show Numberplate Heaven on Sky Channel Men and Motors. Fuller also joined Nation 217 as one of their anchor presenters on Sky. Fuller was an anchor presenter on Quiz Call for Channel Five from 2005 to 2007, and then a judge on ASBO Teen to Beauty Queen. Fuller had a column in Wales on Sunday called The Fuller Picture.

=== Acting ===
In 2011, Fuller relocated to Los Angeles, California, to develop her acting career. Fuller has had parts in films including: A Winter Rose, Our Way and 7 Faces of Jack the Ripper

== Personal life ==
Fuller's past relationships include Paul McKenna, and Mark Shipman, the millionaire boyfriend of Nicola Horlick. She dated former fiancé Mr California Kagan Yalaman from May 2012 to August 2014.

Fuller is an ambassador for Cancer Research UK, Shelter Cymru and NCH, and is also linked with the Asharan Orphanage. Fuller ran Race For Life 2008 for Cancer Research, having previously linked the charity to Miss Great Britain.
