= Zoe Hardman =

British television presenter and actress (born 1982)

- Hardman in 2026
- Born: Zoe Kristi Hardman; 16 November 1982 (age 43); Kent, England, UK
- Occupations: Television presenter, actress
- Spouse: Paul Doran-Jones
- Children: 2

Zoe Kristina Hardman (born 16 November 1982) is a British radio and television presenter. She first appeared on TV in Channel 4's reality game show Playing It Straight in 2005.

== Career ==
Hardman was born in Kent, England. She was a presenter on ITV's phone-in quiz show Glitterball. She is heavily involved in the Entertainment and Fashion show weekly for the online entertainment syndication company ReelKandi TV. She also continues to do commercials, acting and voiceover work. In 2011, Zoe was the showbiz news reporter for an on-line channel (T5M) and also spent time filming at The Ashes (Cricket) series for the ECB. Hardman was one of the main presenters on the Nuts TV channel on Friday and Saturday nights.

In January 2012, she began hosting Take Me Out: The Gossip on ITV2 alongside Mark Wright, until the show was rested in 2014. She did not return to the show when it was revived in 2015. She also appeared as MC at the Boodles tennis tournament at Stoke Park in Buckinghamshire.

In June 2015, Zoe started hosting her own late night radio show across the Heart network from 10pm-1am, later switching to Sunday afternoons in August 2016. By January 2020, Hardman was the host of Heart Weekend Breakfast, covering Saturday afternoons and Sunday mid-mornings following the departure of presenter Sian Welby. Since 2023, she hosts Sundays from 9am-12pm.

Zoe always steps in to cover for Amanda Holden on Heart Breakfast when she’s off. She presents Made by Mammas: The Podcast alongside Georgia Dayton.

== Personal life ==
On 25 April 2016, Hardman announced that she was expecting her first child with her rugby player boyfriend, Paul Doran-Jones. Their daughter, Luna, was born on 19 September 2016. A further son, Kit, was born on 28 April 2018.

She spoke about going through the menopause aged just 34.

== Television credits ==
- Joseph and the Amazing Technicolor Dreamcoat (1999)
- Quiznation
- Richard & Judy
- Health & Beauty
- The Big Gay Out
- Music Zone Special
- Playing It Straight (2005)
- No Bananas (2005)
- Used Car Roadshow (2005)
- Sport Relief (2006)
- Playdate (2006)
- Glitterball (19 February, March–August 2007)
- Nuts TV (14 September 2007 – 2014)
- After You've Gone (2008)
- My Life as an Animal (2009)
- Take Me Out - The Gossip (2011–2013)
- This Morning's Hub (2012–2013)
- Morning Live (BBC1, 2025)
