= Quiz Call =

- Country: United Kingdom
- Headquarters: Teddington Studios

Programming
- Picture format: 16:9

Ownership
- Owner: Ostrich Media

History
- Launched: August 2005; 21 years ago
- Closed: 1 January 2007; 19 years ago

Availability

Terrestrial
- Freeview: Channel 32

Quiz Call
- Created by: 9Live
- Based on: 9Live (Germany)
- Country of origin: United Kingdom

Production
- Production company: Ostrich Media

Original release
- Network: Quiz Call (2005-2007); Five (2006-2009); Ftn (2006-2007); Five US / Five USA (2007-2009); Five Life (2007-2009)
- Release: August 2005 – September 12, 2009

Quiz Call was a TV quiz channel. It was broadcast in the United Kingdom and owned by Ostrich Media. It was also a late night / early morning phone-in quiz TV show, produced by Ostrich Media and broadcast on Five, Five US / Five USA, Five Life and Ftn.

== History ==
=== Launch ===
In November 2004, E4 aired a British version of the German phone-in quiz show 9Live during its post hours for six weeks as part of a trial Channel 4 held with the show's owners. After the trial proved a success, Channel 4 announced in June 2005 that its commercial subsidiary 4Ventures Limited would launch its own participation television channel by the end of the year. The channel launched in August 2005 as Quiz Call, and was available on Freeview and NTL platforms, and launched on the Sky Digital platform shortly afterwards. The show encourages viewers to enter by calling a premium-rate telephone number or for free via their website to compete in quizzes and win cash prizes. By October, the channel had moved to Freeview channel 37.

On 22 April 2006, Quiz Call began airing overnight on Five, allowing analogue terrestrial television viewers to participate in the show. The show recrived a slight revamp with a graphics revamp and a purple/gold set in June, which was mainly used on Five. On 6 August, a new car was offered up as a prize. On 1 September, the channel celebrated its first birthday with a 41 Hour Marathon Live Broadcast, giving viewers the chance to play for a jackpot of £100,000 by guessing a 4-digit combination.

=== Sale and physical channel closure ===
On 19 October 2006, Channel 4 announced the sale of Ostrich Media to iTouch Media. The sale included the rights to the program, the physical TV channel, and its slots on NTL and Sky, as well as the company's back room technology, including its customer relations management capability. The sale was closed on 3 November. The sale did not include its Freeview slot, which was retained by Channel 4 and was soon used to broadcast Film4 +1 and subsequently Channel 4 +1. With its removal from Freeview, Quiz Call's schedule was reduced to airing from 19:00-1:00 instead of 12:00-3:00 like before. For a brief period, Quiz Call also broadcast on Ftn, between 22:00 and 1:00 during the Christmas season of 2006.

On 1 January 2007, the physical Quiz Call channel ceased operations on Sky and NTL/Telewest. The channel's slot initially showcased a caption that stated that the service would be back in Mid-January, but was shortly replaced with a test card reading that the service has ceased operations. The channel was removed from both platforms shortly afterward. The show returned later that month under a new deal with Five, which would see the show broadcast on Five, Five US and Five Life on most days of the week. This arrangement saw Five, which had trialled a run of Quiz Call before switching to The Great Big British Quiz in 2006 – drop TGBBQ and revert to using Quiz Call as their late-night quiz provider.

On a number of occasions in 2008, Quiz Call aired on Five US because of live sport being shown on Five.

=== Removal of the show ===
On Thursday 10 September, presenter Liz Fuller announced that Quiz Call would end on Five on 12 September 2009 after 3 years on Five. The decision to end Quiz Call came after Five signed a deal with NetPlay TV to broadcast Live Roulette on Five three nights a week; these broadcasts, which were made possible due to the relaxation of the rules regarding such broadcasts on UK terrestrial TV, replaced Quiz Call in the schedule.

After the show ended, the official Quiz Call website stated that the show intended to return at an unspecified point in the future. The show never returned in any form, and the show's website was taken offline in Mid-2010.

== Show format ==
A grid or table of money amounts is shown on screen. Behind each amount lies an answer to the main question. The main question is normally given in a clue word with associated answer. For example, Films 'M', Black____ or Things That Are Red. A possible 10 – 18 answers are available with numerous outcomes but only the answers on the grid/table are correct. The top prize answers worth £1,000, £2,000 and £3,000 were generally difficult but not totally unheard of (such as Marge Simpson's necklace, The headlights on the 'KITT' car from Knight Rider or the seats in the House of Lords – other answers were easier and would be fairly well known such as 'a postbox'). The host will take calls at random for callers to answer the question, and if it corresponds to an answer on the grid/table they will win a cash prize shown that is available. Around halfway through the show, when the presenters swap, the cash considerably drops. for example, the top answer that was worth £3,000 drops down to around £500-£750, and the smallest answer of around £100-£250, drops to around £25-£50.

Various situations will happen during the show as to how much is available, such as double, triple, 4×, 5×, 6×, 7×, 8×, 9× and even 10× the money, extra answers, instant wins or jackpot amounts.

Since the show's relaunch on Five, it was revealed on 8 August 2009 that they had given away over £8 million in prizes and £650,000 had been given away in 2009, and on 27 August 2009, it was revealed £710,000 had been given away to 1930 winners so far in 2009.

== Controversy ==
On 24 September 2006, Quiz Call admitted to The Sunday Times that they had manipulated games by blocking callers from taking part for periods of up to 40 minutes. Under headlines of "naked profiteering", Quiz Call said that on these occasions, it charged thousands of callers a standard 75p premium line fee – knowing that it would give them no chance to answer the prize question. At the culture, media and sport committee, held on 28 November 2006, representatives from Quiz Call admitted that one instance of people being put on hold did occur and that the producer responsible no longer works for Ostrich Media.

Quiz Call, which once offered a £100,000 jackpot, admitted that the show's producer was responsible for deciding how long callers had to wait to enter the games. It admitted that Quiz Call had been caught out cutting corners, in using its own staff to pose as prize winners, clutching 3-foot cheques in an on-air promotion, though there was no suggestion that any employees had been playing or winning the games.

The BBC Radio 4 programme You and Yours broadcast a segment on Quiz Call on 10 October 2006, who were contacted by listeners who had been barred by the channel. One listener, Mari Hamilton from Aylesbury, who used the on-air name 'Luna', contacted the programme to say that she was blocked by the channel after winning a number of cash prizes using the free web entry option.

Quiz Call was removed from TV screens as part of Five's review into all its premium rate phone calling quiz programmes in March 2007, and returned on the evening of 30 March 2007.

At least one independent individual has estimated Ostrich Media to be drawing more than £23,000 per hour of the show being on air, or around £100,000 per evening based on the new legal requirement to show the number of calls received in any particular minute.

== Quiz Call presenters ==
Presenters who have hosted the show include:

- Kait Borsay
- James Callow
- Zö Christien
- Nikki Cowan
- Suzanne Cowie
- Kirsty Duffy
- Alan Ennis
- Anna Fowler
- Ruth Frances
- Liz Fuller
- Derek Gibbons
- Paul Hendy
- Chris Hopkins
- Steve Hyland
- Lawrie Jordan
- Debbie King
- Alex Kramer
- Vicky Letch
- Kay Little
- Carol Machin
- Sean Macintosh
- Mike Mason
- Lottie Mayor
- Charlie McArdle
- Chris Park
- Abi Pethullis
- Cat Porter
- Keith Price
- Craig Rowe
- Mark Rumble
- Gemma Scott
- Russ Spencer
- Liz Summers
- Carmel Thomas
- Dan Warren
- Pollyanna Woodward

For the last week of the show, 4 of the 7 presenters who were working for Quiz Call at the time presented. The three that did not present were Russ Spencer, Pollyanna Woodward and Keith Price. The presenters for the last three shows were as follows:

- Thursday – Liz Fuller and Kait Borsay
- Friday – Chris Hopkins and Chris Park
- Saturday (the final show) – Liz Fuller and Chris Park
