= Jenny Powell =

English radio and television presenter (born 1968)

- Born: 8 April 1968 (age 58); Ilford, London, England
- Occupations: Radio and television presenter
- Years active: 1986–present
- Spouse: Toby Baxendell (m. 2006; div. 2009)
- Children: 2

Jenny Powell (born 8 April 1968) is an English radio and television presenter. After appearing on No Limits, she went on to present series such as Wheel of Fortune, UP2U, Gimme 5, Live Talk, Wordplay and Daybreak.

== Early life ==
Jenny Powell was born on 8 April 1968 in Ilford, England. Powell's parents are of Cape Coloured descent from South Africa. She attended Woodford County High School for Girls in Woodford Green and the Italia Conti Academy of Theatre Arts in London.

== Career ==
Powell began her career in 1985 as the ad voiceover for the 6th and 7th volumes of the Now That's What I Call Music! series. In 1986, she went on to present the BBC2 music series No Limits and then moved to Saturday morning television for children, first co-presenting UP2U for BBC1 during the summers of 1988 and 1989, then Gimme 5, on ITV. She was also a presenter of Top of the Pops in 1989. In 1995, she became the hostess on ITV's version of Wheel of Fortune.

In 1997, Powell appeared on Channel 4's Brass Eye, a satirical spoof documentary series produced by Chris Morris. Powell has also presented Soap Fever, Live Talk, Getaway and Our House for UKTV Style. She then presented a stand-up series titled Stand Up Jenny, and was a regular on ITV's Loose Women. In 2005, she was one of the competitors in the ITV reality series Celebrity Wrestling, competing under the name The Avenger.

Powell provided the voiceover for ITV fly on the wall documentary Love 2 Shop, based at The Trafford Centre, in 2003. She was a presenter on BBC One's To Buy or Not to Buy, and presented on ITV's Bingo Night Live in June 2008. From 23 March 2009, she presented a quiz show, Wordplay on Five in the old Going for Gold slots. In 2010, Powell was a contestant on Channel 4's Celebrity Come Dine with Me and BBC One's Celebrity Masterchef. In 2012 and 2013, she appeared in two episodes of ITV2's Lemon La Vida Loca. In 2017, she joined ITV's Bigheads as a commentator. In January 2018, Powell participated in And They're Off! in aid of Sport Relief. She also participated with her daughter Pollyanna on the fifth series of Big Star's Little Star where they won £12,000 for charity. In January 2019, she took part in the quiz series Celebrity Catchphrase, alongside Ade Edmondson and Jason Manford. In April 2019, she appeared on the 5Star series Celebs on the Ranch, set in Arizona, a spin-off from Celebs on the Farm.

In 2021, Powell started presenting the weekend breakfast show on Greatest Hits Radio. On 26 November 2022, Powell co-hosted the Royal Television Society North West Awards alongside Adam Thomas.

== Personal life ==
In 2006, Powell married Toby Baxendell and they had two daughters. However, as of 2009, Powell had separated from her husband and was living with her daughters in Cheshire.
