= Ronan McKenna =

British-based television presenter

Ronan McKenna is a British-based television presenter known as the presenter of the game show Quiz TV and a host of The Great Big British Quiz.

== Biography ==
Kenna was born in Ireland. He hosted the game show Quiz TV. In 2006, he was hosting The Great Big British Quiz as of 9 June 2006.
