= Only Fools on Horses =

BBC reality television programme

Only Fools on Horses was a BBC reality television programme produced by Endemol UK. The show's name was a play on that of the sitcom Only Fools and Horses, and first aired on 7 July 2006. It featured twelve celebrities who performed equestrian events, with one celebrity being eliminated every day until only one was left. Proceeds went towards Sport Relief. It was presented by Angus Deayton and Kirsty Gallacher.

After the final, it was announced that the event had raised over £250,000 for Sport Relief. The final, a jump off between Jenni and Nicki, was won by Jenni Falconer.

== Celebrities ==
In reverse order of elimination:

1. Jenni Falconer (Television presenter)
2. Nicki Chapman (Television presenter) (Replacement for Duncan Bannatyne, who dropped out due to injury)
3. Matt Baker (Former Blue Peter presenter)
4. Sara Cox (Radio 1 DJ)
5. Diarmuid Gavin (Gardener)
6. Anna Ryder-Richardson (Interior designer and presenter – Changing Rooms)
7. Suzi Perry (Television presenter)
8. Paul Nicholas (Actor and producer)
9. Sally Gunnell (Former athlete)
10. Ruby Wax (Comedian)
11. Matt Littler (Actor- Hollyoaks)
12. Josie d'Arby (Actress and television presenter) (Replacement for Felix Dexter)

== Horses ==
- Fibi (Matt Littler) – mare, 16.1 hands, 13 years old.
- Funtime (Paul Nicholas) – gelding, 16.1 hands, 12 years old.
- Indy (Suzi Perry) – mare, 15 hands, 9 years old.
- Isa (Diarmuid Gavin) – mare, 16.3 hands, 8 years old.
- J-Lo (Jenni Falconer) – mare, 16 hands, 8 years old.
- Leroy (Josie D'Arby) – gelding, 16.1 hands, 10 years old.
- Marley (Nicki Chapman) – mare, 16.1 hands, 9 years old.
- Mr Kenneth (Ruby Wax) – gelding, 16 hands, 16 years old.
- Peter (Matt Baker) – gelding, 16.2 hands, 9 years old.
- Prelude (Anna Ryder-Richardson) – mare, 16.1 hands, 8 years old.
- Ralph (Sally Gunnell) – gelding, 16.3 hands, 9 years old.
- Solomon (Sara Cox) – gelding, 16.2 hands, 11 years old.

== Judges ==
- Jessica Kürten – The world number three female show-jumper
- Jodie Kidd – Supermodel, polo player and horse rider
- Robert Smith (equestrian)

== Trainers ==
- Tim Stockdale
- Fredrik Bergendorff
- Mia Korenika (now Palles-Clark)
- Mary-Ann Trevor-Roper
- Jenny Ward
