= Paul Doran-Jones =

England international rugby union player

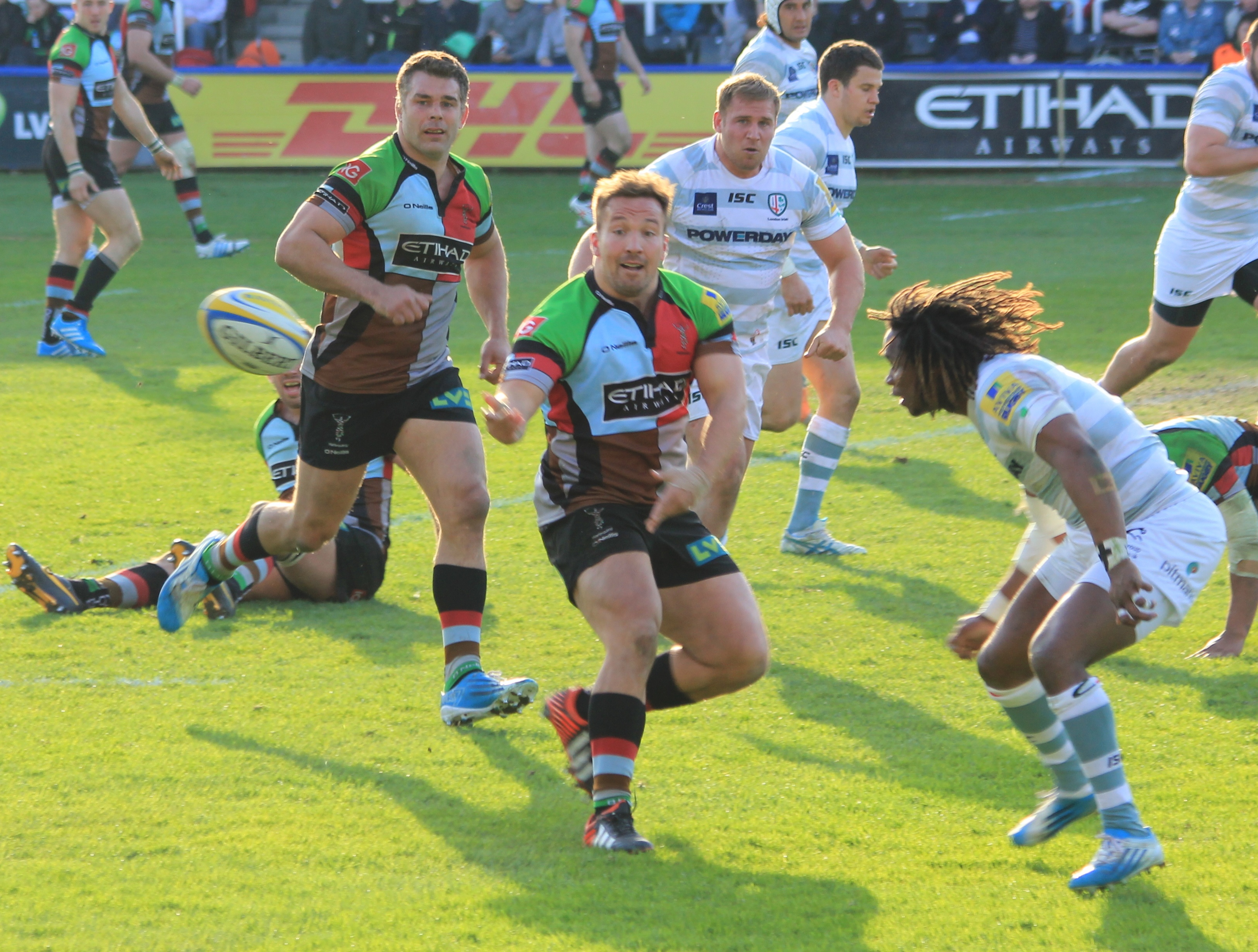
- Doran-Jones playing at the 2013-14 English Premiership, Harlequins vs London Irish
- Born: Paul Doran-Jones; 2 May 1985 (age 41) Enfield, County Meath, Ireland
- Height: 1.88 m (6 ft 2 in)
- Weight: 121 kg (19 st 1 lb)
- School: Old Swinford Hospital; Wellington College
- University: Trinity College Dublin

Rugby union career
- Position: Prop
Youth career
- -: Lansdowne
- –: Kings Country
Senior career
| Years | Team | Apps | (Points) |
| 2003–2007 | Leinster | 0 | (0) |
| 2007–2009 | London Welsh | 39 | (15) |
| 2008 | Wasps | 0 | (0) |
| 2009–2011 | Gloucester | 49 | (5) |
| 2011–2013 | Northampton Saints | 40 | (0) |
| 2013–2015 | Harlequins | 19 | (0) |
| 2015–2017 | Gloucester | 21 | (0) |
| 2017–2018 | Wasps | 3 | (0) |
International career
| Years | Team | Apps | (Points) |
| 2009 | England Saxons | | |
| 2009-2013 | England | 6 | (0) |

Paul Doran-Jones (born 2 May 1985) is an Irish born English retired rugby union player. He most recently played in the English Premiership for Wasps. He played as a prop.

== Club career ==
Capable of playing both sides of the scrum, Doran-Jones' career started at Lansdowne in Dublin whilst he was at university in the city.

He had a spell with King Country in New Zealand and four seasons with Leinster from 2003 to 2007. He then joined London Welsh, representing them during the 2007–08 season and 2008–09 season. He was also a part of the London Wasps side in their Guinness A League triumph in 2008.

Doran-Jones joined Gloucester Rugby for the 2009–10 season. But, after two seasons at the club, it was announced that he will join Northampton Saints at the end of the 2010–11 season.

On 29 January 2013, he left Northampton Saints to join Harlequins on a two-year contract from the 2013–14 season.

On 28 January 2015, it was announced that Doran Jones would rejoin Gloucester Rugby for the 2015–16 season. On 19 June 2017, Doran-Jones announced his return to Premiership rivals Wasps from the 2017–18 season.

== International career ==
Doran Jones had represented England at U18 level, and represented the Ireland U19 team at the 2004 Junior World Cup in South Africa. He later represented Ireland U21s at the 2006 IRB U21 World Championship. He qualified to represent Ireland through his mother.

On 9 November 2009, Doran-Jones was called up to the England Squad for the Autumn Internationals following injury to Dave Wilson. He made his England debut on 14 November 2009 at Twickenham against Argentina as a substitute for Tim Payne.

== Personal life ==
Doran-Jones was educated at Wellington College. He was suspended from Wellington College for producing a non-consensual film showing him having sex with his then girlfriend in school accommodation using a hidden camera. No police charges were brought against Doran-Jones. Fellow pupil and future England rugby teammate James Haskell was also suspended by the school for his involvement in the film's distribution.

He is married to presenter Zoe Hardman.
