= Nuts TV =

Programming
- Timeshift service: Nuts TV +1 – also shutdown

Ownership
- Owner: Turner Broadcasting System Europe (Time Warner Inc.)

History
- Launched: 12 September 2007
- Closed: 15 January 2009

Nuts TV was a British television channel related to Nuts magazine. Nuts TV began broadcasting on Freeview channel 42 on 12 September 2007 nightly from 9pm to 1am, and launched on Sky Digital on 21 January 2008 until its closure on 14 January 2009. A 1-hour timeshift channel, Nuts TV +1 launched on 20 October 2008.

Nuts TV was launched by the magazine's owner IPC Media and Turner Broadcasting, which are both parts of the Time Warner media empire. The service was produced by the ETV media group, with advertising sales handled by Turner.

On 28 October 2008, Turner Broadcasting announced that Nuts TV was to be taken off Freeview in early 2009 and replaced with CNN International, but will carry on as an internet channel. It is also announced that Nuts TV was to be taken off Sky Digital in January 2009 along with Nuts TV +1. Nuts TV was closed down at 3 am on 14 January 2009 and an internet version of the channel was available online until the magazine's closure in April 2014, when all the company's properties were terminated.

== Production ==
Most of the content for the channel was produced in-house in their purpose-built studio. A spokesperson for Nuts TV commented that the channel was looking for some third party ideas to expand its schedule, however as the channel was closed down this never came to light.

== Content ==
=== Premised Format ===
Prior to launch, information was released to the press about the channel's content; "The channel's programming will feature a live format reflecting Nuts' brand of "unique and fast-paced humour". Nuts TV will take the magazine into the TV arena with exclusive original content within a live studio setting" according to a joint statement made by Turner and IPC. "Cameras will be placed all over the set such as the corridors and production offices to allow the producers to show action from behind the scenes. The programming will be live, five nights a week, with hosted highlights for the remaining two. This live format is suited to the Nuts audience, who are familiar with the pace, variety and immediacy of the web".

"Whilst Nuts TV will have all the character and personality of the magazine, it will not replicate it, and will offer its own unique take on girls, sport, entertainment, gadgets, cars and news. Much of the show will involve viewers as the new channel seeks to include as much user-generated content as possible such as phone ins, the ability to send in content such as mobilephone videos and text messages. The first part of participation already involves the chance for viewers to become guest presenters".

Since launch, Turner and IPC have followed their proposed format. Nuts TV has live content from Tuesday until Saturday. Sunday and Monday are 'Best Of' days, where the best of the week's highlights are shown.

To encourage viewers to keep watching, a "pub ammo" question is asked before the commercial break, with the answer being revealed at the end. The questions are general knowledge and trivia based; the idea being the questions could be asked in a pub quiz.

However, in 11 April issue of Nuts magazine, on page 20 it was announced that Nuts TV would no longer feature live studio content.

=== Shows ===
- Rude News – a nightly news bulletin
- WKD Shed Sports Show – presented by Geoff Norcott.
- North vs South – A game show hosted by O.J. Borg pitting the North versus the South
- Will Beauty Call? – a show which features where three men fight for the chance to give their phone number to Miss England, Miss Liverpool and Miss Glasgow
- Book at Bedtime with Lucy Pinder – Lucy Pinder reads stories by authors such as H. G. Wells and Shakespeare
- Overexposed – Lucy Pinder gives advice on photographing your own glamour shoot
- Fit and Fearless – a show which features three fit women spending the night in haunted locations.
- Football Hurts – a fly-on-the-wall documentary which follows Ryman Premier League side AFC Wimbledon.

== Presenters ==
The initial presenters were:

- Dan Wright – Co-hosted Fri/Sat nights with Steve Marsh and Zoe Hardman
- Steve Marsh – Co-hosted Fri/Sat nights with Dan Wright and Zoe Hardman
- Zoe Hardman – Co-hosted Fri/Sat nights with Dan Wright and Steve Marsh
- Lynsey Horn – Co-hosted Tues/Wed/Thurs nights with O.J. Borg
- O.J. Borg – Co hosted Tues/Wed/Thurs nights with Lynsey Horn
- Geoff Norcott – Presented Shed Sports 1 with Comedy Dave
- Dave Vitty (Comedy Dave) – Presented Shed Sports 1 with Geoff Norcott
- Karl Howman – Voiceover work and links – with Dan Wright and Stephen Marsh

Since Nuts TV started, some guest hosts appeared. These included:

- Lucy Pinder – presented regularly on Thursdays from 10pm-midnight
- Chanelle Hayes

== Ratings ==
Initial ratings were described as "inauspicious", with a first night average of 9,000 viewers (0.10% share), with a peak of 28,000 upon launch.

== See also ==
- Nuts (magazine)
- lad mag
