= Jenni Falconer =

Scottish radio and television presenter

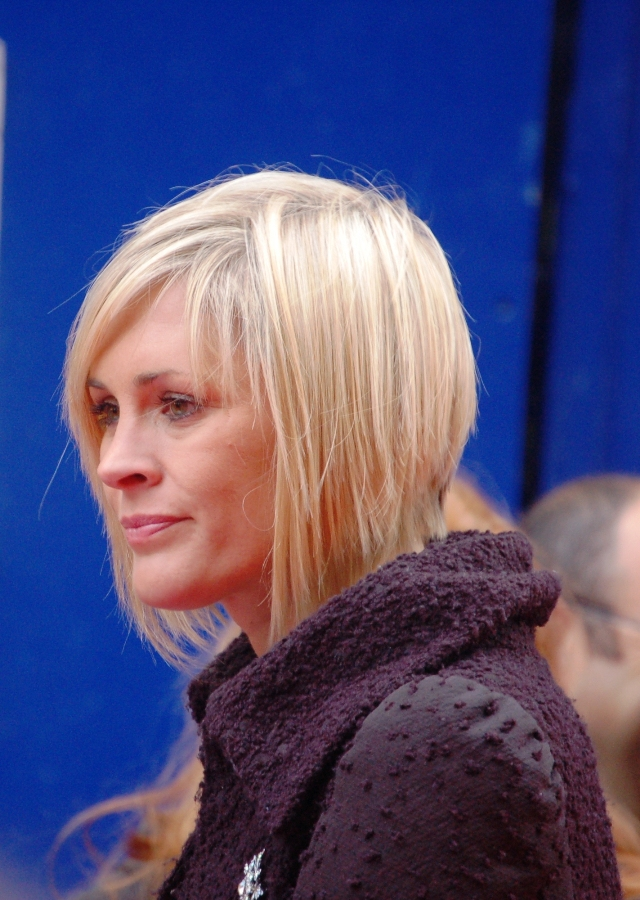
- Falconer at the 2008 BAFTA Television Awards
- Born: 12 February 1976 (age 50); Glasgow, Scotland
- Occupation: Broadcaster
- Employer(s): ITV, Smooth Radio
- Television: Entertainment Today; The National Lottery Draws; This Morning
- Height: 5 ft 8 in (1.73 m)
- Spouse: James Midgley (m. 2010)
- Children: 1

Jenni Falconer (born 12 February 1976) is a Scottish radio and television presenter. She appears on the ITV daytime show This Morning as a regular travel reporter and was a regular presenter of the National Lottery Draws on BBC One. Falconer was also a radio presenter on Heart FM until December 2019, and since 2020 has been host for Smooth London breakfast and Saturday mid-mornings.

== Early life ==
Falconer spent her early years in Bishopbriggs and Milngavie, two towns on the northern outskirts of Glasgow. She has a younger brother. After her family relocated to Berkshire when she was seven, she was educated at the independent Abbey School in Reading and attended the University of Leeds in 1994 to study Spanish and Italian with minors in Latin, Geography and Management Studies. Whilst studying at university, she also launched her television career. She was offered a contract by ITV to make a documentary and a consumer show on the proviso that she left her studies.

== Career ==
=== Television ===
Falconer made her television debut in 1994 as a contestant on Blind Date, and later presented BBC Scotland's Big Country, ITV's documentary series 3D and consumer show We Can Work It Out alongside Judy Finnigan and Jane Harvey. She hosted travel shows, Holiday and How to Holiday. She was the main co-host of Entertainment Today from its launch in 2000 until its end in July 2008 on GMTV.

Falconer's other work includes reporting on I'm a Celebrity... Get Me Out of Here! in Australia for GMTV in 2003, 2004 and 2006, hosting The National Lottery Draws in September 2006 and hosting Cirque de Celebrité in October 2007. She also worked on a show about 24 for Sky1 24 in 24.

In 2006, Falconer won the Sport Relief showjumping competition Only Fools on Horses riding an 8-year old 16 hands mare called J-Lo.

She hosted three series of Fantasy Homes By the Sea.

In 2009, Falconer was the host of the daytime quiz show Wordplay on Channel 5 (previously called Brainteaser).

Between 17 and 21 August 2009, Falconer was a guest presenter on STV's The Hour, with main anchor Stephen Jardine.

Falconer works as a travel reporter for This Morning. She also guest presented the show during Holly Willoughby's maternity leave from May to July 2011, sharing duties with Ruth Langsford and returned in 2013.

In January 2013, Falconer participated in the first series of the ITV's diving show Splash!, but was voted off by the judges. In August 2015, Falconer guest presented five episodes of Lorraine, standing in for regular host Lorraine Kelly.

=== Radio ===
On 14 March 2013, Global Radio announced that Falconer would join Heart to host the Sunday morning show from 6 am to 8 am, replacing Jason Donovan who took a break from the network to tour in the musical Priscilla: Queen of the Desert.

In June 2019, her early breakfast show was extended 4–6:30am due to Heart Breakfast (usually 6am-10am) becoming national with the new Scheduled of 6.30am-10am. As a result, she decided to step down from her Sunday show.

In December 2019, It was announced that Falconer had decided to leave Heart and would be replaced on her Early Breakfast slot by James Stewart. In January 2020, it was announced that Falconer would be the new host for Smooth London breakfast and hosting on Saturday mid-mornings, the latter being broadcast across the UK.

In February 2025, it was announced that Falconer would be the presenter of the new national Smooth Breakfast show broadcast across England and Wales on FM, AM, digital radio and online.

=== Other work ===
In June 2009, Falconer was unveiled as the face and body of Adore Moi underwear range by Ultimo.

Falconer has also posed for photographs in Arena Magazine and FHM. In 2016, she starred in the Very television advertisements.

In March 2019 Falconer, a dedicated runner, announced the launch of her new podcast, RunPod, in which she meets celebrities and former sports stars who also love running for pleasure.

In July 2020 Falconer became the new running coach in the Start 2 Run app.

Her book, Runner's High, is scheduled to be published by Orion Spring on 14 March 2024.

== Business ventures ==
In 2019, Falconer co-founded Kollo Health, a UK-based health and wellness brand which launched in 2020. The brand is best known for its premium liquid marine collagen supplements, delivering 10,000mg of marine collagen per daily sachet, alongside a range of health and wellness products suitable for both men and women. Kollo Health has won numerous industry awards including the Global Excellence Awards 2025 for Best Marine Collagen Supplement Brand UK.

== Personal life ==
On 11 August 2009, Falconer announced on Twitter that she had become engaged to her long-term partner, actor James Midgley after he proposed in New York City. They married at Babington House on 3 June 2010. Falconer birth to their daughter on 21 September 2011. She has lived in Wimbledon, London, since 2001.

== Charitable causes ==
Since 2002, Falconer has been a celebrity patron of the charity Breast Cancer 2000. In 2012, Falconer took part in the London Marathon, raising money for CLIC Sargent. She finished with a time of 3 hours and 53 minutes. In the following two years, Falconer took part in the London Marathon, where she raised money for The Children's Trust a charity for children with brain injury and neurodisability. In 2014, she completed the marathon in 3 hours and 57 minutes. Falconer took part in the 2015 London Marathon, raising money for Cancer Research UK. In January 2019 Falconer became an Ambassador of The Children's Trust, having been a supporter since 2009. She has run three marathons for the charity in 2009, 2014 and 2019 and hosted gala fundraising events in London.

== Filmography ==
Television

| Year | Title | Role | Channel | Notes |
|---|---|---|---|---|
| 1995 | The Big Country | Presenter | BBC Scotland | |
| 1998–1999 | We Can Work It Out | Co-presenter | | |
| 2000–2008 | Entertainment Today | Co-presenter | ITV | Part of GMTV |
| 2004 | How to Holiday | Co-presenter | ITV | |
| 2006–2015 | The National Lottery Draws | Presenter | BBC One | In-rotation |
| 2006 | Only Fools on Horses | Competitor | BBC One | Comic Relief show |
| 2009 | Wordplay | Presenter | Channel 5 | 1 series |
| 2009 | The Hour | Guest presenter | STV | 5 episodes |
| 2009–2010 | Something for the Weekend | Guest presenter | BBC Two | |
| 2011–2018 | This Morning | Various roles | ITV | |
| 2013 | Splash! | Contestant | ITV | Series 1 |
| 2013–? | Fantasy Homes by the Sea | Presenter | Really | |
| 2015 | Lorraine | Guest presenter | ITV | 5 episodes |
| 2026 | The Martin Lewis Money Show | Guest presenter | ITV | 1 episode |

Guest appearances

- Blind Date (1994)
- Never Mind the Buzzcocks (2001, 2006)
- Celebrities Under Pressure (2004)
- The Paul O'Grady Show (2005, 2007)
- Hider in the House (2007)
- All Star Family Fortunes (2007)
- School's Out (2007)
- Alan Carr's Celebrity Ding Dong (2008)
- Daily Cooks Challenge (2008)
- All Star Mr & Mrs (2010)
- Countdown (2010)
- Ten Mile Menu (2010)
- The Cube Celebrity Special (2010)
- Live with Gabby (2012)
- What's Cooking? (2013)
- The Chase: Celebrity Special (2013)
- Sport Relief's Top Dog (2014)
- Tipping Point: Lucky Stars (2014)
- Celebrity Antiques Road Trip (2016)
- Pointless Celebrities (2016)
- The Saturday Show (2016)
- Celebrity Ninja Warrior (2017/2018)
- James Martin's Saturday Morning (2021)
- The Chase Celebrity Christmas Special (2021)
- The Weakest Link (2022)
