= Anthony Crank =

British television presenter

- Born: Anthony Scott Crank; 13 April 1974 (age 52); Manchester, England
- Other name: Cranky

Anthony Scott Crank (born 13 April 1974) is an English television presenter, journalist and actor, probably best known for his work on Channel 4's T4, MTV and Bingo Night Live on ITV1, and BBC1's Holiday.

== Education ==
Crank trained at the Oldham Theatre Workshop.

== Career ==
Crank moved to London aged 23 and found work writing for magazines, Mizz!, more! and ultimately becoming a celebrity editor for OK!. Crank was headhunted for Channel 4 youth strand T4 and has also presented on MTV. He was one of several presenters on BBC Holiday, Holiday Hit Squad and Departure Lounge and hosted a range of shows for the Eat Cinema channel as well as working as the main presenter on ITV's Bingo Night Live. He also worked for BBC Radio Manchester as a regular cover presenter.

Crank returned to Manchester in the late 00's to pursue an acting career. He was cast as Bill, a policeman in the sixth series of Shameless. and made his theatre debut in Chris Hoyle's critically acclaimed play, 'The Newspaper Boy', opposite Suranne Jones and Joan Kempson. He also took on the role of bad boy Levi in Hollyoaks E4 spin-off 'The Morning After The Night Before, and is soon to be seen as one of the central roles as debt collector 'Jimmy' in Simon Powell's Salford based feature film 'Poor, Wee Me', opposite Paul Hurstfield, Michelle Holmes, Tim Booth, Ian Mercer and Suranne Jones. He then featured in Hollyoaks again in 2010 as Steve, an arrogant TV Producer making a 'T4' style documentary with the characters Duncan and Theresa. He has also just played a small role as a policeman in Jimmy McGovern's new BBC drama, The Accused.

In 2022, Crank was cast as layabout and scoundrel Dean Turnbull in Coronation Street and has reprised the role numerous times.
