= Gimme 5 (TV series) =

- Genre: Children's
- Presented by: Jenny Powell; Lewis MacLeod (1992); Matthew Davies; Nobby the Sheep; Paul Leyshon (1993–4)
- Country of origin: United Kingdom
- Original language: English
- No. of series: 3
- No. of episodes: 41

Production
- Production company: Tyne Tees Television

Original release
- Network: ITV
- Release: 25 April 1992 – 27 August 1994

Gimme 5 is a children's television programme that broadcast on Saturday mornings on ITV from 25 April 1992 to 27 August 1994. The programme was a live two-hour show which included live guests, cartoons, competitions, and games. For series 1, the show was presented by Jenny Powell, Lewis MacLeod, Matthew Davies, and Nobby the Sheep. For series 2, Paul Leyshon joined the Gimme 5 presenting team taking over from Lewis MacLeod. The programme was produced for three series by Tyne Tees Television from Studio 5, at their City Road studios.

== Transmissions ==
Series	Start date	End date	Episodes
1	25 April 1992	27 June 1992	10
2	8 May 1993	28 August 1993	14
3	7 May 1994	27 August 1994	17
