= Wordplay (British game show) =

- Also known as: Wordplay Extra
- Genre: Game show
- Directed by: Derek Hallworth
- Presented by: Jenny Powell; Jenni Falconer
- Composer: Music 4
- Country of origin: United Kingdom
- Original language: English
- No. of series: 1
- No. of episodes: 95

Production
- Running time: 50 minutes (including adverts)
- Production companies: Lucky Day; Group M Productions / Motion Content Group

Original release
- Network: Channel 5
- Release: 23 March – 31 July 2009

Wordplay is a game show presented by Jenny Powell and sometimes Jenni Falconer. It aired live weekdays from 23 March to 31 July 2009 on Channel 5 and was axed after only one series.

== Format ==
Four contestants competed through six rounds of word puzzles. The lowest scorer at the end of every second round was eliminated. If one of these rounds ended with a tie for low score, a tiebreaker puzzle was played; a correct answer allowed the contestant to advance, while a miss eliminated them. Scores were reset to zero after each elimination.

=== Main game ===
During each of the first five rounds, the contestants were given a category that hinted at the solution of the puzzle and had to buzz-in before responding. An incorrect answer froze the contestant out of the next puzzle. Each of these rounds continued until time was called.

- Word Jumble: Unscramble a set of letters to form a word or phrase (1 point each).
- A.K.A.: Figure out a word or term based on an alternative description of it (2 points each).
- Word Smuggle: Find a word hidden as consecutive letters within a phrase (1 point each).
- Hangman: Guess a phrase as the letters are gradually filled in (2 points each).
- Invisible Link: Find a common word that can be placed before or after each of three given words to create new words or phrases (1 point each).
- Word Ladder: Given a starting three-letter word, change or add one letter at a time as instructed by the host to create a new one fitting the given category (2 points each). Both contestants played this round separately and had 60 seconds to make as many changes as possible.

=== Final: Safe Cracker ===
The high scorer after the Word Ladder round had a chance to win a cash jackpot by finding the correct seven-digit combination to a safe that held a cheque. They had 90 seconds to solve one puzzle of each of the six types used in the main game, and could play them in any order. Passing was allowed, but the puzzle did not change if the contestant returned to it later. Each correct answer was worth £50. The Word Ladder puzzle required the contestant to make only one change to the given word.

The combination used each of the digits 1 through 7 once. Every solved puzzle filled in the digit that corresponded to it (1 through 6, in the order that the rounds were played in the main game). If the contestant solved all six puzzles, the 7 was placed in the only still-empty slot and they won the jackpot automatically in addition to the £300 for the puzzles. If not, they had one chance to fill in the missing digits and open the safe. The jackpot began at £1,000 and increased by £500 per day until it was won.

== See also ==
- BrainTeaser
- Going for Gold
