= The Great Big British Quiz =

TV channel

Ownership
- Owner: Play to Win TV

History
- Launched: 20 June 2005
- Closed: 4 May 2007

The Great Big British Quiz (TGBBQ) was an interactive quiz based channel on which viewers where invited to phone in to solve puzzles in return for cash and prizes. It broadcast from studios in Battersea, London, England, and it was usually seen on Sky Digital. Its mascot was a dog called Jack who barked each time a caller was selected and put through to the studio. TGBBQ was live every day and broadcast hours varied, from 9:00 am to 1:00 am in its heyday, to 20:00 pm until 4:00 am as the quiz TV boom came to an end. The channel at one time produced and presented shows for Five and Sci Fi Channel. The show was seen on channel 824 on Sky Digital and channel 770 on NTL. On 4 May 2007, TGBBQ ceased operating due to Play To Win TV entering liquidation.

== Presenters ==
- Russ Spencer
- Dan Warren
- Derek Gibbons
- Lisa-Marie Long
- Carole Machin
- Anna Fowler
- Alex Kramer
- Sara Damergi
- Pollyanna Woodward
- Sharon Clancy
- Yiolanda Koppel
- Lesley Collier
- Zoe French
- Rebecca Walsh
- Carryl Varley
- Liam Dolan
- Ronan McKenna
- Abi Griffiths
- Abby Surgeon
- Tim Fornana
- Beverley French
- Sarah Hendy
- Ashley House

== Sci-Fi Quiz Zone ==
The Sci-Fi Quiz Zone was a separate programme but still went under the name of The Great Big British Quiz, being referred to as TGBBQ's production. It was based in the same studio as The Great Big British Quiz but used different effects and games. The music was the same and there was still Jack the dog as the mascot. It was broadcast at different times, usually starting between 12:50 am and 1:40 am, and always ending at 4:00 am, on the same channel as TGBBQ as well as the Sci-Fi Channel.
