= Zoe French =

British model and television presenter

Zoe French (born 4 May 1986) is a British model and television presenter. She started her presenting career on Bikini Beach which she presented until October 2005.

She went on to present Quiznation, and other mainly interactive gameshows including regular hosting duties on Live Roulette TV and (more recently) The Great Big British Quiz.

After her modeling and television career she began to work in sponsorship sales for various conference companies.
