= Craig Stevens (presenter) =

British television presenter

Craig Stevens is a English radio and TV presenter. He appeared in the 2022 Netflix musical drama I Used to Be Famous.

== Biography ==
His first presenting job was on Brainteaser. , Stevens presented ITV shows The Mint and Glitterball. He has hosted his own radio shows on former East of England dance station Kiss FM (now Kiss 105-108) and former Essex & Suffolk local station SGR-FM, and used to be a presenter on Heart Cambridgeshire and Star Radio in Cambridgeshire. He spent some time presenting for ITV and is an anchor host for Sky Cinema interviewing film stars including Jim Carrey, Kristen Stewart, Steve Carell, Justin Bieber, and Jodie Foster.

Stevens has appearedITV's This Morning.

In 2016, he became a showbiz presenter on Channel 5's live Saturday morning magazine programme The Saturday Show and occasionally appears on ITV's Weekend. That year, he also presented When Gameshows Go Horribly Wrong on Channel 5. Stevens has also been a contributor on Channel 5's Most Shocking Celebrity Moments.

He is a regular host on the red carpet at London film premieres. Stevens has presented from the BAFTA red carpet, regular presenter on Ideal World, Hosted The Lost City Premiere as well as interviews for Into The Spider-Verse and more.
