= YooPlay Games =

Ownership
- Owner: YooMedia

History
- Closed: 18 July 2006
- Replaced by: YooPlay TV

Availability At time of closure

Terrestrial
- Freeview: Channel 106

YooPlay Games was a TV interactive service which featured gambling and betting games.

The channel was available on Freeview channel 106 and the Sky Digital Interactive menu.

On Sky YooPlay Games was replaced by YooPlay TV (channel 850).

== YooPlay on Freeview ==
The channel officially launched on Freeview channel 53 (multiplex D) on 23 May 2003 as Free2Play, with all the games on the channel available to play free of charge. However, later that year the channel introduced paid-for content games, which the player had to phone a premium rate number to gain access to the channel, hence the channel's later re-branding to F2P Games. On 27 May 2004, F2P dropped the brand completely following developer MieTV's acquisition by YooMedia in December the previous year, aligning with its sister channel on Sky Digital, YooPlay Games (formerly GoPlay TV).

In late 2005 the service switched to multiplex C. At around this time, YooMedia decided to lease certain hours of the channel's bandwidth to other broadcasters, namely overnight EPG services (presently tvtv DIGITAL), and reduced the output on the YooPlay Games channel significantly. The games channel was closed entirely on 18 July 2006, when YooMedia leased its remaining capacity to SMG plc's Virgin Radio (broadcasting on Freeview channel 727). YooMedia's EPG-service contract remains in place.
