= ITV Play =

British TV channel (2006–07)

- Country: United Kingdom
- Broadcast area: Nationwide

Programming
- Language: English

Ownership
- Owner: ITV plc

History
- Launched: 19 April 2006; 20 years ago
- Closed: 5 March 2007; 19 years ago
- Replaced by: ITV2 +1 (on Freeview)

Links
- Website: ITV Play at the Wayback Machine (archived 16 October 2006)

Availability (at time of closure)

Terrestrial
- Freeview: Channel 31

ITV Play was a British free-to-air television channel devoted exclusively to phone-in quiz show programmes. It was owned by ITV plc, and expanded upon ITV1 and ITV2's late-night quiz programmes such as Quizmania and The Mint. ITV Play was launched on 19 April 2006—replacing Men & Motors on Freeview—and started broadcasting on the Sky platform on 24 July 2006.

The channel was short-lived; its programmes, along with those carried by other British television channels, faced scrutiny for their semblance to gambling. Concurrently, a series of scandals also emerged surrounding the use of premium-rate telephone numbers on British television. On 5 March 2007, ITV announced that it would audit its use of premium-rate lines across its programming, resulting in the closure of ITV Play until further notice; on 13 March, ITV announced that ITV Play would be closed permanently. The ITV Play name continued as a strand on ITV1 during the overnight hours until December 2007.

== Criticisms ==
Callers were charged 75p for each call they made for a chance of involvement in shows, regardless if they had been connected to the studio or not. ITV had promised to make its programmes with higher production values than quiz programmes on other quiz channels, but provided little evidence of such. Many of the callers were kept on hold and unable to connect.

Restrictions were put on the number of attempts to call, 150 per day, meaning that in a 24-hour period, BT callers could still spend a maximum of £112.50 per day. This changed in February 2007 to 100 calls per day, so the maximum was £75 a day on BT.

In January 2007, Ofcom found ITV guilty of breaching its broadcasting code for making answers to one of its quizzes too obscure. Viewers complained after two answers to the question "what items might be found in a woman's handbag?" were revealed to be "balaclava" and "rawlplugs". The 21 September 2006 quiz was found to be in breach of the rule that "competitions should be conducted fairly". Ofcom warned ITV Play that there must be no further incident. Ofcom stated that this was the first formal breach of the code recorded against ITV Play. For its part, ITV Play described it as a "one-off" incident of poor judgement.

The genre of interactive quiz TV shows has also been heavily criticised by the Culture, Media and Sport Committee. They stated that call TV programmes "generally look and feel like gambling", have "a lack of fairness and transparency" and that they encourage people to call more times than they can afford. Had ITV Play been classed as a gambling channel, it would have been forced to give 20% of its profits to good causes.

Labour MP Paul Farrelly went further in his criticism of channels in the participation quiz TV genre, describing them as "tantamount to theft."

== Suspension and closure ==
On 5 March 2007, ITV announced that all premium rate phone competitions and quizzes, including the ITV Play channel, would be suspended while an audit took place. Programmes ended in the early hours of 6 March 2007.

The audit was announced after a number of problems with premium rate services affecting ITV, BBC One and Channel 4, all of whom were to meet with the regulator ICSTIS. ITV appointed Deloitte as independent auditors.

On 13 March 2007, ITV announced that the ITV Play channel would permanently cease transmission following the recent concerns over participation television.

On 16 March 2007, the channel finally closed and was removed from the Sky EPG. The channel slot was replaced by ITV2 +1 on Freeview.

== Shows ==
All of the shows below were shown on the ITV Play channel. Quizmania is the only one that has been revived since the demise of ITV Play.

=== Quizmania ===
Quizmania, was presented by Greg Scott, Debbie King, Lee Baldry and others and was produced by FremantleMedia. It was the first phone-in quiz show produced for ITV. The success of this show was one of the main reasons ITV started ITV Play. The last episode was broadcast on 14 January 2007. The series returned on 17 July 2008 as an online-only programme, co-produced by ScreenPop Ltd. and Illumina Digital.

=== The Call ===
The Call, presented by Tim Dixon, Dave O'Reilly, Zö Christien and Emma Lee, had a feature called the Phrase that Pays and a winner could be made simply by answering saying "ITV is the Place to Play" and not anything else. It ended on 22 December 2006. The series was produced by ITV Productions (Granada) in Manchester.

=== The Common Room ===
The Common Room aired for half an hour in the early evenings. The Common Room's main presenters were Tim Dixon, Emma Lee and Zö Christien. It launched on ITV Play on 31 July. Unlike the rest of the ITV Play games, this was more of a chat show with minor prizes. The show aired for its last time on 10 November 2006. The series was produced by ITV Productions (Granada) in Manchester.

=== The Daily Quiz! ===
The Daily Quiz!, presented by Kat Shoob, launched on 13 March 2006 and was produced by Big Game TV Productions. On 19 May 2006, officers from the Fraud Squad raided the offices of Big Game TV, makers of The Daily Quiz! after a BBC Radio 4 investigation for the You and Yours programme found that receptionists were told to ignore all incoming calls for long periods of time while 150–200 calls per minute were clocked up at 75p a time.

=== The Debbie King Show ===
The Debbie King Show was a magazine-style quiz show shown on the 10pm – 12:30am slot on ITV Play. It began on 5 March 2007 and ended on 6 March 2007, lasting only for one show due to ITV Play being taken off the air the day after the show was launched. The programme was produced by Hamma & Glamma Productions.

=== The Mint ===
The Mint was a quiz show featuring celebrity guests in a large Mansion-like set. A £100,000 Jackpot was given away twice. The show was presented by Brian Dowling, Kat Shoob, Craig Stevens, Cat Porter, Beverley French and Mark Rumble and co-produced by Ludus and E:TV. The Mint in which over £6 million was given away, finished on 14 February 2007.

=== The Mint Extra ===
The Mint Extra was a spin-off from the main show The Mint. The presenters included Milo McCabe, Brian Dowling, Craig Stevens, Mark Rumble and Cat Porter.

=== Playalong ===
ITV Playalong was a presenter-less text-in game show that was usually shown as a filler during most of the day.

=== Play DJ ===
Play DJ was a text-in quiz show which was similar to ITV Playalong, except with hosts and a studio instead of a "static" screen. Presenters of the show included Nigel Mitchell, Ruth Frances, Amy Garcia, Emma Lee, Mark Ryes, Tim Dixon and Greg Scott. It ended on 6 March 2007. Two Way TV produced the series.

=== Playdate ===
Playdate was a dating programme. The programme began exclusively on ITV2 late at night, but later had a slot on ITV Play in an early evening slot. The show's presenters included Brendan Courtney, Dave O'Reilly and Kate Lawler. It ended on 17 December 2006. It was produced by Hamma & Glamma Productions.

=== Rovers Return Quiz ===
The Rovers Return Quiz was a Coronation Street inspired pub quiz, based on the fictional public house, presented by Rachel Bullen (Roberts). The Rovers Return Quiz aired for the last time on 13 October 2006. It was replaced by an extended version of This Morning Puzzlebook. The series was produced by ITV Productions (Granada) in Manchester.

=== The School Run ===
The School Run aired everyday between in the early evening (and on Mondays at 9pm) it was hosted by either Tim Dixon, Emma Lee or Lawrie Jordon until 30 July 2006. It was replaced with The Common Room. The series was produced by ITV Productions (Granada) in Manchester.

=== This Morning Puzzlebook ===
This Morning Puzzlebook was a quiz show with large cash prizes first broadcast on ITV Play, then later as part of the daytime magazine programme This Morning. Presenters included Zö Christien, Tim Dixon, Emma Lee, Dave O'Reilly, Allison Hammond and Ben Baldwin. It aired for the last time on 22 December 2006. The series was produced by ITV Productions (Granada) in Manchester.

=== Make Your Play ===
Make Your Play was the first in-house ITV Production to go out on the main ITV channels. The show started off at weekends on ITV, with shows airing on the ITV Play channel the rest of the week. The show had larger cash prizes than most other ITV Play shows, as a result calls were put through to the studio on a much less regular basis.

In the later end of its run the show was broadcast seven nights a week on ITV Play and ITV. The series was produced by ITV Productions (Granada) in Manchester.

Make Your Play was also the last ITV Play show to be broadcast before the brand was ditched by ITV. However it was announced that ITV Play would not be returning in 2008.

=== The Zone ===
The Zone was only on air for six programmes. It was an interactive gameshow that began on 26 February 2007, on ITV Play and Men & Motors in the 3pm – 6pm TV slot. Presenters included Anna Fowler and Dave O'Riley. The show ended on 6 March 2007. The series was produced by ITV Productions (Granada) in Manchester. The show was generally a Make Your Play clone, with a different colour theme and lower cash prizes.

=== Glitterball ===
Glitterball was introduced as a replacement for The Mint. The show was broadcast by the same company that produced The Mint, and featured one of the show's main presenters. Unlike other ITV Play shows, the games were shown on a giant screen in the studio rather than by graphics on the viewers own screens. The show also had a double presenter format, usually male and female.

The show also survived the Ofcom investigation into ITV Play, after a few nights break they returned to ITV and ITV Play at the same time, with some callers saying, ' It's good to have you back.'

=== Glitterball Extra ===
Glitterball Extra, much like The Mint Extra, was shown on the ITV Play channel earlier in the evening, prior to the main shows broadcast. Due to bad publicity from the Ofcom investigation, call volumes dropped, so the show was ditched after seven episodes.

=== Other programmes ===
In addition to its slate of quiz programmes, the channel also aired delayed repeats of both Love Island and I'm a Celebrity...Get Me Out of Here!.

== See also ==
- 2007 British premium-rate phone-in scandal
