= Gala TV =

Ownership
- Owner: Gala Coral Group

History
- Launched: 4 October 2006
- Replaced: Avago

Links
- Website: Gala TV Website

Gala TV was a bingo channel in the United Kingdom, launched in 2006 by Gala Bingo. The channel was removed from the satellite lineup in 2011. It continued as an online television channel, and in 2012 was renamed as Gala Live.

Gala TV broadcast 24 hours a day. AutoBingo ran throughout the day. Then live bingo ran from 5 pm to 1 am. Viewers could register on the website or by using a freephone telephone number. Players then used the website to purchase tickets for, and play, the bingo games.

== History ==
The channel launched on 4 October 2006, replacing Avago. The channel was due to be launched on 13 September 2006 but it was held back by technical problems.

When Gala TV first launched, it was produced by Endemol West and the live studio was located in Bristol with the automated service playout based at Wapping Studios in London. At the time, Gala TV had a very classic approach to the channel. They had a team of five presenters and seven callers. The studio was real and had a cold and classic feel and there was also no interaction with the viewers. Also most of the presenting was done by one presenter. At this point Gala TV broadcast live from 5 pm to 1 am.

In February 2007, Gala TV underwent a massive rebrand. The graphics, idents and adverts were completely changed. The studio also went a change with the new bingo display screen. The presenting style also changed with three presenters and two callers on each night meaning there could be two presenters in each hour. There was much more presenter and viewer interaction. The new Automated Service featuring a prerecorded caller was still being built, so the older automated service was run for a few more months. It eventually launched in July. On Friday and Saturdays in September and October, Gala TV moved their live hours to 5.30 pm to 1.30 am as a trial to see if the upcoming new hours would work.

The next change came in November 2007. A new game was introduced to the live schedule called the "Ultimate Flyer". This meant that there were now nine games in each hour. The presenting style also changed back to a slight more serious approach with some hours being led by only one presenter. Also Gala TV moved their live hours to 6 pm to 2 am after a successful trial in previous months.

In February 2008, another change to the studio took place. Two bubble lamps appeared either side of the screen. These have been removed as they constantly stopped working. These were replaced originally with two white tubes with backlights however after a month they were replaced with two tubes filled with bingo balls.

In June 2008, Gala TV and Gala Bingo launched the Live TV Bingo room where players could view the show live on their PCs as well as playing along with the games. Also players can chat with other players and also chat with the presenters and callers in the studio. Also around this time all the adverts and idents were remade in 3D and using a green screen effect on many of the adverts.

On Monday 1 December 2008, Gala TV's daytime schedule underwent a massive change. Gala TV launched a new roulette product to be broadcast at several times throughout the day. Also Gala Casino's Poker Tour was broadcast twice during the daytime. The whole series was run through twice. In January this was removed from the daytime schedule due to poor viewing figures with more people opting to play bingo.

Sunday 1 February 2009 saw the biggest change to date with a new production company ETV Productions taking over from Endemol. The live studio moved to Battersea Studios in London with the set being a mix of real and virtual with a significantly improved level of presentation. Each night there are two presenters and two callers. There is now much more interaction with the viewer by the use of player walls and maps. The virtual set was dark with a sunset scene in the background. The virtual graphics solution was provided by RT Software. All of the adverts were refreshed as well with some being made by professional companies and presenters.

On Tuesday 2 March 2009, Gala TV went online 24 hours a day. Due to this all Gala Casino related programs were scrapped in order for non-stop 24-hour bingo. Gala Roulette only lasted three months.

In June 2009, Gala TV started broadcasting on High Street TV to advertise the channel lower down on the sky platform. The show broadcasts in widescreen from 11 pm to 7 am daily. This only lasted three weeks as High Street TV broadcast other shopping TV promotions on the channel.

On Monday 4 January 2010, after a number of requests by Gala TV players, the live show was moved back to 5 pm to 1 am, meaning that players could enjoy live bingo one hour earlier. Another reason for the move was the number of people playing originally in the 1 am hour was low.

Since Friday 1 April 2011, Gala TV has only been available via GalaBingo.com and no longer broadcasts on Sky channel 861. On the same date, Gala TV was given a full revamp of its virtual studio and the show itself had more emphasis on the community aspect rather than the bingo.

In July 2012, another revamp to the show took place. Since Gala TV hasn't actually broadcast on TV, the show was renamed Gala Live and the automated bingo part of the channel was scrapped. A reduction of the presenting team also took place as now callers are not featured on the show and presenters spend the majority of the time socialising with the community chat room.
