= Lisa-Marie Long =

British television presenter and actress

Lisa-Marie Long is a British television presenter and actress best known for hosting poker formats for Sky Poker and Matchroom Sport for BskyB, Channel 5 and Sky Sports. She is also a regular poker player and played in the celebrity heat of the Partypoker.net women's world series. As an actress Lisa-Marie has appeared in numerous commercials and television shows and more recently as 'Ellie' in new British feature film The Hike.

== Career ==
Her television career started at Bid TV where her witty comebacks and bubbly personality caught the eye of bosses at Overseas Property TV where she was soon co-anchoring a weekly show when the channel took the air on 1 September.

Lisa-Marie hosted showbiz news for industry endorsed channel Eat Cinema and fronted game shows The Great Big British Quiz and The Big Deal as well as Sky Vegas.

Over the last five years she has hosted golf and poker programmes for Sky Sports including the Mackenzie Sir Bobby Robson celebrity golf classic in July 2008, the PGA Tour and the Partypoker.net World Series of Poker with commentator Jesse May.

She is now on the channel and tables of Sky Poker replacing Kara Scott and Michelle Orpe.

As the voice of Sky Showbiz News online in 2009 she narrated a Perez Hilton style audio blog and is also the face of Aviva online.
