= 25 Beautiful Homes =

British interior design magazine

- Editor-in-Chief: Deborah Barker
- Categories: Interior design
- Frequency: Monthly
- Circulation: 72,169 (ABC Jan - June 2016); Print and digital editions.
- Publisher: Time Inc. (UK) Ltd.
- First issue: April 1998; 27 years ago
- Country: United Kingdom
- Language: English
- Website: 25 Beautiful Homes

25 Beautiful Homes is a monthly interior design magazine published by IPC Media. It has been edited by Deborah Barker since 2009.

== History and profile ==
25 Beautiful Homes was started in 1998. The magazine's first editor was Sally O'Sullivan before leaving IPC Media to set up her own company Cabal Communications. The magazine is published on a monthly basis.

The circulation of 25 Beautiful Homes was 101,566 copies between July and December 2013 and 97,611 copies during the first half of 2014.
