= Ostrich Media =

Ostrich Media is a company created in 2005 as a wholly owned subsidiary of 4Ventures Limited (the commercial subsidiary of the public-service commercial broadcaster Channel 4 Television Corporation).

The company is currently part of Wireless Group and has run Brain Box for both UTV and South African channel, E-TV. It was also the owner of QuizCall, the UK's first dedicated quiz television channel.

== Sale ==
Following a sale in November 2006, Ostrich Media became wholly owned by iTouch. Reports suggested the reasons for the sale included:

- the fact that Ostrich's QuizCall channel was not performing to expectations
- fears that the subsidiary might damage the Channel 4 brand
- a pending investigation of participation TV by the regulator Ofcom and a desire by Channel 4 not to appear too aggressively commercial ahead of an Ofcom review into public service broadcasting.
- a desire by Channel 4 to free the spectrum that it occupied on Freeview for other purposes.

Consequently, whilst the sale included QuizCall's space on Sky Digital, Channel 4 retained the space the channel had used on Freeview. As a result of the loss of space, QuizCall stopped broadcasting 24-hours per day on Freeview on 15 November 2006.

Following the sale, a review of the channel saw its broadcast hours reduced to accommodate an expected drop in viewers when the channel lost its 24-hour DTT space. A significant number of freelance presenters ceased working for the channel due to the reduction in broadcast time. The company was managed at the time by Director-General of Green Media LTD, Nathan Bond.

== Controversy ==
In late November 2006, Channel 4 issued an apology after staff were revealed to have impersonated competition winners to encourage more people to call in. Ostrich's Frederik Fleck then conceded before the Common's Culture, Media and Sport Committee that telephone lines may have been blocked to stop callers from getting through.

== Recent history ==
The QuizCall channel ceased broadcasting on Sky Digital and aired on Channel 5 until 9 September 2009.

On 31 March 2010, UTV purchased Ostrich Media to form a new division to be known as UTV Interactive.
