= Georgina Burnett =

British television presenter

- Born: 7 December 1978 (age 47); Sydney, Australia
- Occupation: Television presenter
- Children: 1
- Website: www.georginaburnett.com

Georgina Burnett (born 7 December 1978) is an Australian-born British television presenter.

== Early life ==
Burnett was born on 7 December 1978 in Sydney, Australia. When she was three years old, her family moved to the United Kingdom, settling in Dorset. She is of European and Polynesian descent and has three brothers.

== Career ==
Burnett is a DIY and interior design enthusiast and has been investing in and developing properties since 2009. One of her properties was featured in Metro and 25 Beautiful Homes. She shares her knowledge and ideas through her blog and online channel The Home Genie.

Burnett is a regular presenter for ITV's This Morning where she has shown how to upcycle household items and general home improvement, decluttering and styling. She is also a regular presenter for Ideal Home Show and Grand Designs Live.

Burnett's book The Street-wise Guide to Buying, Improving and Selling Your Home was published in March 2019. She has also written expert advice for The Sunday Times, The Sunday Telegraph, The Guardian, The Independent, 25 Beautiful Homes and a number of other interiors magazines.

Burnett was formerly a weather presenter and news reporter for all the UK nations and regions, most commonly BBC London News, BBC Scotland, BBC Cymru Wales, BBC Northern Ireland, BBC South East Today, BBC Look East, and BBC South Today, and also presents the weather for a number of BBC regional radio stations.

== Personal life ==
In February 2023, Burnett announced on Twitter that she had split from her husband Andy Flawn; the couple share a daughter.
