= Beverley French =

British model and television presenter

Beverley "Bev" French (born 1970) is a British model and television presenter. She was the former presenter of The Mint on ITV Play. She has also presented The Great Big British Quiz and Rovers Return Quiz.

== Career ==
- The Great Big British Quiz
- The Mint - 2 April 2006 - 15 February 2007
