= Make Your Play =

British phone-in quiz show

- Starring: Several presenters
- Country of origin: United Kingdom

Production
- Running time: Various
- Production company: Granada Productions

Original release
- Network: ITV, ITV Play
- Release: 29 September 2006 – 23 December 2007

Make Your Play was a live, interactive quiz show, showing in the UK on the ITV Network, from Monday to Saturday, beginning after midnight. The show was launched on Friday 29 September 2006 on ITV and ITV Play.

The prizes were greater than usually available on ITV Play (often exceeding £20,000), but as a result of this, callers are usually taken less often.

In order to win money, viewers had to either call in at a cost of 75p from a BT landline, or enter through the ITV website. If they were successful, they would have been placed on hold, then transferred live to the studio if they was lucky, where they then went on to deliver their answer.

Make Your Play had given over £3 million. It went over the £3 million mark on 1 July 2007, when a contestant by the name of Mr Joseph Percy said "next day". An on screen graphic was then shown saying "£3 Million Given Away" accompanied with a siren sound effect.

== Controversy ==
A game where viewers were invited to "add the pence" was criticised for providing a solution which was all but impossible to reach.

In February and March 2007, ITV Play and all shows associated with it were suspended after allegations that consumers were being cheated. ITV decided to suspend these services – which included phone-in votes and competitions on shows such as Dancing on Ice and This Morning – while an independent review was carried out to see if members of the public were getting a fair deal when they rang in. The problem was shortly resolved, and the ITV Play channel was closed down "permanently".

An announcement on 12 September 2007 confirmed that the show, along with similar late night phone ins, would be phased out by the end of 2007.

ITV Play's Glitterball ended on 30 September 2007. As a result, Make Your Play was extended, running six nights a week until the closure of ITV Play, with the last Make Your Play being broadcast on the morning of 23 December 2007.

On 1 July 2009, former presenter Ben Baldwin announced via his Twitter page that Make Your Play would launch as a stand-alone channel on Freeview and Sky on 19 January 2010. So far, Make Your Play has yet to return to the air.

== Presenters ==
=== Presenters at time of original demise ===
- Ben Baldwin
- Zö Christien
- Yolly Koppel
- Charlie McArdle
- Russ Spencer

=== Other presenters ===
- Emily Booth
- Alex Kramer
- Dave O'Riley
- Katy Pullinger

Guest Presenters

- Anna Fowler
- Mel Peachey
