= The Mint (British game show) =

British phone-in quiz show

- The Mint logo
- Genre: Game show
- Country of origin: United Kingdom

Production
- Running time: Various

Original release
- Network: ITV; ITV2; ITV Play
- Release: 1 April 2006 – 15 February 2007

Related
- The Mint Extra

The Mint was a live, late night, interactive quiz show with celebrity guests and live studio contestants filmed on a large extravagant set designed to look like the inside of a mansion. The programme, which was dogged by criticism that its questions were ambiguous and arbitrary, aired on ITV and ITV2, Sunday to Wednesday. On 26 February 2007, ITV announced that The Mint would return to screens later in 2007; however, an announcement on 12 September 2007 confirmed that the show, along with similar late-night phone ins, would not be returning.

The business model of The Mint and similar ITV Play shows was to generate revenue by encouraging viewers to call a premium-rate telephone number.

== Overview ==
The Mint was produced by Ludus:ETV, and was one of the main programmes showing nightly on ITV and ITV2. One of the criticisms levelled against the programmes makers ITV, is that the presenters created an illusion that the lines were "open" for calls when in fact the programme continued to take vast numbers of calls from so-called contestants.

Cash prizes on offer were usually larger than other British phone-in quizzes and the programme gave away large sums of money (usually £10,000–£30,000 for top answers depending on the bonuses they were doing at the time e.g. Top money – £10,000 but on quadruple money it would be £40,000).

The programme was first shown early in the morning on Saturday 1 April 2006 (Late Friday night). It typically lasted for anything from 2 hours to 4 hours, depending on ITV scheduling. To win money viewers had to either call in at a cost of seventy five pence (previously sixty pence) from a BT landline, text the word 'MINT' to a special number or enter through the ITV website and, if selected, would be issued a freephone number and PIN valid for one entry. If they were successful they would be placed on hold then, if the computer selected them at random, they would be transferred live to The Mint mansion, where they went on to give their answer.

== The Mint ==
The titular 'Mint' was a large vault situated at the back of the themed set and inside was a £100,000 prize. £1 was added to the £100,000 jackpot for every minute the programme was on air without finding a winner. A chance to play for the jackpot was given to winners of the standard games whenever a correct answer was given, the jackpot prize was awarded if players could guess the 4-digit code that opened The Mint. This code was locked in the computer and only changed when someone had won the prize. No-one in the studio or on the production team knew the code. After a number of wrong guesses, the producers would reveal the first number and later, the second, leaving viewers having to guess the remaining digits.

On 12 May 2006, the last two numbers were guessed correctly and over £108,000 was won.

On 20 October 2006 at about 2.15 am, The Mint's second jackpot was given away totalling just over £130,721.

== The Mint Mansion ==
The Mint Mansion was not referred to as a 'set' and the presenters played along with the fiction that they were all friends who lived in the mansion. The other presenters who were not working on a particular night were said to be "upstairs sleeping". Some of the presenters occasionally slipped up and called the mansion a set or mentioned that certain other presenter were not in that day; when this occurred they normally corrected themselves and tried to maintain the illusion.

When the presenters needed to refer to the producer/director (and other people who normally reside in the gallery of such TV shows) they called them "people in the Utility Room" or the "Butlers". The camera men were referred to as 'the window cleaner' (due to them looking in on the proceedings).

When celebrity guests were about to appear a doorbell sound effect was played, and when their time on the programme was up a distant car horn sound effect was played (this was supposed to be the guest's cab home).

Segments were linked by canned footage of (supposedly) the mansion and its grounds with Securicor style security guards standing outside the front door.

== Champagne bottle ==
In addition to the clock that all other phone-in game shows used to spur callers on (and get them waiting on the phone lines), The Mint also used a large animated graphic of a champagne bottle in the lower portion of the screen. This would pop (accompanied by a sound effect and relevant animation) at random moments signifying when a caller would be plucked from the lines and come through to the studio. Some of the presenters made gags about this bottle "popping its cork" and they often pretended to interact with it in a variety of ways, this was especially true of Brian Dowling.

== Added incentives to play ==
- Bonus amount of cash for a limited time (e.g., extra £2,000; sometimes, the top answer increased to £15,000 and even £30,000)
- Turbo Round (Back-to-back calls taking only callers names and answers. The presenters occasionally played their own game of trying to take as many calls as possible in the allotted five minutes. The record stands at 54 callers)
- Chance at The Mint (Chance to guess The Mint's 4-digit combination, potentially winning over £100,000)
- Added money each time a wrong answer was received (prize money on offer grows)
- Double money, Triple Money, Quadruple Money, Quintuple Money or Sextuple Money
- Caller got two guesses at the puzzle
- Occasionally, special prizes were offered instead of cash prizes, such as a brand-new Mini or a holidays.

== Caller selection ==
When a caller was selected at random a message was played to them over the telephone that said the computer would try to connect the call through to the studio. However, not everyone got through immediately. Calls were not vetted so when the contestants got through they could, and occasionally did, say anything. Some contestants had to wait around 5 minutes (still only charged one flat rate of 75p) to be selected.

=== 2007 British television phone-in scandal ===
The 2007 British television phone-in scandal involved allegations against phone-in segments of television programmes and quiz channels conning viewers.

On 23 April 2007, the long-running BBC programme Panorama showed a brief clip of The Mint where viewers were shown a wordsearch-style 4x4 grid and asked to find the name of an animal. The grid contained many animal names, but only one would win the viewer the prize money. The grid was set up as follows:

C	A	T	Y
D	O	G	A
L	V	S	K
H	E	N	R

After no-one was able to find the prize winning answer, the grid was removed from the screen and the answer was revealed to be tuna. When Panorama, who had recorded an episode of The Mint, looked back at the grid, they discovered that "Tuna" was not, in fact, present within the grid as the letter "U" was absent.

== Music ==
An excerpt from "Celebration" by Kool & The Gang used to be played whenever a contestant won money.

An excerpt from "Yeh Yeh" by Georgie Fame used to be played whenever a contestant won money.

== Extra Mint and The Mint Extra ==
The Mint Extra, originally called Extra Mint, was an early evening version of The Mint shown on ITV's newly-launched ITV Play channel. Extra Mint was produced by Granada Productions & Gallowgate and presented by one presenter and gave away much smaller sums of money to winners, featuring very different games than the late-night edition. There was no Mint to be opened in this version of the show and the vault was covered up by a false wall with a painting hung on it.

== Mr. and Mrs. Mint ==
Towards the end of November 2006, The Mint started a search for Mr. and Mrs. Mint, the presenters asked viewers to submit pictures of themselves via E-mail. On Monday 27 November presenters Beverley French and Mark Rumble unveiled the top 3 females, the night after (28 November), Beverley French and Brian Dowling unveiled the top 3 males.

The 6 finalists were live in the studio on the night of the final (29 November), they were:

=== Female finalists ===
- Ria, a former child model.
- Adele, self-proclaimed vegan warrior princess.
- Erin, a barmaid.

=== Male finalists ===
- Adam Greeno, a railway engineer.
- Patrick Cooney, a part-time Latin American.
- Jay, who had just graduated from college with an HNC in construction and was working in a call centre.

=== Celebrity judges ===
On Wednesday 29 November 3 celebrity judges joined presenters Yiolanda Koppel, Craig Stevens and the 6 finalists in the Mint Mansion to ask the finalists questions and then cast the final vote on who should become Mr. or Mrs. Mint.

- Beccy Jones, a Fitness Instructor.
- Page 3 model Phil Spencer.
- Actor Simon Cole, who played Jeremy Peterson in British soap opera, Hollyoaks.

=== Result ===
After questioning all of the contestants the judges were sent away to make their decision. They were recalled towards the end of the programme to give their scores, each judge having to mark the contestant on a scale of 1–10, then the 3 judges scores were added together to give the final result.

#	Rob	Leilani	Simon	Total
Ria	8	9	8	25
Adele	9	8	9	26 [Mrs. Mint]
Erin	8	8	8	24
Adam	8	8	9	25
Andrew	8	9	9	26 [Mr. Mint]
Jay	8	8	8	24

The winners were given £5,000 each and the runners up a bottle of champagne.

== Final broadcast of the series ==
The final episode of the series of The Mint aired on 15 February 2007. The presenters insisted that the programme was 'taking a break' and would return later in the year. An announcement by ITV on 12 September 2007 confirmed that the programme, along with similar late night phone ins, would not be returning.

== Reception ==
The Mint was criticized for misleading questions.

The Herald wrote that The Mint "is a ruse so simple, so tacky that it makes The X Factor look like an HBO production. Its sole reason for existence is to part people from their money."

== See also ==
- The Mint (Australian game show)
