= Television in Switzerland =

Television in Switzerland was introduced in the 1940s, with regular broadcasts commencing in 1953. People who live in Switzerland are required by law to pay a television licence fee, which is used to finance the public radio and television service SRG SSR.

Since 1 January 2021, the Licence fee cost in all the linguistic regions of Switzerland is 335 CHF per year or 83.75 CHF quarterly (with a 2 CHF fee if paid via LSV+, Debit Direct, or e-billing, and the invoice is sent via email), counting both radio and television licences. All licence fee payers are entitled under the law to services of equal quality. The fee is charged per household and not per person, with empty dwellings being exempt. The fee is determined by the Federal Council.

== History ==
=== Early development (1920s-1950s) ===
The foundations of television technology were established in the 1920s, building upon partially known 19th-century technologies. In 1925, Charles Francis Jenkins in the United States and John Logie Baird in England presented the first public television systems. By 1931, the British Broadcasting Corporation (BBC) offered the first regular television programmes. However, international development of the new medium was delayed until the 1940s due to competition between mechanical and electronic models, with the electronic system ultimately prevailing in the 1930s through the adoption of the cathode-ray tube and standardization of scanning lines.

Switzerland's first encounter with television came at the Swiss National Exhibition of 1939, when ETH Zurich (Swiss Federal Institute of Technology) conducted the country's first television broadcast experiment using a 405-line transmission standard. The Swiss Broadcasting Corporation (SRG), founded in 1931 and later renamed to include television in 1960, filmed a theatrical performance and transmitted it to a television screen. In 1943, Fritz Fischer presented a technique based on the eidophor, a projector that would long be used for large-screen visualizations.

During the second half of the 1940s, both the PTT (Postal, Telephone and Telegraph services) and the SRG closely monitored television developments abroad and conducted joint experimental trials with ETH Zurich.

=== Regular broadcasting begins (1950s-1960s) ===
Following the enactment of federal legislation to finance a Swiss television pilot enterprise, the SSR began systematic testing in Zürich in 1953, implementing a regular trial programme broadcast for one hour daily on weekdays. Additional tests were conducted in Basel and French-speaking Switzerland. Regular television service commenced in 1958, initially broadcasting in German and French, with Italian programming beginning in 1961. Studios were established from 1960 onwards in Zürich, Geneva, and Lugano, while Basel and Lausanne did not receive production facilities.

The organizational structure closely linked television to radio through the SSR, despite opposition from some radio circles concerned about the future of their medium. This arrangement, consistent with European practices, reflected the intention to develop a public service based on radio broadcasting experience. As with radio, all technical aspects were entrusted to the PTT. Only since the adoption of the new 1988 concession has the SRG been required to procure its own studio equipment, while Swisscom (successor to the PTT) provides and maintains transmitting stations and connections, and collects reception fees through Billag and later Serafe AG (from 2019).

While the pilot testing phase counted only 920 subscribers, predominantly café and restaurant owners, the number had reached 50,000 by 1959. The milestone of one million households was surpassed in 1968, coinciding with the introduction of colour television. Télévision suisse romande broadcast their first evening programme in colour in 1968.

Romansh-speaking Swiss had to wait until 1963 for the first programme in their language, a full decade after regular television transmission were initiated. To this day, there is no dedicated Romansh-language channel; instead the German and Italian channels air a few hours of Romansh programming per day.

=== International cooperation and Eurovision ===
Swiss television's relations with foreign stations were founded on cooperation from the outset, driven by the small size of the Swiss market and its linguistic fragmentation, leading to co-production contracts and broadcasting agreements with neighbouring countries. The SRG played a dominant role in creating Eurovision, the international programme exchange network. In 1947, Marcel Bezençon launched the idea of an international television programme exchange, and in 1954, coverage of the Narcissus Festival in Montreux was broadcast in England, France, Belgium, the Netherlands, Denmark, Germany, and Italy. The 1954 FIFA World Cup, held in Switzerland the same year, also contributed to the success of international transmissions. The first intercontinental satellite exchange via Telstar occurred in 1962.

=== Advertising and regulatory framework ===
The conflict between television and publishers and advertisers, who feared competition from the new medium particularly in the advertising market, was resolved in 1957. According to the signed agreement, the SRG received two million francs annually for up to ten years, or until reaching 180,000 subscribers, as a contribution to its development, while renouncing advertising revenue. Television advertising was authorized in 1965, initially limited to twelve minutes daily and remaining prohibited on Sundays and holidays, as well as programme interruptions, until 1992.

A constitutional article on radio and television was introduced in 1984, serving as the basis for regulation. Apart from some local experiments in the early 1970s, the SRG long maintained a de facto monopoly as a television programme provider.

=== Second channels and competition ===
The project for a second German-language television channel (DRS, later Schweizer Radio und Fernsehen SRF), initially called S Plus in 1993, then Schweiz 4, initially failed before finding its lasting form as SF 2 in 1997. Originally conceived as a channel for the entire country, primarily intended for national integration, this idea had to be revised. In 1997, Télévision Suisse Romande (TSR, later Radio Télévision Suisse RTS from 2010) and Swiss Italian television (RTSI, later Radiotelevisione Svizzera RSI from 2009) also obtained second channels. SRF zwei, RTS Deux and RSI La 2 came into existence.

In 1984, the Swiss teletext service, SWISS TXT, was started.

On September 27, 1993, Martin Lambie-Nairn created for TSI the iconic idents and commercial bumpers of the "masked troubadour", played by Joplin Sibtain, which would last until the launch of TSI 2 for unknown reasons.

=== Market liberalization and private television ===
The 1991 federal law on radio and television opened the way for the cautious introduction of a dual system, in which the SRG, as a public service subject to an extensive service mandate, remained advantaged over private channels, especially at the national level. Tele 24, the first private channel receivable throughout the country, began service in 1998, followed by TV 3 in 1999. However, neither managed to reach sufficient audiences in the narrow German-Swiss market without state support and both were closed in 2001. Specialized channels like Star TV (launched in 1995) and Viva Schweiz (created in 1999 as Viva Swizz) had more success, although the latter also ceased broadcasting at the end of 2018.

Numerous local television stations also appeared, with limited daily broadcasting hours. Several Swiss and foreign companies secured participation in the modest but lucrative Swiss television market through advertising and programming windows. By 2003, almost all German private channels (RTL, RTL2, ProSieben, Sat.1, Kabel eins, Vox) in German-speaking Switzerland and M6 in French-speaking Switzerland offered Swiss regional advertising blocks, sometimes in connection with popular programmes and magazines. Major Swiss media operated or supplied similar windows (for example NZZ Format, Cash TV, Basler Zeitung).

The Federal Office of Communications in Biel/Bienne, created in 1992, is responsible for regulation and compliance with programme and advertising directives.

=== Digital transition ===
Analogue television was phased out starting July 2006, when TSI (now RSI) began the analogue switchoff. The process continued until January 2008, when the end of analogue broadcasting in Valais and Chablais completed the digital television transition in Switzerland.

In September 2018, SRG SSR announced that it would discontinue over-the-air broadcasting in DVB-T in 2019, citing costs, rather than implement DVB-T2. The services remain available via IPTV and encrypted free-to-view satellite, which offers all SRG SSR channels in high definition.

== List of channels ==
The following is a list of television channels broadcast in Switzerland:

=== German-speaking Switzerland ===
Switzerland receives some domestic cable networks from Germany, which may involve the substitution of German advertising with domestic Swiss advertising by the local provider.

- SRF 1: the first of the three national German-language channels in Switzerland (the others being SRF zwei and SRF info). Run under the public SRG SSR broadcasting group. SRF 1 is considered to be the channel that airs more local programming, infotainment and other programmes of that nature.
- SRF zwei: Channel programming consists of sports, youth programmes, movies and a wide range of American prime time shows.
- SRF info: news channel owned by the public broadcasting group.
- 3sat: public, advertising-free, television network run jointly by the public broadcasters of Germany, Austria and Switzerland. It is available off the ASTRA satellite to all of Europe and North Africa and West Asia.
- 3+: Swiss general programming channel launched in 2006. Programming consists mainly of reality shows, infotainment and American fiction.
- 3+ Movies: Swiss channel broadcasting since 2012.
- 3+ Focus: Swiss channel geared towards an older audience launched in 2013. Programming consists mainly of documentaries.
- 3+ Adrenalin: Swiss channel broadcasting since 2014.
- 3+ Series: Swiss channel broadcasting since 2014.
- 3+ Emotion: Swiss channel broadcasting since 2016.
- 3+ Crime: Swiss channel broadcasting since 2019.
- 3+ Family: Swiss channel broadcasting since 2021. Programming consists mainly of series and comedy. and timeshared with Nickelodeon Schweiz
- Sat.1 Schweiz: Swiss version of Sat.1. It differs from the latter in some local programming and regionalised advertising.
- ProSieben Schweiz: Swiss version of ProSieben. It differs from the latter in some local programming and regionalised advertising.
- Kabel eins Schweiz: Swiss version of Kabel eins. It differs from the latter in some local programming and regionalised advertising.
- Puls 8: Swiss channel of entertainment programming consists of reality shows, series and movies.
- Swiss1: Programming consists mainly of information, sport, documentary and cinema.
- Star TV: cinema and lifestyle channel, with movies and programs about upcoming movies in theaters and in the home market, musical programs (mainly videoclips) and programs about videogames.
- Nickelodeon Schweiz: domestic sub-feed of Nickelodeon (Germany). and timeshared with 3+ Family.
- Swiss Sport TV: sports channel, focusing on less popular sports.
- Blue TV: pay-TV company, operating several movie channels and a wide offer of live sports from Switzerland and abroad.
- German channels available in Switzerland with local advertising: RTL, RTL Zwei, Super RTL, VOX, sixx, Sat.1 Gold, ProSieben Maxx, DMAX and TLC.
- Unlocalised German and Austrian channels available in Switzerland; all public and most commercial channels from the neighbouring countries are widely available in Switzerland through IPTV and cable TV.

=== Most-viewed channels ===
The channels with the largest viewing share in 2023 (1. Semester) are:

Position	Channel	Group	Share of total viewing (%)
1	SRF 1	SRG SSR	18.9
2	SRF zwei	SRG SSR	8.7
3	ZDF	ZDF	6.6
4	Das Erste	ARD	5.6
5	RTL	RTL Group	5.3
6	VOX	RTL Group	3.0
7	Sat.1	ProSiebenSat.1 Media	2.9
8	ProSieben	ProSiebenSat.1 Media	2.4
9	3+	CH Media	1.9
10	SRF info	SRG SSR	1.8

=== French-speaking Switzerland ===
Switzerland receives some domestic cable networks from France, which may involve the substitution of French advertising with domestic Swiss advertising by the local provider.

- RTS 1: the first Swiss French language public television channel. Run under the public SRG SSR broadcasting group. RTS 1 runs a general schedule with a focus on news and local programming.
- RTS 2: The channel's programming is composed of reruns from the RTS 1 television archive, children's television programs in the morning and early afternoon, teens programs in the late afternoon and evening and cultural programs or sports transmissions during prime time.
- RTS Info: virtual television channel, owned by Télévision Suisse Romande, and launched on 26 December 2006. It broadcasts 24 hours a day using an internet stream, and many times (especially in the night and the early morning) simulcasts on RTS 2.
- CARAC 1: Swiss general programming channel launched in 2008. Programming consists mainly of movies, series and music.
- CARAC 2: Swiss channel broadcasting since 2016.
- CARAC 3: Swiss channel broadcasting since 2015.
- CARAC 4: Swiss channel broadcasting since 2017.
- CARAC 5: Swiss channel broadcasting since 2025.
- TVM3: first private channel allowed to broadcast in the whole Romandy after the shutdown of Télécinéromandie. It began transmission on 1 May 2004.
- TV5MONDE: global television network, broadcasting several channels of French-language programming.
- TF1 Suisse: Swiss version of TF1. It differs from the latter only in the regionalised advertising.
- M6 Suisse: Swiss version of M6. It differs from the latter only in the regionalised advertising.
- W9 Suisse: Swiss version of W9. It differs from the latter only in the regionalised advertising.
- TMC Suisse: Swiss version of TMC. It differs from the latter only in the regionalised advertising.
- TFX Suisse: Swiss version of TFX. It differs from the latter only in the regionalised advertising.
- 6ter Suisse: Swiss version of 6ter. It differs from the latter only in the regionalised advertising.
- Cartoon Network Suisse: It differs from the latter only in the regionalised advertising.
- Disney Channel (France)
- Nickelodeon (France)
- Comedy Central (France)
- French channels available in Switzerland with local advertising: Canal+, CStar, AB3 and RTL9.
- Unlocalised French channels available in Switzerland; all public and most commercial channels from the neighbouring countries are widely available in Switzerland through IPTV and cable TV.

=== Italian-speaking Switzerland ===
Switzerland receives some domestic cable networks from Italy, which may involve the substitution of Italian advertising with domestic Swiss advertising by the local provider.

- RSI La 1: general television channel, broadcasting in Italian for the Italian-speaking Swiss in the whole country. Run under the public SRG SSR broadcasting group. Its programming is made of game shows, news programmes, movies, documentaries and less frequently sports programmes.
- RSI La 2: Sister channel of RSI La 1, broadcast in Italian. It mainly transmits sport programs, but also reruns and music programs. It does not broadcast any newscast.
- Unlocalised Italian channels available in Switzerland; all public and most commercial channels from the neighbouring countries are widely available in Switzerland through IPTV and cable TV.

=== Romansh-speaking Switzerland ===
There are no television channels broadcasting exclusively in the Romansh language; instead, Radiotelevisiun Svizra Rumantscha's productions are transmitted on SRF 1, RSI La 2 and SRF info for a few minutes daily. Programming includes Telesguard (a newscast), Cuntrasts and l'Istorgia da buna notg (bedtime story).

== Regional channels ==
Local radio and television networks in Switzerland are entitled to 4% of the licence fee every year (about 50,000,000 CHF for 2007). The number of subsidised television broadcasters is limited to 13, one for each designated coverage area. Also, the support share cannot exceed 50% of the operating costs of each network.

- TB2: simulcast in German and French for the city of Biel/Bienne.
- TeleBärn: local television channel in German for the capital city of Bern and its surroundings.
- Telebasel: local television channel in German for the city of Basel.
- Tele M1: local television channel in German for the Mittelland region.
- Tele 1: local television channel in German for the area of Lucerne.
- TeleTicino: commercial television channel focusing on news from the Italian-speaking part of the country.
- Tele Top: local television channel in German for the area of Winterthur.
- TVO: local television channel in German for the eastern part of Switzerland.
- Tele Südostschweiz: local television channel in German for the canton of Graubünden.
- TeleZüri: originally a local station in the city of Zürich, the channel now is available throughout the German-speaking part of the country. It airs the most viewed nightly newscast of all commercial channels in Switzerland.
- Schaffhauser Fernsehen SHF: local television channel in German for the city of Schaffhausen.
- ZüriPlus: local television channel in German for the city of Zürich, an alternative to TeleZüri.
- Kanal 9: local television channel in German for the canton of Valais.
- Canal 9: local television channel in French for the canton of Valais.
- Canal Alpha: local television channel in French for the cantons of Neuchâtel and Jura.
- Léman Bleu: local television channel in French for the city of Geneva.
- La Télé: local television channel in French for the cantons of Vaud and Fribourg.

== Cable television ==
A vast majority of the country is covered by cable networks; the major cable television operators is Sunrise LLC (formerly UPC Switzerland).

In 2007, the Federal Office of Communications (OFCOM) applied a must-carry regulation, requiring the local cable companies to transmit all the SRG SSR network stations and the following foreign channels: arte, 3sat, Euronews, TV5MONDE, ARD, ORF eins, France 2, Rai Uno.

== International channels ==
All public and most commercial channels from the neighbouring countries are widely available in Switzerland through digital television services.

== Notes and references ==
This article incorporates text from a free content work. Licensed under CC-BY SA. Text taken from Télévision, Ursula Ganz-Blättler; Theo Mäusli, Historical Dictionary of Switzerland. Translated by Florence Piguet.

== See also ==
- Media in Switzerland
- SRG SSR
