= List of Central Michigan University people =

This is a list of notable alumni and faculty of Central Michigan University.

== Alumni ==
=== Acting ===
- Tim Allen – actor, Toy Story, Home Improvement (attended; transferred to Western Michigan University)
- Larry Joe Campbell – actor, co-starred on According to Jim as Andy
- Jeff Daniels – Emmy-winning actor, Terms of Endearment, Arachnophobia, Gettysburg, Dumb and Dumber, Good Night, and Good Luck, The Newsroom
- Carter Oosterhouse – reality TV star of Trading Spaces
- Terry O'Quinn – Emmy-winning actor, co-starred on Lost as John Locke
- Amy Roloff – reality TV star of Little People, Big World
- Brad Slaight – actor, The Young and the Restless, Love Chronicles, Unsolved Mysteries; comedian

=== Broadcasting ===
- Cam Brainard – voiceover artist and broadcaster
- Dick Enberg – Emmy-winning sports broadcaster
- Clark Howard – syndicated consumer talk-show host
- Edythe Lewis – pioneering Black disc jockey
- Lem Tucker – Emmy-winning correspondent, CBS News

=== Journalism ===
- Terry Foster – The Detroit News columnist and WXYT-FM radio host
- John Grogan – author of best-selling memoir Marley & Me and Philadelphia Inquirer columnist
- Lorrie Lynch – weekend editor, columnist, USA Today magazine
- Roger Schawinski – Swiss media pioneer and founder of TeleZüri and Tele24
- Drew Sheneman – award-winning editorial cartoonist, The Star-Ledger

=== Politics and military ===
- Ralph Baker – U.S. Army brigadier general
- Matt Bevin – former governor of Kentucky
- Kevin Cotter – former speaker of the Michigan House of Representatives
- Vivien Crea – U.S. Coast Guard vice admiral and 25th vice commandant of the United States Coast Guard
- Don Davis – U.S. representative from North Carolina's 1st congressional district (2023-)
- Michael P. DeLong – U.S. Marine Corps lieutenant general
- Leah Gazan – Canadian Member of Parliament for Winnipeg Centre
- Robert P. Griffin – United States senator and House of Representatives member
- Scott Haraburda – U.S. Army colonel and president of Indiana Society of Professional Engineers
- Joseph R. Inge – U.S. Army lieutenant general
- Reuben D. Jones – U.S. Army major general
- William F. Kernan – U.S. Army general and commander of Joint Forces Command
- Dan Kildee – United States representative for Michigan's 5th congressional district
- Alveda King – activist, author, and former state representative for the 28th District in the Georgia House of Representatives; niece of Martin Luther King Jr.
- Andrea LaFontaine – represents 32nd District in Michigan House of Representatives
- Brenda Lawrence – United States representative for Michigan's 14th congressional district, former mayor of Southfield, Michigan, and 2010 Democratic Party nominee for lieutenant governor of Michigan
- Michael R. Lehnert – U.S. Marine Corps major general
- Mike Maturen – 2016 United States presidential candidate
- Serena McIlwain – secretary of the Maryland Department of the Environment
- Herbert H. McMillan – former Maryland state delegate
- William Nolde – U.S. Army colonel; last official combat casualty of Vietnam War
- Thomas M. Pappas – U.S. Army colonel disciplined from the Abu Ghraib prisoner abuse scandal
- Pete Peterson – U.S. Air Force colonel and Florida representative
- Lorraine K. Potter – 14th chief of chaplains of the United States Air Force
- Philip Potvin – represents 102nd district in Michigan House of Representatives
- Joseph Ralston – U.S. Air Force general and commander of NATO
- John W. Raymond – U.S. Space Force general
- Verlina Reynolds-Jackson – politician who represents the 15th Legislative District in the New Jersey General Assembly
- Courtney Rogers – U.S. Air Force lieutenant colonel and Tennessee Representative
- Jimmy D. Ross – U.S. Army general and commander of Army Materiel Command
- John B. Sams – U.S. Air Force lieutenant general and commander of 15th Air Force
- Marni Sawicki – former mayor of Cape Coral, Florida
- Peter Schoomaker – 35th chief of staff of the United States Army
- Norton A. Schwartz – 19th chief of staff of the Air Force
- Mary Sheffield – mayor of Detroit, former president of the Detroit City Council
- Lance L. Smith – U.S. Air Force general
- Michael D. Steele – U.S. Army colonel
- Stephen Twitty – U.S. Army major general, commanding officer of Fort Bliss
- Anthony Zinni – businessman and retired U.S. Marine Corps general

=== Sports ===
- Curtis Adams – former National Football League running back for the San Diego Chargers
- Zach Azzanni – NFL wide receivers coach for the Las Vegas Raiders
- Phil Baroni – former professional MMA fighter formerly with the UFC
- Dan Bazuin – former NFL defensive end for the Chicago Bears
- Walter Beach – former NFL safety for the Cleveland Browns
- Nick Bellore – NFL fullback for the Washington Commanders
- Ray Bentley – former NFL linebacker, primarily with the Buffalo Bills; ESPN broadcaster
- Jim Bowman – former NFL defensive back for the New England Patriots
- Mark Brisker – American-Israeli professional basketball player
- Antonio Brown – former NFL wide receiver for the Pittsburgh Steelers
- Josh Collmenter – former MLB player with the Arizona Diamondbacks
- Tyler Conklin – NFL tight end for the Los Angeles Chargers
- Paris Cotton –former CFL running back with the Winnipeg Blue Bombers
- Tom Crean – head men's basketball coach for the Indiana Hoosiers (2008–2017)
- Todd Dagenais – former head coach for UCF Knights women's volleyball
- Titus Davis – former NFL wide receiver
- Tony F. Elliott – former NFL defensive back for the Green Bay Packers
- Paul Emmel – former MLB umpire
- Dietrich Enns – MLB pitcher
- Tony Ferguson (attended) – mixed martial artist, The Ultimate Fighter 13 winner, currently competing in the UFC's Lightweight Division
- Eric Fisher – former NFL offensive tackle for the Indianapolis Colts
- Eric Ghiaciuc – former NFL center for the Cincinnati Bengals
- Luke Goedeke – NFL offensive tackle for the Tampa Bay Buccaneers
- Josh Gordy – former NFL defensive back for the Indianapolis Colts
- Brock Gutierrez – former NFL center, primarily for the Detroit Lions
- Troy Hairston – former NFL fullback for the Houston Texans
- Gary Hogeboom – former NFL quarterback for the Dallas Cowboys
- Nate Huffman – professional basketball player, 2001 Israeli Basketball Premier League MVP
- Tory Humphrey – former NFL tight end for the New Orleans Saints
- Robert Jackson – former NFL defensive back for the Cincinnati Bengals
- Cullen Jenkins – former NFL defensive end for the Green Bay Packers
- Stephen Jones – former CFL All-Star and Grey Cup champion
- Chris Kaman – former NBA player
- Donte Kent – NFL defensive back for the Pittsburgh Steelers
- Adam Kieft – former NFL offensive tackle for the Cincinnati Bengals
- Chris Knapp – former MLB pitcher
- Dan LeFevour – former NFL quarterback with the Jacksonville Jaguars, Chicago Bears, and Indianapolis Colts
- Andy MacDonald – former head coach for Northern Arizona Lumberjacks football (1965–1968)
- James McElroy – former NBA player for the New Orleans Jazz and the Atlanta Hawks
- Dan Majerle – former NBA player, primarily for the Phoenix Suns
- Zach McKinstry – MLB player currently with the Detroit Tigers
- Suzy Merchant – former women's basketball head coach, Michigan State
- Drew Mormino –former NFL offensive lineman for the Miami Dolphins
- Shane Morris –former Arena Football League quarterback for the Baltimore Brigade
- Sean Murphy-Bunting – NFL cornerback for the Arizona Cardinals
- Lew Nichols III – NFL running back for the Pittsburgh Steelers
- Marguerite Pearson – former All-American Girls Professional Baseball League player and athletic instructor at CMU
- Kito Poblah – former CFL wide receiver, primarily for the Winnipeg Blue Bombers
- Jim Podoley – former NFL wide receiver for the Washington Redskins
- Ben Poquette – former NBA player for the Detroit Pistons
- Ryan Radcliff – former quarterback
- Bernhard Raimann – NFL offensive tackle for the Indianapolis Colts
- Thomas Rawls – former NFL running back for the Seattle Seahawks
- Mose Rison – former head coach for North Carolina Central Eagles football (2007–2010)
- Dan Roundfield – former NBA player, primarily with the Atlanta Hawks
- Cooper Rush – NFL quarterback for the Baltimore Ravens
- Chase Simon (born 1989) – basketball player for Maccabi Ashdod of the Israeli Basketball Premier League
- Joe Staley – former NFL offensive tackle, first-round draft pick of the San Francisco 49ers (2007)
- George "The Animal" Steele – former professional wrestler
- Kevin Tapani – former MLB pitcher, primarily with the Minnesota Twins
- Zurlon Tipton – former NFL running back for the Indianapolis Colts
- Tom Tresh – 1962 AL Rookie of the Year, former shortstop, primarily with the New York Yankees
- Jonathan Ward – former NFL running back for the Pittsburgh Steelers
- J. J. Watt – former NFL defensive lineman for the Houston Texans; left school after one year
- Grant Wolfram – MLB pitcher for the Baltimore Orioles
- Curt Young – former MLB pitcher, current pitching coach with the Oakland Athletics
- Frank Zombo – former NFL linebacker for the Kansas City Chiefs

=== Miscellaneous ===
- Angeline Boulley – author of Firekeeper's Daughter
- Jeffrey R. Caponigro – president and CEO of Caponigro Public Relations, Inc
- Harold Cronk – screenwriter, director, producer and founding partner at 10 West Studios
- Alex Cruz – former British Airways CEO
- Cerelyn J. Davis – Memphis chief of police
- DDG – YouTuber and rapper
- Andrew Dost – pianist in the Grammy Award-winning band Fun
- Dennis Frederiksen – vocalist
- James Kamsickas – chairman and CEO of Dana Incorporated
- Brandi Love – pornographic actress
- Guy Newland – professor of Philosophy and Religion
- Karen J. Nichols – physician and former medical school dean
- Terry Nichols – participant in the Oklahoma City bombing (attended 1 semester)
- Jennifer Schomaker, chemist, professor, researcher
- Bill Schwab – fine art photographer
- Keith Sintay – animation artist
- Lori Nelson Spielman – author
- C. W. Thornthwaite – geographer and climatologist

== Faculty ==
- Jeffrey Addicott – adjunct law professor
- Bill Ballenger – political science professor
- Stephen M. Colarelli – psychology professor
- Sidney Graham – math professor
- Mitchell K. Hall – history professor
- Eric A. Johnson – history professor
- Sari Ibrahim Khoury – art professor
- Charles V. Park – library science professor
- Paul Yu – philosophy professor
