= Geographical usage of television =

Ownership of televisions per capita in 2003. Darker colors indicate more televisions. Gray indicates no data.

The geographical usage of television varies around the world with a number of different transmission standards in use and differing approaches by government in relation to ownership and programme content.

== African networks and stations ==
Despite being the most economically advanced country on the continent, South Africa did not introduce TV until 1975, owing to opposition from the apartheid regime. Nigeria was one of the first countries in Africa to introduce television in 1959, followed by Zimbabwe (then Rhodesia) in 1961, while Zanzibar was the first in Africa to introduce colour television, in 1973. (Tanzania itself did not introduce television until 1994). The main satellite TV providers are the South African MultiChoice DStv service, and the predominantly French language Canal+ Afrique, owned by France's Canal+.

== Asian networks and stations ==
In Asia, television has traditionally been state-controlled, although the number of commercial television channels are increasing, as its competition currently goes from streaming television. Japan's NHK is a non-commercial network similar to the BBC, funded by a television license fee. However it's editorial independence over news and current affairs are questionable especially in judicial policy (Note: In March 2024, Nobuyuki Koga, former CEO of the Nomura Holdings was appointed as the Chairman of NHK.), compareing the broadcasters like India's state-run Doordarshan or China's China Central Television (CCTV).

In Malaysia, television was dominated by Radio Televisyen Malaysia (RTM), a government-owned agency, from 1963 until 1984. From 1984, however, private television stations started emerging, with TV3 being the only private broadcaster for ten years until the introduction of MetroVision, which was operated between 1995 and 1999. Even though TV Alhijrah began broadcasting, RTM and Media Prima still controls most of the free-to-air television market. Free-to-air television in Singapore is currently monopolised by Mediacorp, with 6 channels broadcast there.

From 2000 onwards, India also encouraged new private stations. Star TV, which was based in Hong Kong, expanded to other areas in Asia. The number of commercial broadcasters are indeed increasing in some countries; as of 2024, for example, Indonesia has 31 national commercial television networks compared to having just one before the introduction of RCTI.

=== Middle East networks and stations ===
Similarly in the Middle East, television has been heavily state-controlled, with considerable censorship of both news coverage and entertainment, particularly that imported from the West. This control of the medium has been eroded by the increasing availability of satellite TV, and the number of satellite channels in Arabic is second only to the number of satellite channels in English, the best known of which being the Qatar-based news service Al Jazeera.

== Australasian networks and stations ==
=== Australian networks and stations ===
Australian television began in 1956, just in time for the Melbourne Olympics. Australia has three nationwide metropolitan commercial networks (Seven, Nine and 10) as well as the ABC (Australian Broadcasting Corporation), a government owned, commercial free network; and SBS (Special Broadcasting Service) a commercial-supported, multi-lingual, government-owned station. The Australian Broadcasting Authority has also issued licenses to community groups to establish community television stations in most capital cities on LCN 44 for digital television. In regional and rural areas, numerous commercial stations are affiliated with one of the three metropolitan networks, and carry programming generally indistinguishable from their city cousins.

=== New Zealand networks and stations ===
Through the Crown entity Television New Zealand (TVNZ), the New Zealand government owns two television networks: TVNZ 1 and TVNZ 2. Both networks carry advertisements to fund their operations, although TVNZ 1 also receives government funding to provide local content under a public broadcasting charter.

Three, a fully commercial network, is owned by Warner Bros. Discovery. Another free-to-air network, Sky Open, is operated by Sky Network Television, a pay television company that also runs a digital satellite TV service. Sky Open carries programming from various sources, including Australia’s Nine Network.

The government also funds Whakaata Māori, which promotes Māori language and culture on New Zealand television. In addition, a number of regional television channels operate independently throughout the country.

== European networks and stations ==
=== National European networks ===
In much of Europe, television broadcasting has historically been state dominated, rather than commercially organised, although commercial stations have grown in number recently.

In most countries, the public broadcasters were the only television services available until the 1980s. These were usually funded by the state or a television license, but many countries have eventually adopted advertising in the public channels.

The United Kingdom was an early adopter of private television, launching the ITV network in 1955. Italy followed in the 1970s. Most countries got commercial broadcasters in the 1980s and 1990s, either by allowing private broadcasters to broadcast terrestrially or from broadcasters located in other countries. Some countries made room for private television by closing down or selling one of the state channels.

Most countries had two to six national broadcasters in the days of analogue television. Digital television has however allowed the number of terrestrial channels to multiply. Cable and satellite are also contributing to the increased number of channels, with hundreds of channels available to those willing to pay for it.

Every country has a public broadcaster and about one-four dominating commercial broadcasters (excluding smaller countries where local commercial broadcasters haven't been profitable), which are listed in the table below.

Country	Leading broadcasters	
Country	Public	Private
Albania	RTSH	Top Channel, Klan, Vizion Plus
Austria	ORF	ATV, Puls 4, Servus TV
Belarus	BTRC	ONT, CTV
Belgium	VRT, RTBF, BRF	SBS, VMMa, RTL TVI, AB3
Bosnia and Herzegovina	BHRT	
Bulgaria	BNT	bTV, Nova Television
Croatia	HRT	Nova TV, RTL
Czech Republic	Czech Television	TV Nova, TV Prima, TV Barrandov, Televize Seznam
Denmark	DR, TV2	MTG, SBS
Estonia	ETV	Kanal 2, TV3
Finland	YLE	MTV3, Nelonen, SBS
France	France Télévisions	TF1, M6
Germany	ARD, ZDF	RTL, ProSiebenSat.1
Greece	ERT	ANT1, Mega, Skai, Alpha, Star
Hungary	MTVA	TV2, RTL Klub
Iceland	RÚV	Stöð 2, Sjónvarp Símans
Ireland	RTÉ, Teilifís na Gaeilge	TV3
Italy	RAI	Mediaset, La7, Sky Italia
Kosovo	RTK	RTV21, KTV
Latvia	LTV	TV3
Lithuania	LRT	LNK, TV3
Luxembourg		RTL Télé Lëtzebuerg
North Macedonia	MRT	Sitel TV, Telma TV, Kanal 5, Alfa TV, Alsat
Malta	PBS	Smash Television, One, fLiving Channel, Xejk
Moldova	TRM	
Montenegro	RTCG	Nova, Vijesti, Prva, Adria
Netherlands	NPO	RTL Nederland, SBS
Norway	NRK	TV2, MTG, SBS
Poland	TVP	TVN, Polsat, TV Puls, Canal+ Premium
Portugal	RTP	SIC, TVI
Romania	TVR	Pro TV SRL, Antena TV Group, Kanal D, Prima TV
Russia	Channel One, Russia-1	
Serbia	RTS	Prva srpska televizija, B92, Pink TV, Nacionalna Televizija Happy
Slovakia	RTVS	Markíza, TV JOJ
Slovenia	RTV Slovenija	POP, Kanal A, Planet TV, TV3
Spain	TVE, FORTA	Telecinco, Antena 3, Cuatro, La Sexta
Sweden	SVT	TV4, MTG, SBS
Switzerland	RTS, RSI, SRF	3+, Puls 8, TVM3, CARAC1, TeleTicino
Turkey	TRT	Show TV, Star TV, Kanal D, Now, Atv
Ukraine	Suspilne	1+1, Inter
United Kingdom	BBC	ITV, Channel 4, Channel 5, Sky UK

The largest commercial European broadcaster is the Luxembourg-based RTL Group. Other media groups controlling European television broadcasters are ProSiebenSat.1 Media, Central European Media Enterprises and Viaplay Group.

=== Europe-wide networks ===
As Europe is a linguistical and culturally varied continent, the dominating broadcasters are either national or are operating in countries that share a language. Pan-European broadcasters exist, but they tend to adapt their content for different markets by providing different audio streams or completely separate channels with the same name. Channels available to all of Europe include Euronews and Eurosport.

== Latin American networks and stations ==
Currently, there are more than 1,500 television stations in all Latin America, according to the number of apparatuses by homes (more than 60 million), of more than two hundred million people. In countries like Mexico or Brazil, one or two networks claim almost all the audience. In other countries like Colombia or Chile, television broadcasting has historically been public-broadcast dominated until the 1990s. The largest commercial television groups are Mexico-based Televisa and Brazil-based Grupo Globo.

== North American networks and stations ==
=== Canadian networks and stations ===
In Canada, there are a number of national networks, including four main networks for English Canada. One, CBC Television, is owned by the Canadian Broadcasting Corporation, a government-funded Crown corporation. The other three, CTV, Global, and Citytv are privately run. The private networks usually use most of their primetime hours to rebroadcast U.S. shows, while the CBC airs more Canadian programming. Private systems — essentially mini-networks whose stations have a somewhat enhanced local focus and which do not reach all of Canada — include E! and CTV 2.

In French Canada, particularly Quebec, the main networks are the CBC-owned Ici Radio-Canada Télé, and private networks Noovo and TVA. These networks tend to air substantially more domestic programming in primetime than their English counterparts. There are also the Aboriginal Peoples Television Network, multiethnic broadcaster Omni Television, provincial educational networks, and a limited number of niche-interest or independent stations. Radio-Canada broadcasts across Canada, while TVA and TQS only broadcast terrestrial signals in Quebec and APTN only broadcasts terrestrially in the territories. TVA and APTN, however, are available on cable in all Canadian markets. TQS does not have national cable carriage rights, although it is available in some markets outside of Quebec with larger francophone communities.

Additional premium television or specialty channels are also available in both languages through cable and satellite television. Notable examples include CBC Newsworld, TSN, MuchMusic, Showcase, and The Movie Network.

The Canadian Radio-television and Telecommunications Commission (CRTC) requires all television services in Canada to broadcast a minimum percentage of Canadian content, both during the day and during primetime.

=== United States networks and stations ===
In the U.S., the three traditional commercial television networks (ABC, CBS, and NBC) provide prime-time programs for their affiliate stations to air from 8:00 p.m. to 11:00 p.m. Eastern/Pacific Monday-Saturday and 7:00 p.m to 11:00 p.m. Eastern/Pacific on Sunday (with schedules in the Central and Mountain time zones starting one hour earlier). Most stations procure other programming, often syndicated, outside of prime time hours. Fox and The CW do not provide programming for the last hour of prime time; as a result, many affiliates of both networks air local news at that time. Ion Television, and MyNetworkTV also do not provide the same amount of network programming as so-called traditional networks, and utilize schedules that are heavily composed of reruns. Sinclair Broadcast Group operates the largest network of local television stations, reaching about 24% of U.S. households. Trinity Broadcast Network, or TBN, runs the world's largest Christian television network, and owns twenty-three U.S. full-power television stations as well as 252 low-power stations serving smaller cities and rural areas. PBS is the U.S.'s public broadcaster.

Over the past thirty years, cable and satellite television have come to provide most homes with dozens or even hundreds of television services. Cable television was originally created to allow residents of weak-signal areas to benefit from a large, well-located common antenna. In the 1970s, premium services such as HBO, Showtime, and The Movie Channel used satellites to deliver movies to cable head-ends, who would re-distribute it to customers for an added charge. During the same period, it has seen the emergence of numerous specialty cable networks, such as CBN (now Freeform), CNN, ESPN (sports), Lifetime (women's programming), TLC, MTV, Nickelodeon (children's shows), VH-1, The Weather Channel, and others. The advent of digital compression technology in the 1990s, along with the rapidly growing popularity of direct-to-home satellite television allowed for content providers to pack more channels into a single satellite slot, and a number of new networks, especially those fulfilling certain niches, aimed at digital cable and satellite systems were established.

== See also ==
- Oldest television station
- Cable television by region
- List of cable television companies
- Satellite television by region
- List of satellite television companies
