= Wer wird Millionär? (Swiss game show) =

- Created by: Endemol
- Presented by: René Rindlisbacher; Claudio Zuccolini
- Country of origin: Switzerland

Original release
- Network: TV3
- Release: 27 March 2000 – 2001
- Network: 3+
- Release: 29 November – 13 December 2011

Wer wird Millionär? is a Swiss game show based on the original British format of Who Wants to Be a Millionaire?. It was hosted by René Rindlisbacher. The show was broadcast from 27 March 2000 to 2001. It was shown on the Swiss TV station TV3.

The main goal of the show was to win 1 million CHF by answering 15 multiple-choice questions correctly. There were three 'lifelines': fifty-fifty, phoning a friend, and asking the audience. The biggest prize won on the show was 500,000 CHF, won by Hans Frauchiger.

From 29 November to 13 December 2011, Swiss TV station 3+ resumed the show with slight changes: the lifeline 'ask the audience' was replaced by 'ask the experts' and the candidate needs to choose at the beginning of the game whether he plays the save or the risky variant. If he chooses the risky variant, he gets a fourth lifeline, 'switch the question', but loses the second guaranteed sum.

== Money tree ==
Payout structure
Question number	Question value	
Question number	2000–2001	2011
1	100 CHF	
2	200 CHF	
3	300 CHF	
4	500 CHF	
5	1,000 CHF	
6	2,000 CHF	
7	4,000 CHF	3,000 CHF
8	8,000 CHF	5,000 CHF
9	16,000 CHF	8,000 CHF
10	32,000 CHF	15,000 CHF
11	64,000 CHF	25,000 CHF
12	125,000 CHF	50,000 CHF
13	250,000 CHF	150,000 CHF
14	500,000 CHF	300,000 CHF
15	1,000,000 CHF	
