= René Rindlisbacher =

Swiss television presenter and comedian (born 1963)

René Rindlisbacher (born 27 April 1963) is a Swiss television presenter and comedian.

== Biography ==
Rindlisbacher originally did a commercial apprenticeship and was trained as a bricklayer. He had his national breakthrough as a comedian together with Stefan Schmidlin as one half of the comedy duo 'The Schmirinskis'.

From 1995 to 2001, Rindlisbacher hosted the Saturday night show Top of Switzerland. He was also host of Wer wird Millionär?, the Swiss version of Who Wants to be a Millionaire? on TV3. Since 2005, he has been seen in the TV sketch show Edelmais & Co. He also in the reality TV show The Match.

From late 2005 to early 2006, Rindlisbacher was a candidate of the SF quiz show PISA – Kampf der Kantone ("Clash of the cantons") representing the canton of Zürich. He was the best celebrity contestant in each of the three episodes in which he participated and finally won the title of "Most Clever canton in Switzerland" for Zürich. In mid-2011, Rindlisbacher became the presenter of the show Millionen-Falle.

Rindlisbacher is married and has two children.
