= Elefantenrunde =

Television debate format

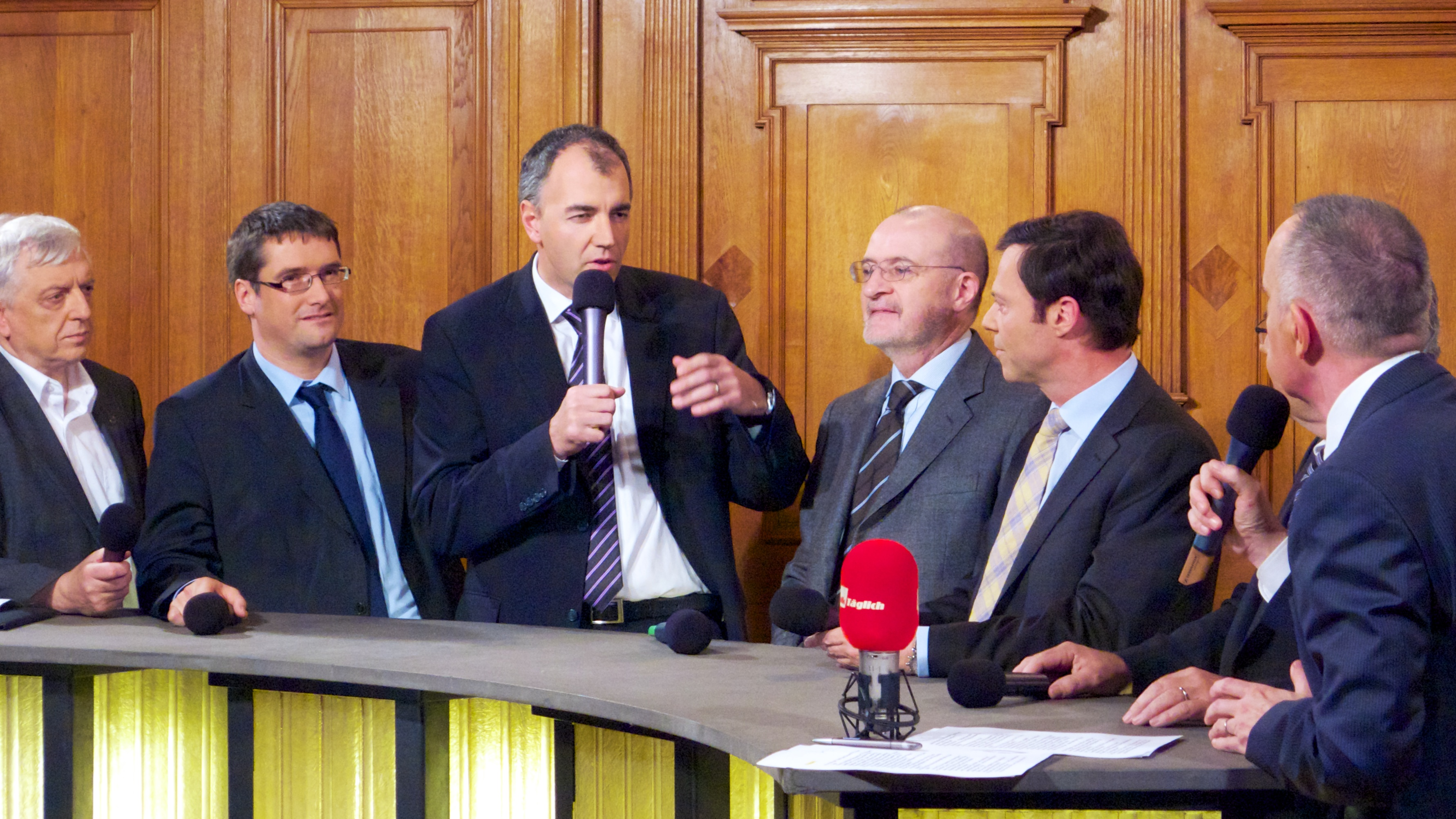
Elefantenrunde of the Swiss party presidents in the lead up to the parliamentary elections of 2011. From left to right: Ueli Leuenberger (Greens), Christian Levrat (SP), Christophe Darbellay (CVP), Fulvio Pelli (FDP.Die Liberalen), Christoph Mörgeli (SVP, on behalf of Toni Brunner), Hans Grunder (BDP, behind the moderator Markus Gilli).

Elefantenrunde, literally "Elephants' round-table", is a German language term for a television debate in which the leaders of parties with representation in parliament participate. The term originates in Germany and derives from the "weightiness" of the debates' participants and the significance of the event. The word was subsequently adopted in Austria and Switzerland and is currently in use there, but has no uniformly agreed meaning.

== Germany ==
Since 1969, televised debates with the leading politicians of the parties in the Landtag and Bundestag have traditionally taken place before elections on the public broadcast channels ARD and ZDF.

Elefantenrunden has taken place before parliamentary elections since the 1969 federal election. These were broadcast live by ARD and ZDF simultaneously, with the official name of Drei Tage vor der Wahl (Three Days before the Election), before the 1972, 1976, 1980, 1983, and 1987 elections. There were no time limits and in 1976 the Elefantenrunde went on for more than four hours. A first attempt to broadcast an Elefantenrunde in 1965 failed. The Elefantenrunde was no longer broadcast as part of the election campaign after 1987, since the serving Bundeskanzler Helmut Kohl refused to participate in such a debate before the federal elections in 1990, 1994, and 1998. Since the 2002 election, there has been a televised debate between the leaders of the two main parties, the CDU and the SDP, which was unsuccessfully challenged in the Federal Constitutional Court. Alongside this, at the 2005 election, there was a debate broadcast on ARD with the leaders of all the parties in the Bundestag a few days before the election, which (unlike the broadcasts up to 1987) had time limits and took a back seat to the debate between the two major parties in public consciousness. A similar broadcast was planned for the 2009 election, but was cancelled due to the refusal of candidates from the CDU and the SPD to participate. On the Sunday before the 2013 election, a 90 minute long "Berliner Runde" (Berlin Round-table) was broadcast in parallel by ARD and ZDF instead, in which prominent supporters of the parties in the Bundestag took part instead of the actual candidates.

Elefantenrunde continue to take place after federal elections, in which most of the part leaders analyse the course of the election; these are broadcast by ARD and ZDF simultaneously. Similar round-tables also take place after Landtag elections, with the general secretaries or federal leaders of the parties. These are also broadcast by the two national broadcasters. The official name of the broadcast is the "Berliner Runde" (until 1999, the "Bonner Runde").

Finally, informal, private, round tables of the party leaders of the coalition parties in Helmut Kohl's cabinet (the CDU, the CSU and the FDP), were also referred to as "Elefantenrunde". These meetings were typical of the governing style of Helmut Kohl and his so-called Kitchen Cabinet. They were held before important decisions and clarified important issues outside of the official platforms (the Bundestag, Vermittlungsausschuss, etc.). These meetings attracted broad attention in the media, but they declined in significance after the death of Franz Josef Strauss.

=== Memorable rounds ===
==== 2005 ====
In the elephant round programme on election night 2005 featuring all party leaders, Chancellor Gerhard Schröder (SPD), in a memorable performance, insisted he had won although the SPD had fallen behind the CDU/CSU and accused the moderators of having “an intellectual problem”. The chancellor then declared to Angela Merkel "Under her leadership she will never get a coalition with my party" and insisted that the CDU and CSU should be treated as separate parties. His performance during the programme was criticized by the media, CDU/CSU and the FDP as "shocking", "egocentric", "arrogant" and "bizarre". The Berliner Kurier newspaper headline asked if Schröder was “intoxicated by his victory or did he have one glass of wine too many?”. Schröder himself later called his behavior “suboptimal” but denied he was drunk.

==== 1987 ====
In the pre-election round, Jutta Ditfurth of the Greens, who was the first female participant was seen by the other all-male party leaders of being too aggressive. Martin Bangemann of the FDP went on to tell Ditfurth “Being polemical makes you ugly.” It was said that Kohl decided not to attend another pre-election debate again in subsequent elections because of Ditfurth’s spirited performance.

==== 1976 ====
The debate saw Franz-Josef Strauss of the CSU, CDU's Helmut Kohl and then-Chancellor Helmut Schmidt of the SPD in a four-hour "grudge match" full of withering insults. Strauss and Kohl went on the attack while Schmidt, cigarette in hand and appearing to drink alcohol was described as having brushed them off with unapologetic arrogance.

== Switzerland ==
In Switzerland, a meeting of the leaders of the four parties of the Swiss Federal Council (SP, CVP, FDP, and SVP) is traditionally called an "Elefantenrunde". After the announcement of referendum and election results, Schweizer Fernsehen and Schweizer Radio DRS hold an Elefantenrunde which is widely reported, at which the party leaders analyse the causes and consequences of the results. Elefantenrunde also often occur on the political television show, Arena.

The part leaders of the glp and BDP took part in the Elefantenrunde for the first time after the announcement of the results of the 2011 elections, as a result of the changed party landscape resulting from the massive losses of the five largest parties (SVP, SP, FDP, CVP, Greens) and growth of the new glp and BDP parties. In more recent years, the Greens have also been invited from time to time.

== Austria ==
In Austria, the term became established only with the 2006 general election. It was used to refer to a televised discussion with the party leaders of all the parties then in Parliament, which took place a few days before the election. This discussion was broadcast on ORF and was preceded by a debate between the leaders of the two main parties, which was referred to as a "TV-Konfrontation," "Wahlkonfrontation" or "TV-Duell" (TV Debate, Election Debate, or TV Duel). In 2006 the official title of the final round table of the election campaign was Diskussion der Spitzenkandidaten – Die Elefantenrunde (Leading Candidates' Discussion: The Elefantenrunde).

Since the candidates of other political groups participating in the legislative elections are excluded from this programme, they have participated in their own broadcast debate since 2006 which was informally referred to as the Mückenrunde (Mosquitos' round-table) in 2006 and the Ameisenrunde (Ants' Round-table) in 2008 - in addition to the official title.

Discussions with all the candidates in the presidential election were referred to as "Elefantenrunde" for the first time in 2016.

== Bibliography ==
- Karl-Rudolf Korte: Deutschlandpolitik in Helmut Kohls Kanzlerschaft. Regierungsstil und Entscheidungen 1982-1989. Stuttgart 1998, ISBN 3-421-05090-2
- Stichwort "TV-Konfrontation", in Oswald Panagl / Peter Gerlich (ed.): Wörterbuch der politischen Sprache in Österreich. Wien 2007, ISBN 3-209-05952-7
