= TV3 (Swiss TV channel) =

- Country: Switzerland
- Headquarters: Zürich, Switzerland

Programming
- Language: German

Ownership
- Owner: Tamedia; SBS Broadcasting Group

History
- Launched: 6 September 1999; 27 years ago
- Closed: 23 December 2001; 24 years ago (2 years, 108 days)
- Replaced by: 3+

TV3 Switzerland was a Swiss German-language private television channel, broadcast from 6 September 1999 to 22 December 2001. It was jointly owned by media company Tamedia and the now defunct SBS Broadcasting Group. TV3 aired notable shows such as Big Brother, Expedition Robinson, Popstars, The Bar and Wer wird Millionär?, as well as international films and TV series.

The channel faced financial problems since the beginning; in 2000, it had to suspend its nightly news bulletin, then in 2001, it was revealed that Tamedia alone could not keep the channel as being financially viable, given that local adaptations of international formats were too costly to produce and the channel was kept under high debts. The decision was taken to close the channel in November 2001, alongside Tele 24, a private news channel. The closure kept German-speaking Switzerland bereft of a national generalist network for another five years, when 3+ opened.

== History ==
SBS Broadcasting Group filed a permit for a national private cable channel on 3 July 1998.

TV3 activated its website in April 1999 and was operational from 6 September. It was a joint venture between SBS and Tamedia AG; both parties owned half of the shares. At launch, it broadvast for 18 ½ hours a day, three of which were given to local content. However, the bulk of the schedule consisted of American films and series, such as ER and NYPD Blue. The target audience consisted largely of viewers age 18-49 who often watched German networks available on cable.

On 17 March 2000, TV3 announced the cancellation of its 20-minute newscast News um 7; 35 staff were fired. Two smaller newscasts shown at 7:50pm and 10:50pm replaced it, lasting six minutes each.

In September 2000, it started airing the Swiss version of Big Brother, coinciding with an IPO of its parent company Tamedia. However, it was beset by criticism from a Tages-Anzeiter (also owned by Tamedia) column criticizing the format and its staff and accusing it of censorship. It was reported that in its first weekend, 408,000 viewers watched it. In October, it received a multi-year agreement with Universal Pictures.

On 1 January 2001, it stopped receiving payments from SBS Broadcasting Group, making Tamedia AG the sole owner. The closure was announced on 21 November 2001. For its final week, it aired a package of movies, culminating with the last program seen, Titanic, at 8pm on 22 December. The founders believed that the cause for its closure was over excessive debts stemming from the high cost of producing programs.

After its closure, speculations emerged in the press that SRF could acquire the rights to TV3's programs. In April 2002, two Austrians, Hanno and Erwin Soravia, bought the TV studios and announced the creation of Kanal 1, which would be seen nationwide on cable. On 31 August 2006, 3+, considered to be its successor, began.

== See also ==
- Television in Switzerland
