= Big Brother (Swiss TV series) =

- Also known as: Big Brother Schweiz
- Genre: Reality television
- Created by: John de Mol Jr. Endemol
- Developed by: John de Mol Jr. Endemol
- Presented by: Eva Wannemacher (2); Daniel Fohrler (1)
- Country of origin: Switzerland
- Original language: German
- No. of seasons: 2

Original release
- Network: TV3
- Release: 3 September 2000 – 13 May 2001

Big Brother Schweiz is a Swiss version of the reality television franchise Big Brother. The Swiss version is based on the original Dutch Big Brother produced by Endemol. It has had a total of two seasons and has no plan to have another series.

The first season aired in 2000 and was a huge hit with Swiss audience, so the sophomore season followed soon. Although not being as successful as the original series, season 2 proved to be a rating hit as well. However TV3, the station that aired Big Brother, was shut down at the end of 2001 due to financial problems and as of now, no other Swiss channel has shown interest in reactivating the show.

However, Big Brother Germany has since allowed members of the German-speaking public of Switzerland to audition for its version of Big Brother and following 2001 has aired in Switzerland.

== Details ==
Series	Language	Launch Date	Finale Date	Days	Housemates	Winner	The prize	Presenter
Big Brother Schweiz 1	Swiss German	3 September 2000	17 December 2000	106	13	Daniela Hahn	150,000.- CHF (170,000.- USD)	Daniel Fohrler
Big Brother Schweiz 2	Swiss German	28 January 2001	13 May 2001	106	14	Christian Ponleitner	150,000.- CHF (170,000.- USD)	Eva Wannemacher

== Season 1 ==
Season 1 of Big Brother Schweiz was produced by Endemol. It ran from September 3, 2000, to December 30, 2000. Lasting a total of 106 days. During the first season there were seven evictions and a total of three voluntary exits. Some highlights of the season were the voluntary exit by Nadim immediately following Mashas eviction he claimed that he could not live in the house without Masha. After the eviction of Remo the world saw a first an all-female final three. Daniela ultimately won the season becoming the second ever female winner of Big Brother. She won 150,000 CHF (US$170,000).

=== Contestants ===
Housemates	Age	Residence	Occupation	Entered	Exited	Status
Daniela Hahn	29	Aarau	Clerk	Day 1	Day 106	Winner
Conny Meier	28	Zürich	Beauty Advisor	Day 1	Day 106	Runner-up
Janine	23	Zürich	Secretary	Day 1	Day 106	3rd Place
Remo	26	Schwyz	Policeman	Day 1	Day 99	7th Evicted
Ruedi	25	Lucerne	Insurance adviser	Day 64	Day 85	6th Evicted
Olivier Kapp	31	Basel	Lawyer	Day 1	Day 71	5th Evicted
Masha Strübin	22	Basel	Model	Day 36	Day 57	4th Evicted
Nadim Diethelm	25	Bern	Information scientist	Day 1	Day 57	Walked
Fabian Bürkli	30	Lucerne	DJ	Day 22	Day 43	3rd Evicted
Stefan Dettling	37	Zug	Businessman	Day 1	Day 33	Walked
Tanja Ammann, "Tanisha"	25	Frauenfeld	Singer	Day 1	Day 29	2nd Evicted
Miguel Engewald	28	Zürich	Artist	Day 1	Day 20	Walked
Evelyne	25	Zürich	Field service	Day 1	Day 15	1st Evicted

=== Nominations Table ===
	Week 2	Week 4	Week 6	Week 8	Week 10	Week 12	Week 14	Week 15	
Daniela	Nadim, Stefan	Tanisha, Stefan	Nadim, Remo	Masha, Nadim	Conny, Remo	Remo, Ruedi	Remo, Janine	Winner (Day 106)	
Conny	Evelyn, Tanisha	Tanisha, Janine	Janine, Nadim	Masha, Nadim	Daniela, Olivier	Janine, Ruedi	Remo, Janine	Runner-Up (Day 106)	
Janine	Nadim, Stefan	Olivier, Stefan	Olivier, Fabian	Masha, Nadim	Conny, Olivier	Conny, Ruedi	Conny, Remo	Third place (Day 106)	
Remo	Daniela, Miguel	Daniela, Janine	Daniela, Fabian	Conny, Daniela	Conny, Olivier	Conny, Ruedi	Daniela, Janine	Evicted (Day 99)	
Ruedi	Not In; House				Exempt	Conny, Remo	Evicted (Day 85)		
Olivier	Evelyn, Janine	Tanisha, Janine	Fabian, Conny	Masha, Janine	Conny, Janine	Evicted (Day 71)			
Nadim	Miguel, Janine	Tanisha, Janine	Daniela, Conny	Daniela, Conny	Walked (Day 57)				
Masha	Not In; House		Exempt	Conny, Daniela	Evicted (Day 57)				
Fabian	Not In; House	Exempt	Daniela, Olivier	Evicted (Day 43)					
Stefan	Daniela, Janine	Tanisha, Janine	Walked (Day 33)						
Tanisha	Conny, Daniela	Conny, Stefan	Evicted (Day 29)						
Miguel	Conny, Stefan	Walked (Day 20)							
Evelyn	Conny, Stefan	Evicted (Day 15)							
Nominated For Eviction	Daniela, Evelyn, Janine, Nadim, Stefan	Janine, Tanisha	Daniela, Fabian	Conny, Daniela, Masha, Nadim	Conny, Olivier	Conny, Ruedi	Janine, Remo	Conny, Daniela, Janine	
Walked	none	Miguel	Stefan	Nadim	none				
Evicted	Evelyn; 32% to evict	Tanisha; 69.27% to evict	Fabian; 68.03% to evict	Masha; 57% to evict	Olivier; 64.98% to evict	Ruedi; 65.59% to evict	Remo; 76.4% to evict	Janine; 11.83% (out of 3) to win	Conny; 41.66% to win
Evicted	Evelyn; 32% to evict	Tanisha; 69.27% to evict	Fabian; 68.03% to evict	Masha; 57% to evict	Olivier; 64.98% to evict	Ruedi; 65.59% to evict	Remo; 76.4% to evict	Daniela; 58.44% to win	

== Season 2 ==
=== Contestants ===
Housemates	Age	Residence	Occupation	Entered	Exited	Status
Christian	21	Bern	Bricklayer	Day 1	Day 106	Winner
Remo	22	Schwyz	Cook	Day 1	Day 106	Runner-up
Theresa	25	St. Gallen	Wirtin	Day 32	Day 106	3rd Place
Michèle	26	Basel	Nurse	Day 62	Day 106	4th Place
Nino	37	Bern	Hairdresser	Day 32	Day 99	7th Evicted
Eugene	31	Bern	Musician	Day 1	Day 85	6th Evicted
Kiyomi	21	Zürich	Employee	Day 12	Day 71	5th Evicted
Raphael	24	Solothurn	Journalism student	Day 1	Day 57	4th Evicted
Sabrina	30	Zürich	Business guide	Day 1	Day 43	3rd Evicted
Tiana	24	Basel	Commercial employees	Day 1	Day 36	Walked
Patrizia	29	St. Gallen	Bank employee	Day 1	Day 29	2nd Evicted
Patrick	32	Zürich	Managing director	Day 1	Day 29	Walked
Sara	23	Bern	Administrative woman official	Day 1	Day 15	1st Evicted
Laila	21	Zürich	Bank employee	Day 1	Day 8	Walked

=== Nominations Table ===
	Week 2	Week 4	Week 6	Week 8	Week 10	Week 12	Week 14	Week 15	
Christian	Patrick, Sabrina	Patrick, Tiana	?	?	No nominations	Michele, Theresa	?	Winner (Day 106)	
Remo	Sara, Patrick	Patrizia, Patrick	?	?	No nominations	Michele, Theresa	?	Runner-up (Day 106)	
Theresa	Not In; House		?	?	No nominations	Eugene, Remo	?	Third place (Day 106)	
Michele	Not In; House				No nominations	Eugene, Remo	?	Fourth place (Day 106)	
Nino	Not In; House		?	?	Kiyomi, Theresa	Michele, Eugene	?	Evicted (Day 99)	
Eugene	Raphael, Sara	?	?	?	No nominations	Michele, Theresa	Evicted (Day 85)		
Kiyomi	Not In; House	?	?	?	No nominations	Evicted (Day 71)			
Raphael	Patrick, Sabrina	?	?	?	Evicted (Day 57)				
Sabrina	Christian, Remo	?	?	Evicted (Day 43)					
Tiana	Patrizia, Sabrina	Patrizia, Remo	Walked (Day 36)						
Patrick	Christian, Raphael	?	Walked (Day 29)						
Patrizia	Remo, Sara	?	Evicted (Day 29)						
Sara	Patrizia, Remo	Evicted (Day 15)							
Laila	Walked (Day 8)								
Nominated For Eviction	Christian, Patrick, Patrizia, Remo, Sara	Patrick, Patrizia, Tiana	Kiyomi, Raphael, Sabrina	Kiyomi, Raphael, Theresa	Kiyomi, Nino, Theresa	Eugene, Michele, Theresa	Michele, Nino, Remo	Christian, Michele, Remo, Theresa	
Walked	Laila	Patrick	Tiana	none					
Evicted	Sara; 29.2% to evict	Patrizia; 45% to evict	Sabrina; 44.2% to evict	Raphael; 50.4% to evict	Kiyomi; 60% to evict	Eugene; 56.6% to evict	Nino; 47.5% to evict	Michele; 4.2% (out of 4)	Theresa; 14.4% (out of 4)
Evicted	Sara; 29.2% to evict	Patrizia; 45% to evict	Sabrina; 44.2% to evict	Raphael; 50.4% to evict	Kiyomi; 60% to evict	Eugene; 56.6% to evict	Nino; 47.5% to evict	Remo; 40.5% (out of 2)	Christian; 59.5% to win

== Statistics ==
- Total number of days on air: 212 days
- Total number of housemates: 27 Housemates
- Total number of housemates that walked: 6 Housemates
- Total number of ejections : 0 Housemates
