= Markus Gilli =

Swiss television presenter, journalist and radio host

Markus Peter Gilli (born 30 May 1955 in Zürich) is a Swiss radio and television journalist and member of the governing board of the television arm of AZ Medien. Gilli began his career in 1980 on Radio 24, which was the first Swiss private radio station. He was employed there as an editor and presenter until 1999 and then as a head editor and program director.

In 1992 and 1994, Markus Gilli won the Tele-Prize for a 24-hour report on the Zurich drug scene at the Platzspitz, as well as the Zurich radio prize for a report on the heavy impact of that drug scene on the residents of the surrounding areas of Zurich. In August 1997, Gilli took over as editor and presenter of the talk-show, SonnTalk on Tele 24 and TeleZüri.

From 1999 until 2014, he was program editor and editor-in-chief at TeleZüri. Since 1 April 2014, he has been editor in chief of the various channels of AZ Medien (TeleZüri, TeleBärn, Tele M1, TV24). He also presented SonnTalk and TalkTäglich on TeleZüri. In 2013 he was honoured with the "Journalist of the Year" award.
