= 2005 German federal election =

- 18 September 2005

All 614 seats in the Bundestag, including 16 overhang seats 308 seats needed for a majority
- Registered: 61,870,711 ▲0.7%
- Turnout: 48,044,134 (77.7%) ▼1.4pp

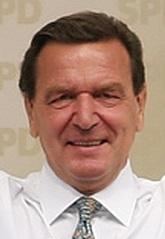

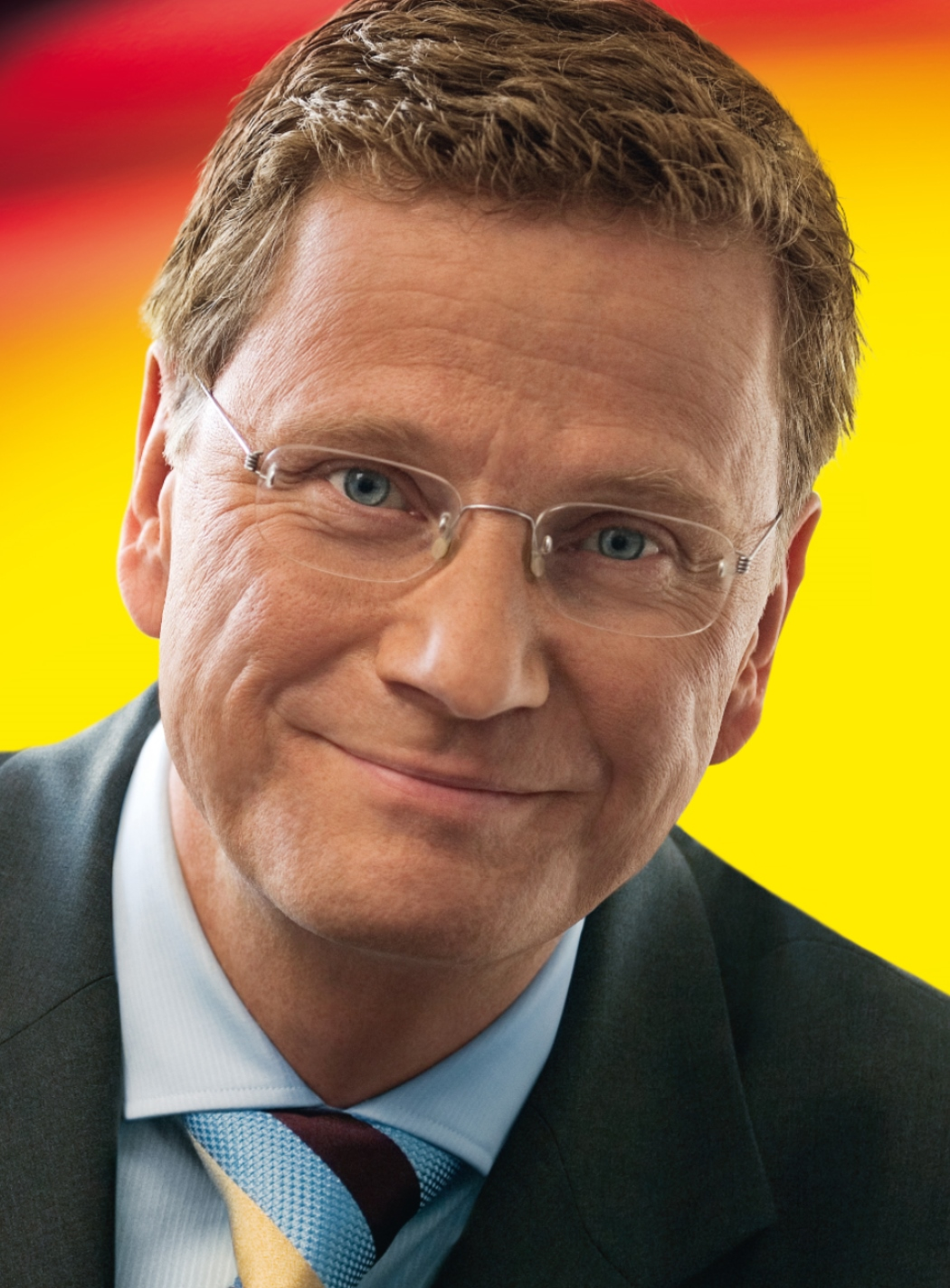

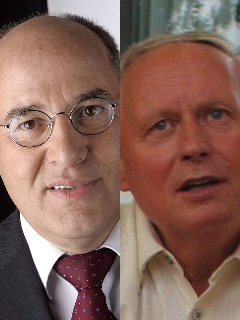

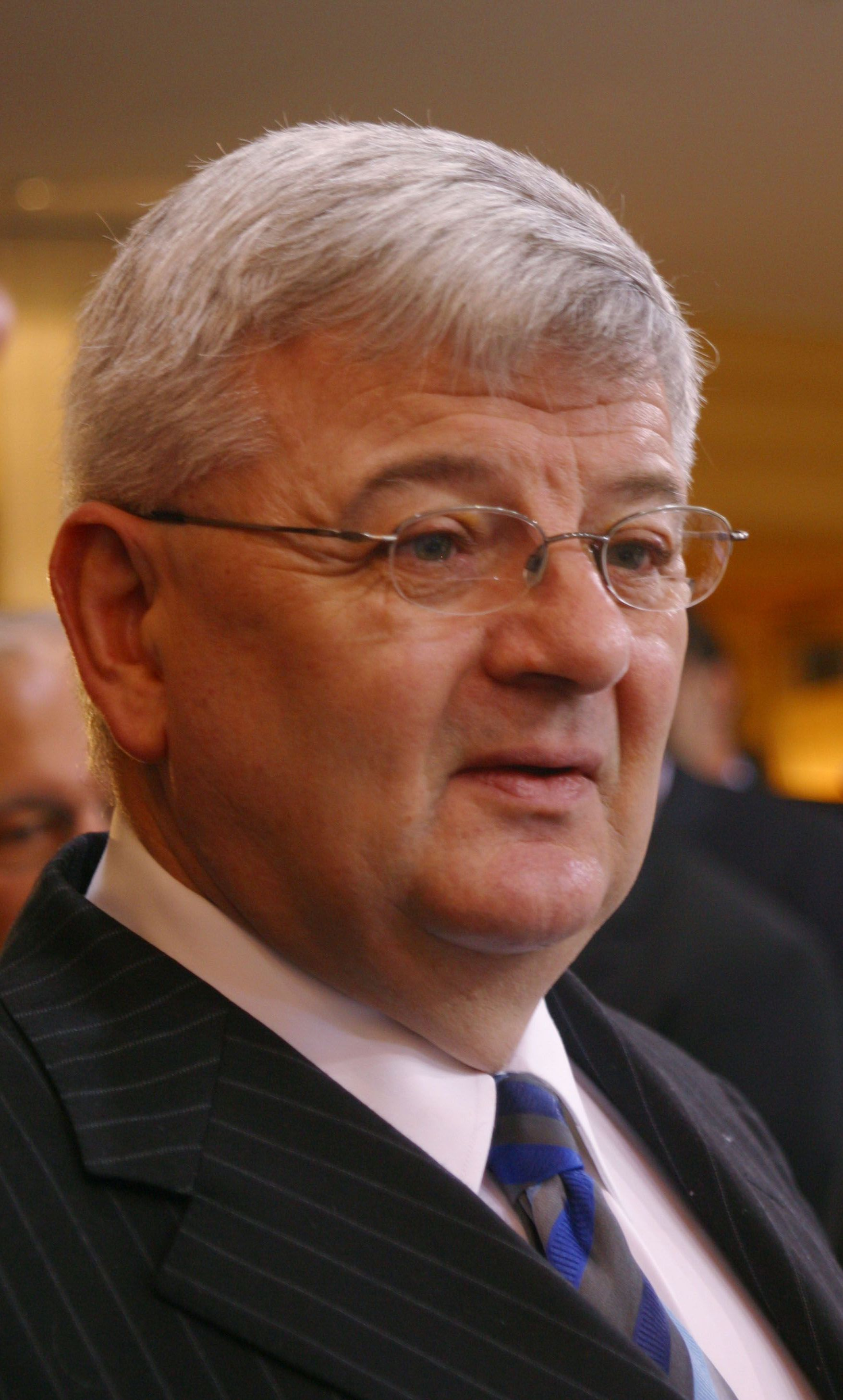
	First party	Second party	Third party
Candidate	Angela Merkel	Gerhard Schröder	Guido Westerwelle
Party	CDU/CSU	SPD	FDP
Last election	38.5%, 248 seats	38.5%, 251 seats	7.4%, 47 seats
Seats won	226	222	61
Seat change	▼22	▼29	▲14
Popular vote	16,631,049	16,194,665	4,648,144
Percentage	35.2%	34.2%	9.8%
Swing	▼3.3 pp	▼4.3 pp	▲2.4 pp
	Fourth party	Fifth party
Candidate	Gregor Gysi & Oskar Lafontaine	Joschka Fischer
Party	The Left.PDS	Greens
Last election	4.0%, 2 seats	8.6%, 55 seats
Seats won	54	51
Seat change	▲52	▼4
Popular vote	4,118,194	3,838,326
Percentage	8.7%	8.1%
Swing	▲4.7 pp	▼0.5 pp
- Results of the election. The main map shows constituency winners, and results for the proportional list seats are shown in the bottom left.
Government before election
Second Schröder cabinet
SPD–Greens
Government after election
First Merkel cabinet
CDU/CSU–SPD

A federal election was held in Germany on 18 September 2005 to elect the members of the 16th Bundestag. The snap election was called after the government's defeat in the North Rhine-Westphalia state election, which caused them to intentionally lose a motion of confidence to trigger an early federal election. The outgoing government was a coalition of the centre-left Social Democratic Party of Germany (SPD) and Alliance 90/The Greens, led by federal chancellor Gerhard Schröder. The election was originally intended for the autumn of 2006.

The opposition Christian Democratic Union of Germany (CDU), with its sister party the Christian Social Union in Bavaria (CSU), started the campaign with a strong lead over the SPD in opinion polls. The government was generally expected to suffer a major defeat and be replaced by a coalition of the CDU/CSU and the liberal Free Democratic Party (FDP), with CDU leader Angela Merkel becoming chancellor. However, the CDU/CSU ultimately lost vote share compared to its 2002 result, falling to 35%. The SPD suffered losses but finished just one percentage point behind the CDU/CSU, winning 34%. Exit polls showed clearly that neither the SPD–Green nor CDU/CSU–FDP coalitions had won a majority of seats in the Bundestag. The FDP placed third on just under 10% of votes, its best result since 1990, while the Greens suffered small losses. The major stumbling block to a parliamentary majority was the new Left Party, led by Gregor Gysi and former SPD chairman Oskar Lafontaine, which won 8.7% of votes and 54 seats. The CDU/CSU and SPD both rejected cooperation with the Left Party.

Both Schröder and Merkel claimed victory, but the formation of a new government required careful negotiations, as no conventional arrangement could achieve a majority. The CDU/CSU sought talks with the Greens, but were unable to find common ground. Discussions ultimately began for a grand coalition between the CDU/CSU and SPD. On 10 October, officials from both parties indicated that negotiations had concluded successfully and that they would form a coalition government with Angela Merkel as chancellor. The Bundestag met on 22 November and Merkel was elected chancellor, with 397 votes in favour.

== Background ==
On 22 May 2005, state elections were held in North Rhine-Westphalia, the most populous state of Germany, where the SPD had led the state government continuously since 1966. The election saw the government of Minister-President Peer Steinbrück defeated. It also resulted in the opposition CDU and FDP claiming a majority in the Bundesrat, the upper house of the federal legislature. The same day, federal Chancellor Schröder and SPD Bundestag group leader Franz Müntefering announced they would seek early federal elections. They claimed the North Rhine-Westphalia result was indicative of a lack of public confidence in the federal government.

Early federal elections may only be held under two circumstances: if the Bundestag rejects a candidate for chancellor three times, or if a motion of confidence in the government fails to achieve an absolute majority in the Bundestag. In either case, the president may, at request of the chancellor, dissolve the Bundestag and order new elections. The latter method had been utilised on two occasions previously, in 1972 and 1983, by incumbent governments intentionally failing motions of confidence. Schröder became the third chancellor to do this, with a motion of confidence on 1 July failing with 151 votes in favour, 296 against, and 148 abstentions. Schröder called on SPD members to abstain from the vote, which would allow him to fall short of the required threshold. President Horst Köhler then dissolved the Bundestag and scheduled new elections.

== Contesting parties ==
The table below lists parties represented in the 15th Bundestag:

Name			Ideology	Lead candidate	2002 result	
Name			Ideology	Lead candidate	Votes (%)	Seats
SPD		Social Democratic Party of Germany; Sozialdemokratische Partei Deutschlands	Social democracy	Gerhard Schröder	38.5%	251 / 603
CDU/CSU	CDU	Christian Democratic Union of Germany; Christlich Demokratische Union Deutschlands	Christian democracy	Angela Merkel	29.5% (Note: The sum of the CDU and CSU votes was 38.5%.)	248 / 603
CDU/CSU	CSU	Christian Social Union in Bavaria (Note: The Christian Democratic Union and the Christian Social Union of Bavaria call themselves sister parties. They do not compete against each other in the same geographical regions and they form one group within the Bundestag.); Christlich-Soziale Union in Bayern	Christian democracy	Angela Merkel	9.0% (Note: CSU received 58.6% in Bavaria. It only fields candidates in Bavaria, where the CDU does not field candidates.)	248 / 603
Grüne		Alliance 90/The Greens; Bündnis 90/Die Grünen	Green politics	Joschka Fischer	8.6%	55 / 603
FDP		Free Democratic Party; Freie Demokratische Partei	Classical liberalism	Guido Westerwelle	7.4%	47 / 603
Linke		The Left Party.PDS; Die Linkspartei.PDS	Democratic socialism	Gregor Gysi & Oskar Lafontaine	4.0%	2 / 603

== Campaign ==
The CDU/CSU nominated Angela Merkel for chancellor, the first time in German history that one of the two larger parties had nominated a woman for this position. The CDU presented a platform involving increasing the pace and scope of economic deregulation in Germany and pursuing cuts in income tax and public spending (many commentators have compared Merkel with Margaret Thatcher). The CDU began the campaign with a 21% lead over the SPD and confidence in Merkel's victory led the prime minister of the United Kingdom, Tony Blair, to meet with her ahead of Chancellor Schröder during a visit to Berlin in June.

The SPD had the goal of maintaining the current deregulation agenda. They added to their election program some minor corrections such as broadening the financing base of the healthcare system and the proposal of a 3% additional tax for people with annual incomes above 250,000 euro (after the governing coalition earlier in 2005 cut the highest income tax rate from 48.5% to 42%).

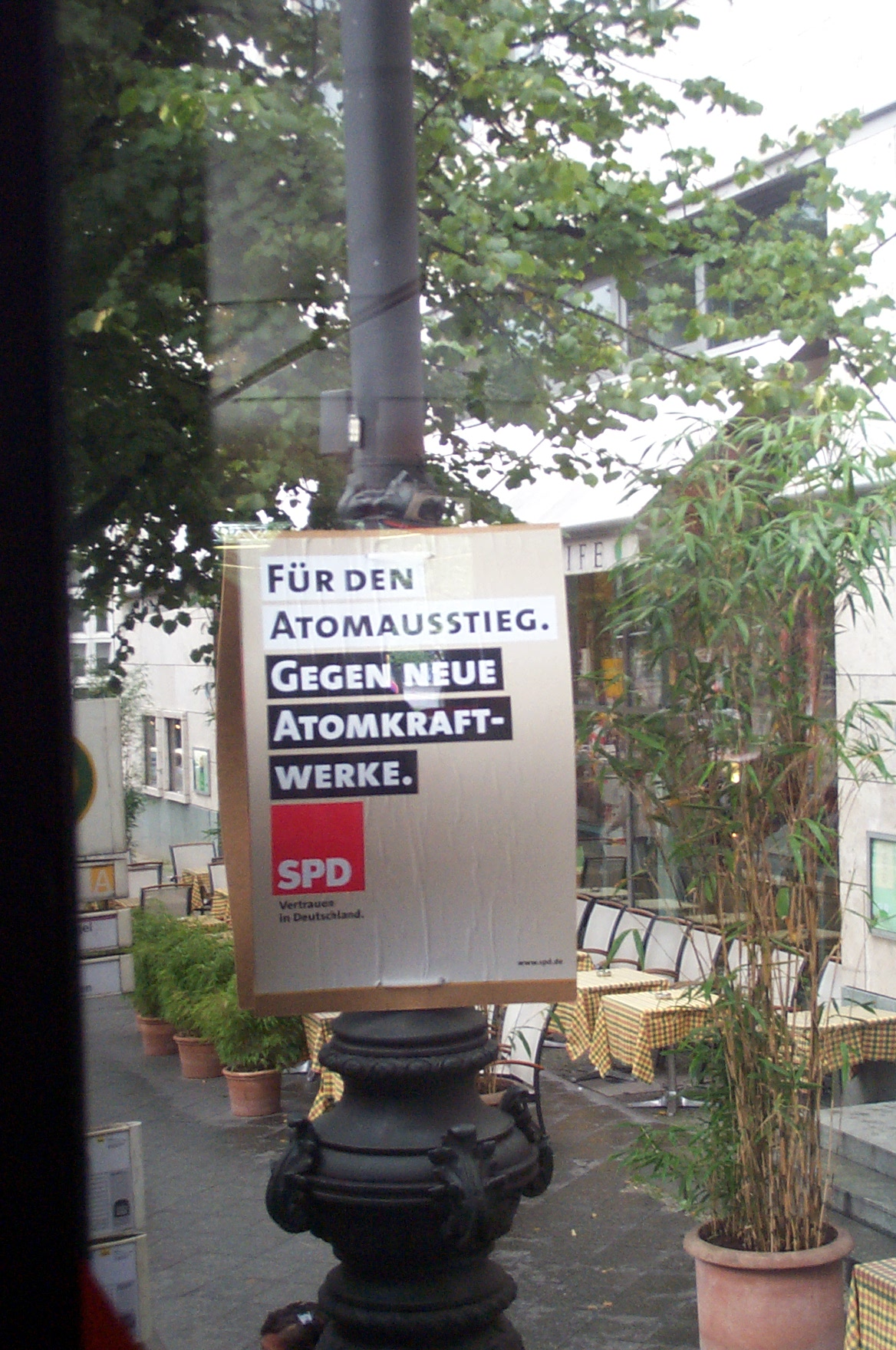
Election placard of the Social Democratic Party

The Greens decided on their program in July 2005. Compared to their previous federal election program, they increased the emphasis on economics and labour-market politics. For the first time this topic came before the classical green topic of environmental politics in the program. In general, the program moved slightly to the left; including stating the necessity for changes to some existing red-green governmental policies.

The FDP announced its election program before any other party, publishing it on 24 July. It called for strong saving measures in public spending and more room for local negotiation between employees and employers, as opposed to central control by trade-union officials.

The leaders of the left wing Party of Democratic Socialism (the "PDS") agreed to let candidates of the recently founded Electoral Alternative for Labor and Social Justice (the "WASG") run on their party list, leaving open the possible future option of a merger between the two parties. In agreeing to this the WASG stipulated that the PDS rename itself as the Left Party. The WASG, with its front-runner Oskar Lafontaine (a former SPD leader), formed from breakaway elements within the SPD, angered at that party taking a "neoliberal" direction in economic reforms. The general membership had already approved this measure and awaited to hear from the PDS party convention to agree as well. If successful this could lead to a further erosion of the SPD's strength, as the PDS never made inroads in the former West Germany (it lineally succeeded the former governing communist party, Socialist Unity Party of Germany, of the former German Democratic Republic), while the WASG had its base in western Germany and could garner substantial votes there.

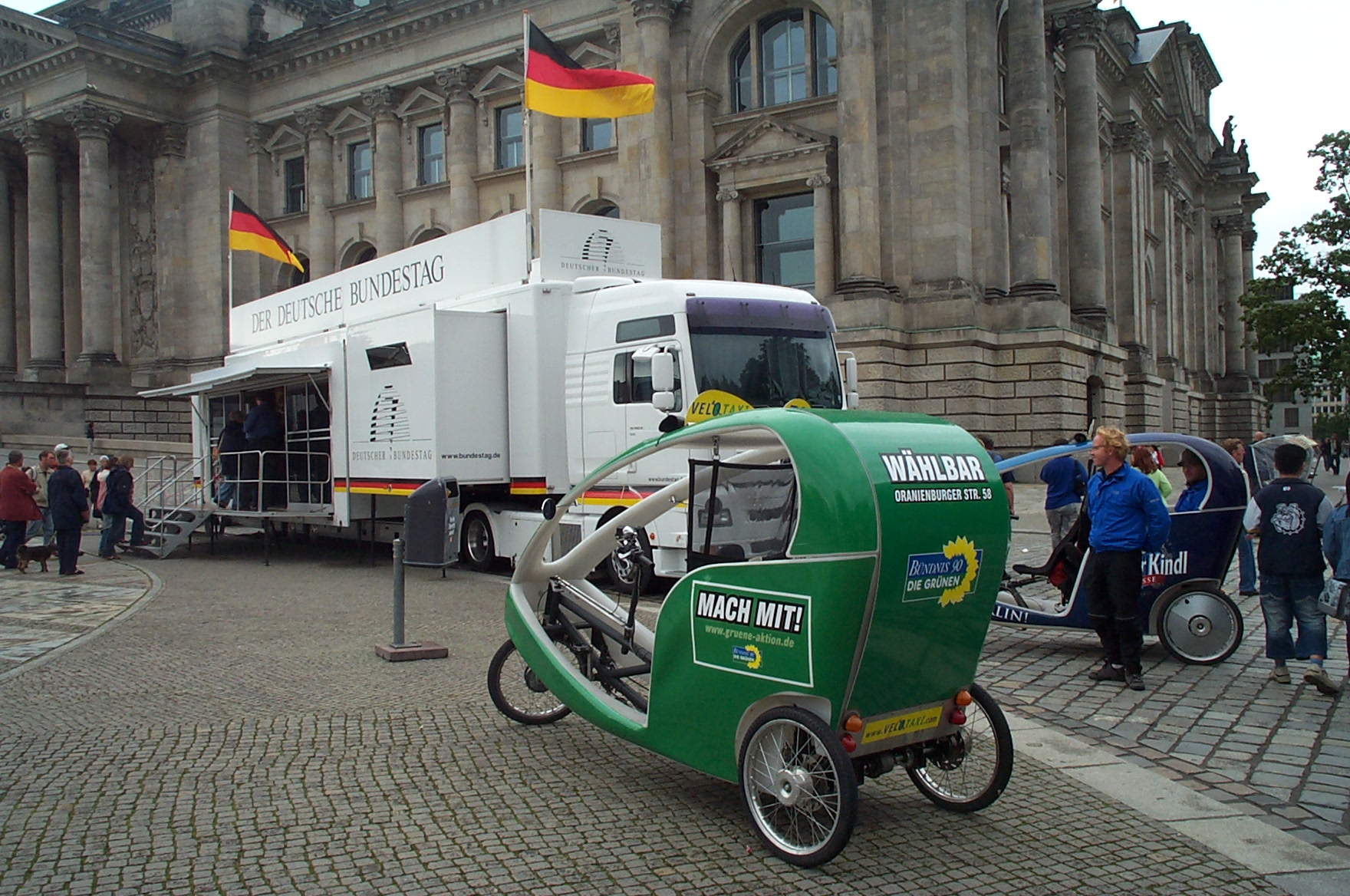
A bicycle-taxi (velotaxi) in front of the German Reichstag building in Berlin with the Greens livery

Two of Germany's small far-right parties, the National Democratic Party (NPD) and the German People's Union (DVU), announced that they would run on a common platform in this election, raising fears in the mainstream German political establishment that together they might succeed in gaining more than 5% of the national vote and thus in entering the Bundestag. Since German electoral law does not permit common lists of two or more parties, in practice the DVU did not enter the election, and members of that party appeared on the NPD list.

Early election polls during summer 2005 from 6 organizations showed a solid lead for the CDU/CSU with a share of the vote ranging between 41% and 43%, and the SPD trailing at between 32% and 34%. The polls further showed the FDP, a possible coalition partner for the conservatives, at between 6.5% and 8%, and the Greens, the current coalition partner for the SPD, between 6% and 8%. Most polls indicated a likely majority for a CDU/CSU-FDP coalition. As for other parties, those polls which explicitly included the PDS-WASG electoral alliance showed it above the 5% hurdle at between 7% and 8.5%. No poll showed any other parties, including far-right parties, near 5%, although far-right parties had in the past sometimes polled below their actual support due to unwillingness by voters to admit their support.

In early August, support for Angela Merkel declined considerably. Reasons for this included conflicts about the election program in and between the conservative parties (the CDU and the CSU), and arguments with their preferred coalition partner, the FDP, as well as embarrassing gaffes. At one point the media criticized Merkel for confusing net and gross income figures during a campaign speech. Following this, polls suggested that the CDU/CSU and FDP would only win 48% of votes between them, and thus would not be able to form a government. Further damage occurred when two prominent CDU/CSU candidates, Jörg Schönbohm and the CSU leader Edmund Stoiber, made insulting remarks about East Germans. These remarks not only alienated voters in Eastern Germany but also made some question the CDU/CSU's confidence in Merkel, as she herself grew up in the East.

However, polls carried out by the Süddeutsche Zeitung in late August showed the CDU/CSU/FDP bloc back up at 51% of the vote. Predictions suggested that the opposing bloc of incumbent Chancellor Gerhard Schröder's ruling Social Democrats, the Greens and the country's recently formed left-wing Left Party (PDS/WASG alliance) would win a combined total of only 46%. The leaders of the SPD and the Greens, Schröder and Fischer, as well as the Left Party's front-runner Gregor Gysi said they opposed the idea of a "red-red-green" coalition. With polls remaining so close, speculation increased that (as in the elections of 1994, 1998 and 2002) a small number of overhang seats might significantly impact the election results.

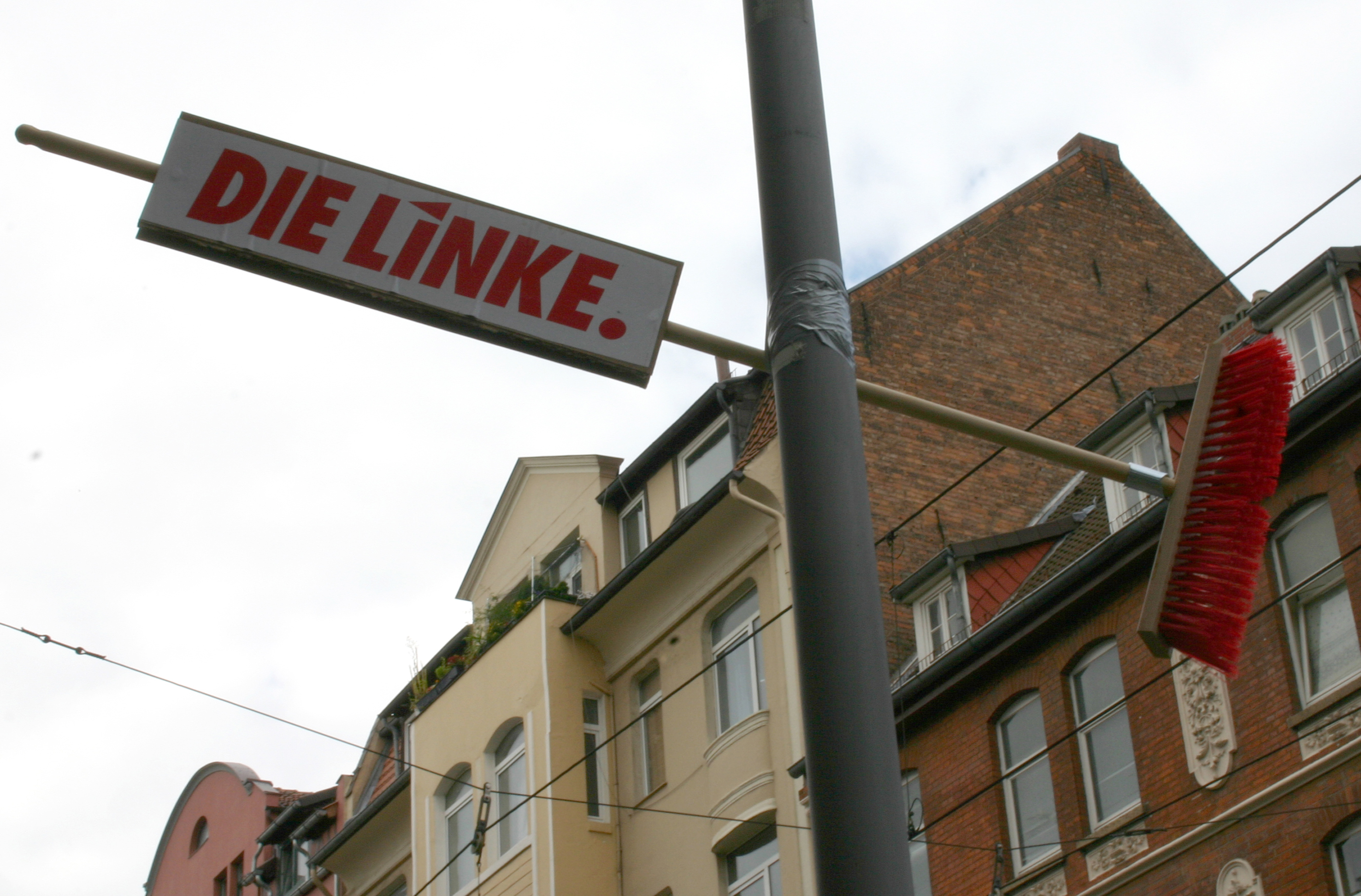
Left Party election placard

On Sunday 4 September, Schröder and Merkel met in a head-to-head debate which was broadcast by four of Germany's major private and public television networks. Although most commentators gave the initial edge to Merkel, polls soon showed that the general public disagreed and ranked Schröder the clear winner. Later analysis suggested that Merkel's support for a flat-tax proposal by Paul Kirchhof, the shadow Finance Minister, further undermined her credibility on economic affairs and gave the impression that the CDU's economic reforms would only benefit the very rich.

Midweek polls showed the SPD clawing their way upwards by a few percentage points although the combined CDU/CSU and FDP votes tended to remain 1 to 2 percentage points ahead of those for the left-wing parties combined. On the eve of the election, the CDU enjoyed a 9% lead over the SPD (42% and 33% respectively), albeit with neither party likely to have enough seats (even with their preferred coalition partners) to form a government. Merkel's personal popularity (consistently below that of her party) had climbed back up to 40%, from a low of 30% while Schröder's had reached a peak of 53% (consistently exceeding that of his party). However, polls also showed that even at this late stage, a quarter of German voters had not yet decided how to vote and that these undecided voters could decide the final result if they turned out to vote. With polls still so close, the parties broke with tradition and continued campaigning on the Saturday before the election and on election day itself. While pundits focused on the likelihood of a grand coalition, the CDU suggested that the SPD might consent to forming a coalition with the new Left Party.

== Opinion polls ==
Polling for the 2005 German federal election

All major opinion polling published in the week prior to the election indicated a clear victory for the CDU/CSU, with a result over 40%. The discrepancy between forecasts and the actual result led to criticism of the polling firms. The error was attributed to factors including the large number of undecided voters (up to 40% ahead of the election) and the increasing inaccuracy of traditional telephone-based survey methods.

Polling firm	Fieldwork date	Sample size	SPD	Union	Grüne	FDP	Linke	Others	Lead
2005 federal election	18 Sep 2005	–	34.2	35.2	8.1	9.8	8.7	4.0	1.0
Allensbach	10–15 Sep 2005	1,682	32.5	41.5	7.0	8.0	8.5	2.5	9.0
Forsa	12–16 Sep 2005	2,004	32–34	41–43	6–7	7–8	7–8	−	7–11
Emnid	9–12 Sep 2005	~2,000	33.5	42.0	7.0	6.5	8.0	3.0	8.5
GMS	7–10 Sep 2005	1,008	33	42	8	8	8	3	9
TNS Forschung	6–7 Sep 2005	1,000	34	41	7	6.5	8.5	3	7
Forschungsgruppe Wahlen	6–8 Sep 2005	1,299	34	41	7	7	8	3	7
2002 federal election	22 Sep 2002	–	38.5	38.5	8.6	7.4	4.0	3.0	0.01

== Vote ==
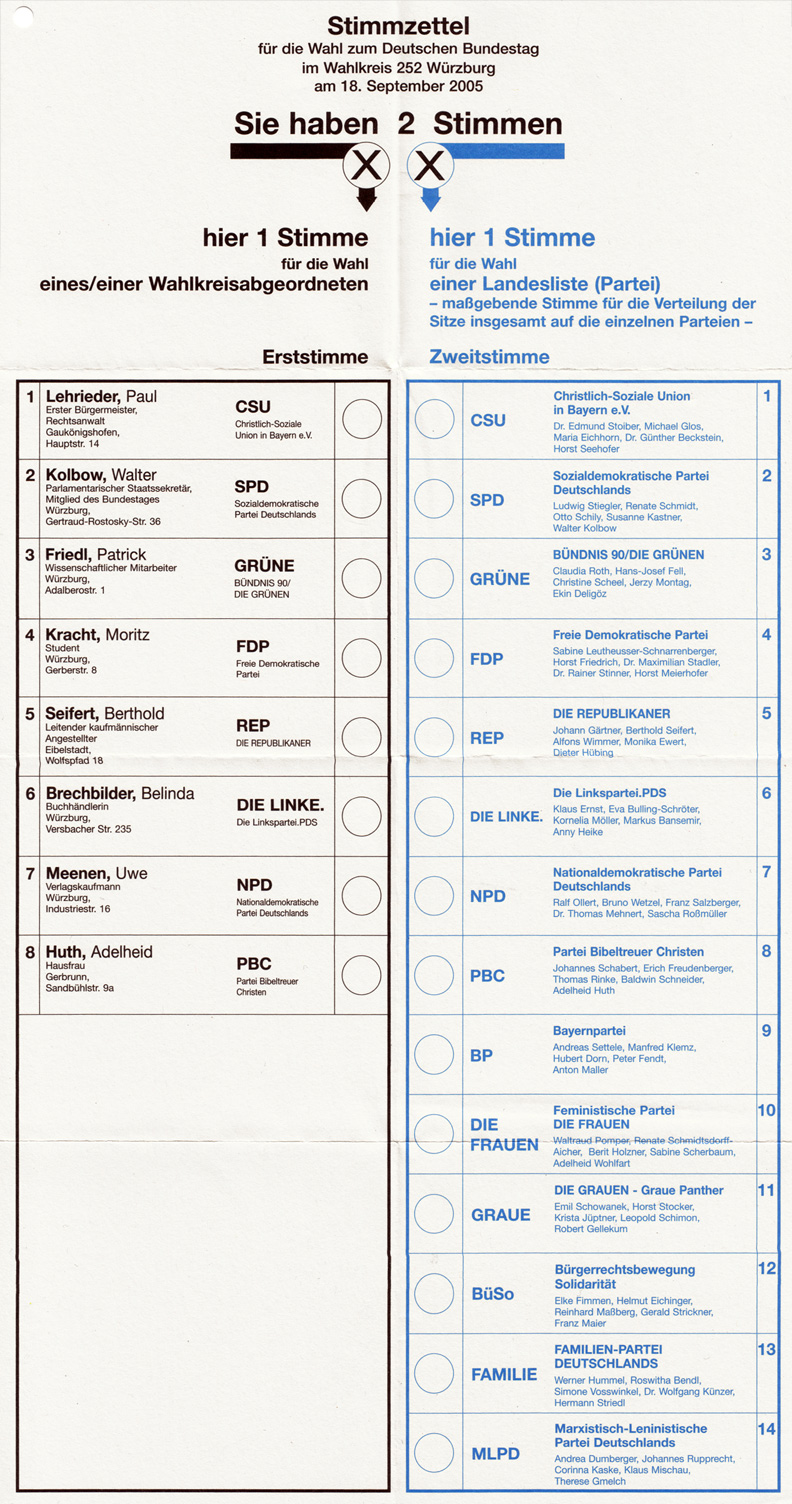
Ballot for electoral district 252, Würzburg. Constituency vote on left, party list vote on right.

Germany went to the polls on 18 September 2005. Voters in one constituency in Dresden had to wait until 2 October to vote in order to allow the reprinting of ballot-papers after the death of the National Democratic Party candidate on 8 September.

Soon after voting ended, it became clear that the CDU/CSU (the "Union") had narrowly edged out the SPD. However, neither of the two likely coalitions (SPD-Greens and CDU/CSU-FDP) could achieve a Kanzlermehrheit – the support of the majority of members of the Bundestag required to elect a chancellor. This meant that Germany had a hung parliament as no coalition could hold an overall parliamentary majority. Exit polls for both the ARD and the ZDF television networks showed the CDU/CSU on 35%, the SPD on 34%, the FDP on 10%, the Left Party on 9% and the Greens on 8%; a Forsa poll differed slightly, predicting 36% for the CDU/CSU and 8% for the Left Party. Early seat projections suggested that the CDU/CSU and the SPD had virtually tied in the count for seats in the Bundestag. The exit polls and projections proved broadly accurate in the preliminary results released on 19 September and in the final results published on 7 October.

The SPD/Green coalition's number of seats fell from 306 seats (in a house of 603), to 273 seats (in a house of 614) while the opposition, the CDU/CSU-FDP coalition's number of seats fell from 295 seats to 286 seats. Both potential coalitions fell far short of the 308 seats required for a majority in this Bundestag. The Left Party and the FDP overtook the Greens, previously Germany's third most-popular party since 1994. The FDP, with almost 10% of the vote, scored its best result since the 1990 federal election, regaining its status as the Federal Republic's third party, which it had enjoyed throughout the history of West Germany and maintained in the first post-German reunification election. Some analysts believe that the rise in the FDP vote came as a result of tactical voting by CDU-CSU voters hoping to prevent a grand coalition by buttressing the Free Democrats. Of the parties that failed to secure the 5% needed to attain seats in the Bundestag, the National Democratic Party performed best, winning 1.6% of the list vote and 1.8% of the constituency vote.

The 2005 election was the last one until 2021 where the SPD won all single-member constituency seats in Saxony-Anhalt, Saarland as well as Brandenburg and the last time where they won any single-member constituency seats in Saxony-Anhalt. Only in the 2021 election, at the end of the Merkel era, would the SPD sweep all constituencies in Saarland and Brandenburg again and gain seats in Saxony-Anhalt.

== Results ==
Parliamentary districts won by each party

Party	Party-list			Constituency			Total seats	+/–
Party	Votes	%	Seats	Votes	%	Seats	Total seats	+/–
Social Democratic Party	16,194,665	34.25	77	18,129,100	38.41	145	222	−29
Christian Democratic Union	13,136,740	27.78	74	15,390,950	32.61	106	180	−10
Free Democratic Party	4,648,144	9.83	61	2,208,531	4.68	0	61	+14
The Left Party.PDS	4,118,194	8.71	51	3,764,168	7.98	3	54	+52
Alliance 90/The Greens	3,838,326	8.12	50	2,538,913	5.38	1	51	−4
Christian Social Union	3,494,309	7.39	2	3,889,990	8.24	44	46	−12
National Democratic Party	748,568	1.58	0	857,777	1.82	0	0	0
The Republicans	266,101	0.56	0	38,678	0.08	0	0	0
The Grays – Gray Panthers	198,601	0.42	0	6,340	0.01	0	0	0
Family Party	191,842	0.41	0	76,064	0.16	0	0	0
Human Environment Animal Protection Party	110,603	0.23	0	7,341	0.02	0	0	0
Party of Bible-abiding Christians	108,605	0.23	0	57,027	0.12	0	0	0
Marxist–Leninist Party	45,238	0.10	0	16,480	0.03	0	0	0
Bürgerrechtsbewegung Solidarität	35,649	0.08	0	40,984	0.09	0	0	0
Bavaria Party	35,543	0.08	0	16,047	0.03	0	0	0
Feminist Party	27,497	0.06	0	1,327	0.00	0	0	0
Alliance for Health, Peace and Social Justice	21,350	0.05	0	570	0.00	0	0	New
Party for Social Equality	15,605	0.03	0				0	0
50Plus	10,536	0.02	0				0	New
Die PARTEI	10,379	0.02	0	6,923	0.01	0	0	New
Pro DM	10,269	0.02	0				0	0
Alliance for Germany	9,643	0.02	0	1,473	0.00	0	0	0
Anarchist Pogo Party	4,233	0.01	0	3,018	0.01	0	0	0
Centre Party	4,010	0.01	0	1,297	0.00	0	0	0
Party for a Rule of Law Offensive	3,338	0.01	0	5,401	0.01	0	0	0
Independents for Citizen-oriented Democracy				11,703	0.02	0	0	New
Humanist Party				2,029	0.00	0	0	0
German Social Union				1,655	0.00	0	0	0
Christian Centre				1,011	0.00	0	0	0
Human Economy Party				639	0.00	0	0	0
Statt Party				496	0.00	0	0	0
Independents and voter groups				118,130	0.25	0	0	0
Total	47,287,988	100.00	315	47,194,062	100.00	299	614	+11
Valid votes	47,287,988	98.43		47,194,062	98.23			
Invalid/blank votes	756,146	1.57		850,072	1.77			
Total votes	48,044,134	100.00		48,044,134	100.00			
Registered voters/turnout	61,870,711	77.65		61,870,711	77.65			

=== Results by state ===
Second vote (Zweitstimme, or votes for party list)

State results in %	SPD	CDU/CSU	FDP	LINKE	GRÜNE	NPD	all others
Baden-Württemberg	30.1	39.2	11.9	3.8	10.7	1.1	3.2
Bavaria	25.5	49.2	9.5	3.4	7.9	1.3	3.0
Berlin	34.3	22.0	8.2	16.4	13.7	1.6	3.7
Brandenburg	35.8	20.6	6.9	26.6	5.1	3.2	1.8
Bremen	42.9	22.8	8.1	8.4	14.3	1.5	1.9
Hamburg	38.7	28.9	9.0	6.3	14.9	1.0	1.1
Hesse	35.6	33.7	11.7	5.3	10.1	1.2	2.3
Mecklenburg-Vorpommern	31.7	29.6	6.3	23.7	4.0	3.5	1.1
Lower Saxony	43.2	33.6	8.9	4.3	7.4	1.3	1.3
North Rhine-Westphalia	40.0	34.4	10.0	5.2	7.6	0.8	2.0
Rhineland-Palatinate	34.6	36.9	11.7	5.6	7.3	1.3	2.6
Saarland	33.3	30.2	7.4	18.5	5.9	1.8	2.8
Saxony	24.5	30.0	10.2	22.8	4.8	4.8	2.9
Saxony-Anhalt	32.7	24.7	8.1	26.6	4.1	2.6	1.2
Schleswig-Holstein	38.2	36.4	10.1	4.6	8.4	1.0	1.3
Thuringia	29.8	25.7	7.9	26.1	4.8	3.7	2.0

SPD vote

CDU/CSU vote

FDP vote

Linke PDS vote

Green vote

NPD vote

==== Constituency seats ====
State	Total seats	Seats won				
State	Total seats	SPD	CDU	CSU	Linke	Grüne
Baden-Württemberg	37	4	33			
Bavaria	45	1		44		
Berlin	12	7	1		3	1
Brandenburg	10	10				
Bremen	2	2				
Hamburg	6	6				
Hesse	21	13	8			
Lower Saxony	29	25	4			
Mecklenburg-Vorpommern	7	4	3			
North Rhine-Westphalia	64	40	24			
Rhineland-Palatinate	15	5	10			
Saarland	4	4				
Saxony	17	3	14			
Saxony-Anhalt	10	10				
Schleswig-Holstein	11	5	6			
Thuringia	9	6	3			
Total	299	145	106	44	3	1

==== List seats ====
State	Total seats	Seats won					
State	Total seats	SPD	CDU	FDP	Linke	Grüne	CSU
Baden-Württemberg	39	19		9	3	8	
Bavaria	44	23		9	3	7	2
Berlin	10	1	4	2	1	2	
Brandenburg	11		4	1	5	1	
Bremen	2		1			1	
Hamburg	8		4	1	1	2	
Hesse	22	3	7	5	2	5	
Lower Saxony	33	2	17	6	3	5	
Mecklenburg-Vorpommern	6		1	1	3	1	
North Rhine-Westphalia	66	14	22	13	7	10	
Rhineland-Palatinate	16	6	2	4	2	2	
Saarland	6		3	1	2		
Saxony	19	5		4	8	2	
Saxony-Anhalt	13		5	2	5	1	
Schleswig-Holstein	11	4	2	2	1	2	
Thuringia	9		2	1	5	1	
Total	315	77	74	61	51	50	2

== Aftermath ==
Both Angela Merkel (CDU) and Gerhard Schröder (SPD) claimed victory and the chancellorship as the exit polls came in. It soon became clear that neither could form a majority government within the existing coalitions. Largely because of strong hostility between Schröder and Oskar Lafontaine, a former SPD chairman turned leader of the Left Party, the obvious left-wing coalition of the SPD, Greens and Left Party was not possible. However, both the CDU and SPD said that they would negotiate with all parties that had won seats except the Left Party, while the leaders of the Left Party rejected any possibility of participating in a coalition with either of the two main parties.

In the Elefantenrunde (elephant round) programme on election night featuring all party leaders, Schröder, in a memorable performance, insisted he had won on the basis of how far behind the SPD was in pre-election polls but managing to close the gap with the CDU/CSU to just one percent. Although the SPD still fell behind the CDU/CSU, he said "nobody but me is capable of building a stable coalition" and accused the moderators of having "an intellectual problem". The chancellor then declared to Merkel "Under her leadership she will never get a coalition with my party" and insisted that the CDU and CSU should be treated as separate parties. His performance during the programme was criticized by the media, CDU/CSU and the FDP as "shocking", "egocentric", "arrogant" and "bizarre". The Berliner Kurier newspaper headline asked if Schröder was "intoxicated by his victory or did he have one glass of wine too many?". Schröder himself later called his behavior "suboptimal" but denied he was drunk.

The exclusion of the Left Party reduced the possible coalitions to the following three arrangements:

- SPD, FDP and Greens (called the traffic light coalition, after the colours used to symbolize those parties: red, yellow and green, respectively). (The SPD governed in coalition with the Greens from 1998 to 2005, and in coalition with the FDP from 1969 to 1982.)
- CDU/CSU, FDP and Greens (called the Jamaica coalition after those parties' colours: black, yellow and green, respectively, which also feature in the Jamaican national flag). (The CDU/CSU governed in coalition with the FDP from 1949 to 1956, from 1961 to 1966 and from 1982 to 1998; but neither party had worked with the Greens in federal government.)
- CDU/CSU and SPD (a grand coalition). (The CDU/CSU and SPD previously governed in a grand coalition from 1966 to 1969.)

Despite some prominent members publicly blaming Merkel for its poor showing, the CDU/CSU confirmed her as leader on 20 September. On 22 September, following Schröder's election night comments, SPD members began musing that the political system should consider the CDU and the CSU as separate entities rather than as a single parliamentary faction. In such a scenario, the SPD would be the largest party in the Bundestag and thus, they argued, an SPD member should become chancellor in any grand coalition. One SPD legislator indicated he planned to introduce a motion in the Bundestag explicitly defining the CDU and the CSU as separate parties. The Greens rejected coalition with the CDU/CSU after talks broke down. The CDU/CSU pressed their case for the Chancellery after victory in the delayed vote in Dresden, and ahead of talks with the SPD; the SPD maintained their own claim, but Schröder indicated that he would step aside if his party wished it.

Finally, on 10 October, officials from the CDU/CSU and the SPD announced that negotiations to form a grand coalition had succeeded. Angela Merkel would become chancellor and the sixteen seats in the new cabinet (including the Chancellery) would go equally to each side, with the CDU/CSU and the SPD each having eight posts. The SPD would control eight ministries including the important roles of finance and foreign affairs, while the CDU/CSU would control six ministries as well as providing the chancellor and the Director of the Federal Chancellery (the Chancellor's Chief of Staff), who would also hold the position of Minister for Special Affairs. Gerhard Schröder would retire from politics.

Detailed negotiations on the formation of the new government continued into November, with Edmund Stoiber of the CSU withdrawing from the proposed cabinet to continue as Minister-president of Bavaria. All three parties held conferences on 14 November which voted to approve the deal. The majority of CDU/CSU and SPD delegates in the newly assembled Bundestag elected Merkel as chancellor on 22 November. 397 members of the Bundestag voted for Merkel, indicating that 51 members from one or more of the SPD, CDU or CSU do not support the coalition deal.

== See also ==
- List of political parties in Germany
