= 3+ (TV channel) =

- Country: Switzerland
- Headquarters: Zürich, Switzerland

Programming
- Language: German

Ownership
- Owner: CH Media
- Sister channels: 3+ Adrenalin; 3+ Crime; 3+ Emotion; 3+ Family; 3+ Focus; 3+ Movies; 3+ Series

History
- Launched: 31 August 2006; 20 years ago
- Replaced: TV3

Links
- Website: 3plus.ch

3+ is a Swiss German-language private television channel that launched on 31 August 2006 and is owned by CH Media. It is the first major private television channel in Switzerland since the closure of TV3 in 2001. Its founder is Dominik Kaiser, who led the network until the CH Media acquisition in 2019.

== History ==
The idea of a private TV channel in Switzerland at a national scale in German was first attempted with TV3 between 1999 and 2001, but due to high costs for producing programs, the channel had to close due to high debts.

On 11 January 2006, the Federal Council granted a national license to Dominik Kaiser as Elevator TV (tentative name). On 31 May, the channel was presented to the public under the new name 3+. Due for a September launch, it already sealed an agreement with Cablecom to distribute it over both its analog and digital cable networks, whereas on analog cable, it was set to take over ORF 2's frequency. From the beginning, it planned to create Swiss versions of international formats, as well as local sitcoms and a documentary program akin to Welt der Wunder. It also acquired a raft of Hollywood titles. It would also launch a second channel in early 2007 on digital providers.

3+ launched at 8pm on 31 August 2006. In order not to commit the same mistakes as the defunct private channels Tele 24 (1998–2001) and TV3 (1999–2001), most of the line-up consisted of American films and TV series. This strategy worked as it gained more ratings and, subsequently, ad revenue. Within its first ten years on air, it would spawn the creation of two sister channels (4+ and 5+) and would have 2,9 million viewers tuning in every month on average. In October 2019, CH Media acquired 3+, thus becoming Switzerland's largest private television group.

On 31 August 2026 (date of its twentieth anniversary), 3+ changed its logo and adopted it as an umbrella brand for CH Media's eight national TV channels.

== See also ==
- Television in Switzerland
