= Roger Schawinski =

Swiss journalist and entrepreneur born 1945

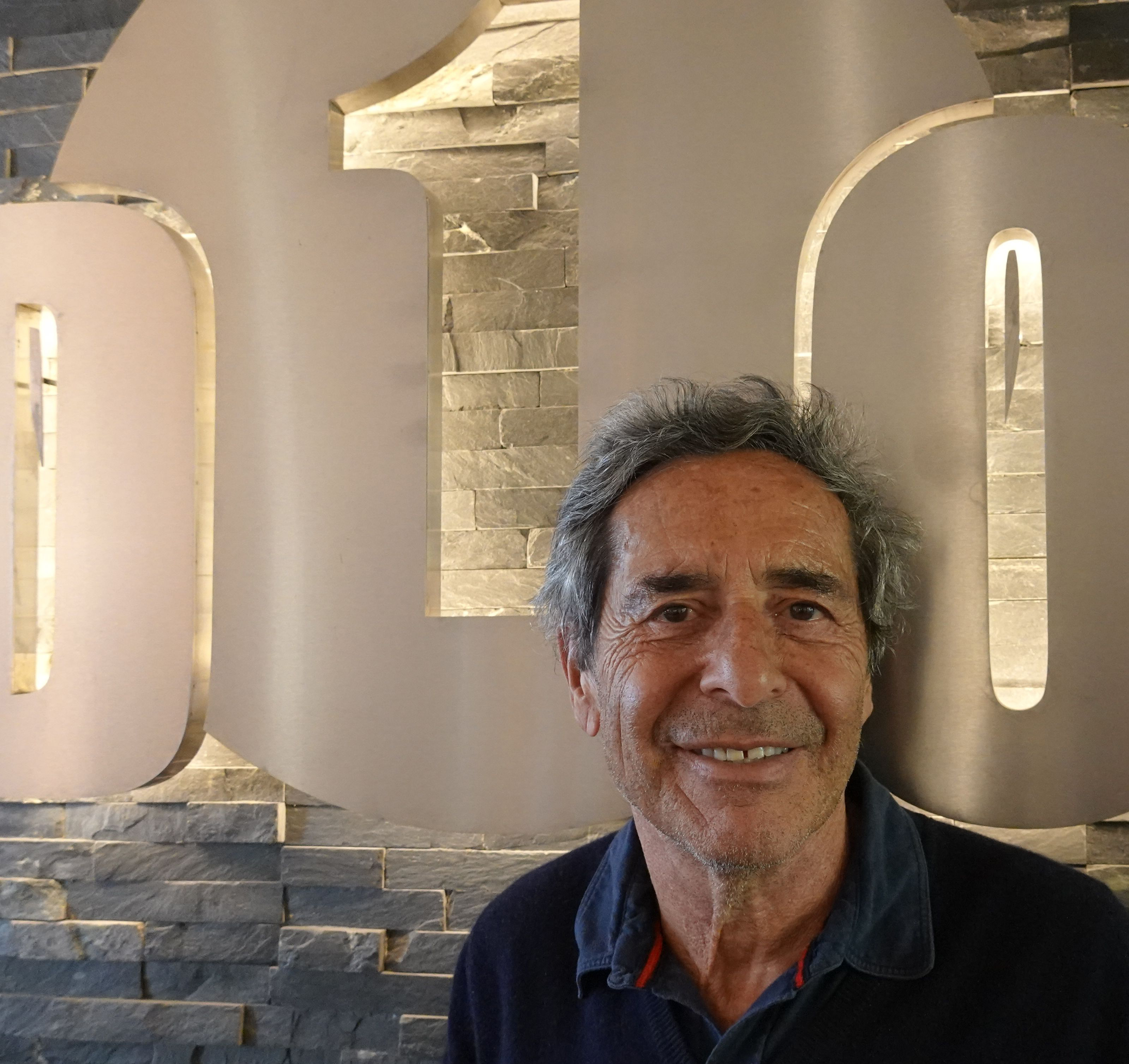
- Roger Schawinski
- Born: Roger Schawinski; June 11, 1945 (age 81); Zurich, Switzerland
- Citizenship: Switzerland (since 1946); Poland (until 1946)
- Education: University of St. Gallen; Central Michigan University (MBA)
- Occupations: Businessman; media pioneer; journalist
- Known for: Media pioneering, founding TeleZüri and Tele24, leading Sat1
- Spouses: Priscilla Colon (m. 1970; div. 1977) Ina Guiton (m. 1981; div. 1990) Gabriella Sontheim (m. 1996)
- Children: 3

Roger Schawinski (born 11 June 1945) is a Swiss businessman, media pioneer and journalist who is primarily known for creating the Swiss consumer watchdog program Kassensturz (English: "cash check"), founding several private TV and radio stations (namely TeleZüri and Tele24) as well as developing German-speaking Sat 1 TV station.

== Early life and education ==
Schawinski was born 11 June 1945 in Zurich, Switzerland, to Swiss-born Pole Abraham "Abri" Schawinski (né Szczawiński; 1916–1998), a tailor and peddler, and Marcelle Schawinski (née Tyber), who worked part-time as a salesperson. He has a younger sister, Jacqueline Schawinski (born 1947).

His paternal family was Ashkenazi Jewish and originally hailed from Kutno in Poland, arriving in Switzerland around 1914 fleeing poverty and antisemitism. His father was born the youngest of four children in Chur in Grisons. After the death of his grandfather they relocated to Zurich Wiedikon. His mother was a Swiss citizen of Russian-Jewish origin, who lost her citizenship upon marriage to a foreigner.

In 1946, the Schawinski family naturalized as Swiss citizens, and changed their name officially from Szczawiński to the germanized Schawinski. He initially completed commercial school and then completed the Swiss Matura. He then completed studies in economics at the University of St. Gallen and a Master of Business Administration at Central Michigan University.

== Career ==
He founded Switzerland's first commercial radio station, Radio 24 , and launched a nationwide television channel called Tele 24. In 2003, he gained international status when he joined the German television network Sat. 1 and became the managing director for three consecutive years. He earned a PhD in economics from University of St. Gallen. Schawinski pre-launched Radio 1 on 14 January 2008 and went on air with it on 17 March 2008. Radio 1 was the first radio station especially devoted to music and the taste for adults in their 30s–60s.

== Personal life ==
In 1970, he married Priscilla Colon, who originally was from Puerto Rico and whom he met during his exchange studies at Central Michigan University were they pursued MBA studies. In 1981, he married Ina Guiton, with whom he had two children, including astrophysicist Kevin Schawinski. With his current wife, Gabriella Sontheim, whom he married in 1996 he has one daughter.
