= 3+ Focus =

- Country: Switzerland
- Broadcast area: Switzerland
- Headquarters: Zürich, Switzerland

Programming
- Language: Swiss German
- Picture format: 576i (16:9 SDTV); 1080i (HDTV)

Ownership
- Owner: CH Media
- Sister channels: 3+ 3+ Adrenalin; 3+ Crime; 3+ Emotion; 3+ Family; 3+ Movies; 3+ Series

History
- Launched: 18 October 2013; 13 years ago
- Replaced: Tele 24
- Former names: S1 (2013–2026)

Links
- Website: www.3plus.ch/sender/3plus-focus

3+ Focus is a privately owned TV channel in German-speaking Switzerland. Originally founded as S1 in 2013, in its current format, it airs factual content.

== History ==
The channel was the brainchild of Hardy Lussi, former member of the SAT.1 Schweiz board of directors and member of the defunct private channel Tele24, and Mike Gut, who formerly worked at programming at SAT.1 Schweiz and ProSieben Schweiz. The plan was to create a purely Swiss private television channel, as the conditions (since the times of TV3 and Tele24) for such a service have improved significantly. The project was announced in April 2013. In addition, an output deal with ZDF was announced to supply the channel with an extensive library of German-language content.

Since the channel's beginning, and as of December 2016, the scenic views broadcast as part of Swissview were giving the channel healthy ratings.

== Programming ==
- Border Patrol
- Border Security: Australia's Front Line
- Pawn Stars
