= Nobuyuki Koga =

Japanese businessman (born 1934)

- 古賀 信行
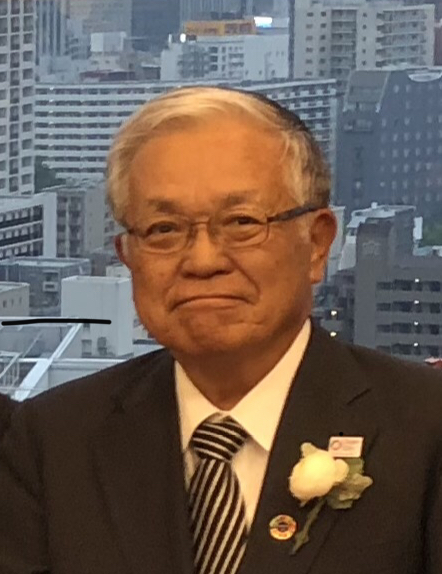
- Born: August 22, 1950 (age 76)
- Education: Tokyo University
- Occupations: CEO at Nomura Holdings, the Chairman of NHK,
- Years active: 1974 - incumbent

Nobuyuki Koga (古賀 信行, Koga Nobuyuki; born August 22, 1950) is a Japanese businessman and lobbyist, as well as the chairman of the Japanese public broadcaster NHK.

== Early life and education ==
Koga was born in Ōmuta, Fukuoka Prefecture.

He graduated from Japanese La Salle Academy in Kagoshima and then Tokyo University.

== Career ==
=== Nomura Securities ===
Koga joined Nomura Securities, working as the lobbyist to the Ministry of Finance.

In 1998, the Vice President of Nomura Securities was arrested for bribing the Minister of Finance but the case was dropped by the Public Prosecutors Office in Japan. At that time, there were only around 500 inspectors at the MOF.

In 2003, he was appointed as the president of the Nomura Holdings. From 2008 to 2024, he served as the Chairman of the Nomura Securities, and Nomura Holdings, as well as the Special Advisor and the Honorary Advisor of the Nomura Holdings.

In 2012, Nomura Securities was fined 300 million yen for leaking public offering information and insider trading.

In 2019, Koga lobbied Sanae Takaichi, Minister of Internal Affairs and Communications at that time as the representative of the Keidanren.

=== Chair of NKH ===
In 2024, Koga was appointed to the Executive Board of NHK by the National Diet, and elected chairman.
