= TeleBielingue =

- Country: Switzerland
- Broadcast area: Biel/Bienne
- Headquarters: Biel/Bienne

Programming
- Language(s): German, French

Ownership
- Owner: Bureau Cortesi, Editions W. Gassmann

History
- Launched: 15 March 1999

Links
- Website: https://web.telebielingue.ch/

TeleBielingue is a Swiss private television channel transmitted in the Biel/Bienne area. It transmits alternately in German and French language. The name is a portmanteau of Biel, the German name of the city, and bilingue, meaning bilingual in French. The channels claims to have 210,000 potential listeners, making it an important part of the local media market.

== History ==
TeleBielingue began broadcasts on 15 March 1999, over a year and half after receiving the broadcast licence from the Swiss OFCOM.

The channel was created as a partnership among some of the most important media groups in the region: Radio Canal 3, Bureau Cortesi and the publisher of the two most important newspapers in the region, both in French and German (Le Journal du Jura and Bieler Tagblatt respectively): W. Gassmann SA.

Today, Radio Canal 3 is no longer a shareholder.
