= Federal Office of Communications =

Swiss federal agency

Coordinates: 46°58′25″N 7°28′48″E

- (in German) Bundesamt für Kommunikation (in French) Office fédéral de la communication (in Italian) Ufficio federale delle comunicazioni

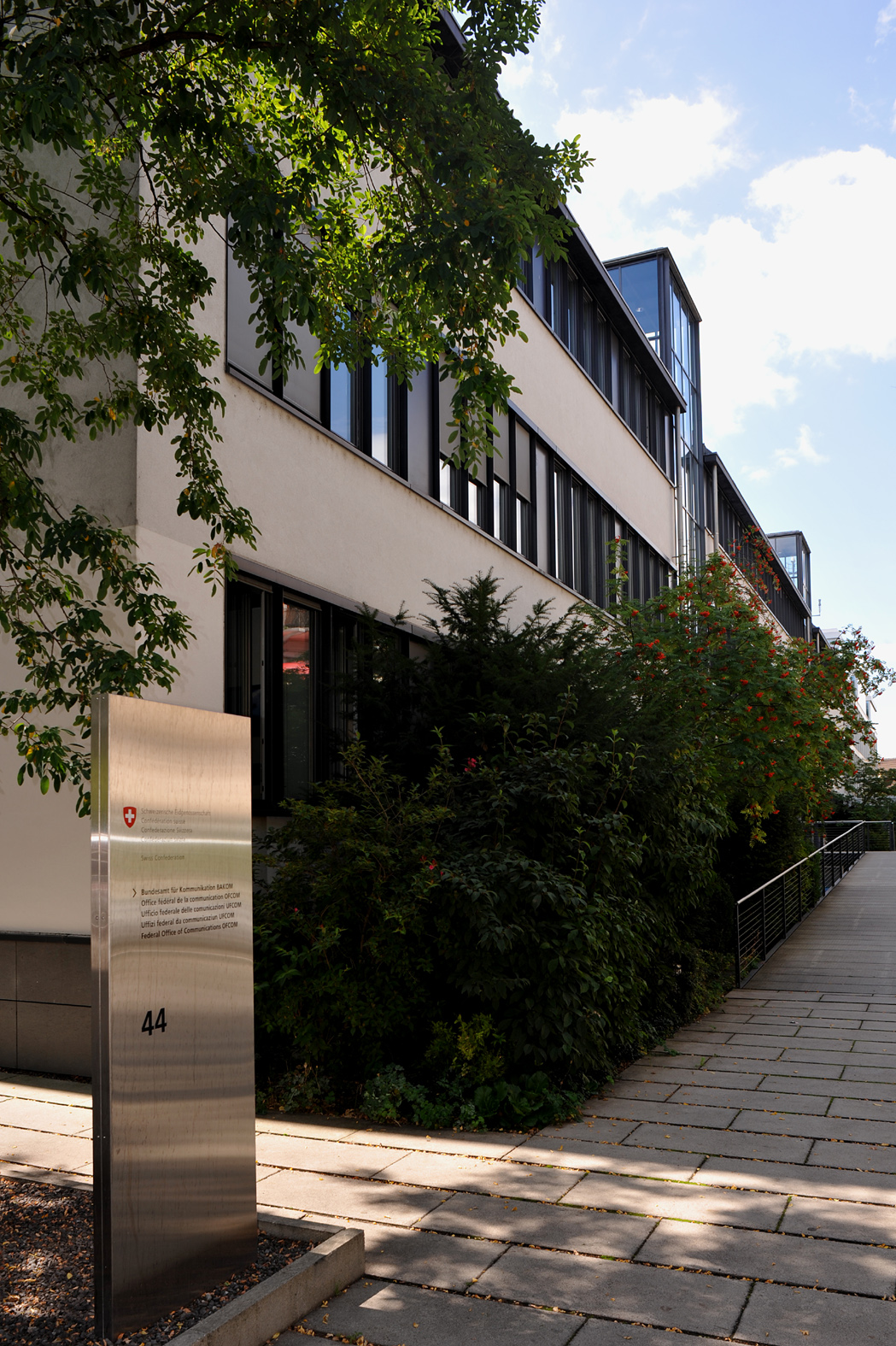

Agency overview
- Formed: 1992
- Jurisdiction: Federal administration of Switzerland
- Headquarters: Biel/Bienne
- Minister responsible: Albert Rösti, Federal Councillor
- Parent agency: Federal Department of Environment, Transport, Energy and Communications
- Website: www.bakom.admin.ch

The Federal Office of Communications (OFCOM) (Note: German: Bundesamt für Kommunikation, BAKOM; French: Office fédéral de la communication, OFCOM; Italian: Ufficio federale delle comunicazioni, UFCOM) is a Swiss federal office that deals with issues relating to telecommunications, broadcasting and postal services in Switzerland.

Created in 1992, the office is attached to the Federal Department of the Environment, Transport, Energy and Communications (DETEC), and is based in Biel/Bienne.

The OFCOM's activities are governed by the Swiss Telecommunications Act (TCA), the Federal Act on Radio and Television (RTVA) and the Federal Postal Act.

== Comparable authorities ==
- in France, the Autorité de Régulation des Communications Electroniques et des Postes (ARCEP) and the Regulatory Authority for Audiovisual and Digital Communication (ARCOM)
- in Belgium, the Institut belge des services postaux et des télécommunications (IBPT) and the Conseil supérieur de l'audiovisuel (CSA)
- in Canada, the Canadian Radio-television and Telecommunications Commission (CRTC)
- in the United States, the Federal Communications Commission
- in the United Kingdom, the Ofcom

== Directors ==
- Since July 2020: Bernard Maissen
- 2014-2020: Philipp Metzger
- 2005-2013: Martin Dumermuth

== Full-time positions since 2007 ==
Raw data

Source: "Federal Finance Administration FFA: Data portal".
