= Keith Sintay =

American animator

- Born: February 22; Michigan
- Other name: Keith A. Sintay
- Education: Central Michigan University
- Occupation: Character animator

Keith Sintay is an American animator. Sintay has been an animation artist at Walt Disney Studios, DreamWorks Feature Animation, Sony Pictures Imageworks, and Digital Domain as well as many other studios.

== Early life ==
Keith Sintay was born on February 22 in Southfield, Michigan. He was inspired to become and animator after seeing The Rescuers in 1977. He grew up in Livonia, Michigan, where he attended Bentley High School and Churchill High School. He was originally going to study business at Central Michigan University, but pivoted to animation while doing artwork on campus.

== Career ==
Sintay was accepted into the Disney internship program and was hired shortly after to work on Pocahontas. Sintay has worked on the films Hunchback of Notre Dame, Mulan, and Tarzan at Disney Feature, and Spirit, Sinbad and Shark Tale at DreamWorks. At Sony Pictures Imageworks, he was Sr. Animator on Open Season, Monster House, Beowulf and I am Legend. He worked at Digital Domain on Transformers: Revenge of the Fallen and Tron:Legacy. He now works as a senior character animator for Industrial Light and Magic, working on Star Wars projects.

In addition to his work as an animator, Sintay is a contributing artist and illustrator for several books by author Mark Simon. Included in these are Facial Expressions and Storyboards, Motion in Art.

== Personal life ==
Sintay currently lives in the Los Angeles area. He lives with his wife Connie and their five rescued dogs. He also owns a collection of Star Wars memorabilia- complete with a life size R2-D2 and C-3PO, and a wall of Darth Vader helmets.

== Filmography ==
=== Film ===
Year	Title	Credits	Characters	Notes
1995	Pocahontas	Inbetweener	Pocahontas	Walt Disney Feature Animation
1996	The Hunchback of Notre Dame	Inbetween Artist	Gargoyles	Walt Disney Feature Animation
1998	Mulan	Inbetween Artist	Mulan	Walt Disney Feature Animation
1999	Tarzan	Additional Clean-Up Artist	Terk, Young Tarzan	Walt Disney Feature Animation
2002	Spirit: Stallion of the Cimmeron	Animator	Spirit, Little Creek	DreamWorks Animation
2003	Sinbad: Legend of the Seven Seas	Animator	Sinbad's Crew, Dog	DreamWorks Animation
2004	Shark Tale	Animator	Oscar, Angie	DreamWorks Animation
2006	Open Season	Senior Animator	Beth, Boog, Elliot	Sony Pictures Imageworks
2006	Monster House	Senior Animator	House, Kids	Sony Pictures Imageworks
2007	Surf's Up	Senior Animator	Cody, Big Z, Tank	Sony Pictures Imageworks
2007	Beowulf	Senior Animator	Beowulf, Dragon, Horses	Sony Pictures Imageworks
2007	I Am Legend	Senior Animator	Hemocytes	Sony Pictures Imageworks
2009	G.I. Joe: The Rise of Cobra	Senior Animator	Joes	Digital Domain
2009	Transformers: Revenge of the Fallen	Senior Animator	Wheels, var. Bots	Digital Domain
2010	Percy Jackson & The Olympians: The Lightning Thief	Senior Animator		Digital Domain
2010	Piranha 3D	Senior Animator		
2010	Tron: Legacy	Senior Animator		Digital Domain
2011	Transformers: Dark of the Moon	Animator		Digital Domain
2012	Men In Black 3	Senior Animator		Sony Pictures Imageworks
2013	Iron Man 3	Visual effects		Scanline VFX
2014	300: Rise of an Empire	Visual effects		Scanline VFX
2014	Transformers: Age of Extinction	Senior Animator		Industrial Light and Magic
2014	Teenage Mutant Ninja Turtles	Animator		Industrial Light and Magic
2015	Zhong Kui: Snow Girl and the Dark Crystal	Senior Animator		Pixomondo
2015	Avengers: Age of Ultron	Senior Animator		Industrial Light and Magic
2015	Impossible	Animator		Pixomondo
2016	Alice Through the Looking Glass	Senior Animator		Sony Pictures Imageworks
2016	Teenage Mutant Ninja Turtles: Out of the Shadows	Senior Animator		Industrial Light and Magic
2016	Rogue One: A Star Wars Story	Senior Animator		Industrial Light and Magic
2017	Star Wars Episode VIII: The Last Jedi	Senior Animator		Industrial Light and Magic
2018	Solo: A Star Wars Story	Visual effects		Industrial Light and Magic

=== Television ===
Year	Title	Credits	Notes
2021	WandaVision	Senior Animator	
2021	Loki	Senior Animator	Industrial Light and Magic
2022	Obi-Wan Kenobi	Senior Animator	Industrial Light and Magic
2023	The Mandalorian	Senior Animator	Industrial Light and Magic
2023	Ahsoka	Senior Animator	Industrial Light and Magic
