= Stephen M. Colarelli =

Stephen M. Colarelli is an American psychology professor at Central Michigan University, known for his research on evolutionary psychology and the workplace.

== Biography ==
Stephen Colarelli is a professor of psychology at Central Michigan University. He was a visiting professor of management at the National University of Singapore and Hong Kong Baptist University, and a Fulbright Fellow at the University of Zambia. He earned a B.A. from Northwestern University, an M.A. from the University of Chicago, and a Ph.D. in psychology from New York University. He served a Peace Corps volunteer in Senegal from 1973 to 1975.

Colarelli's major area of interest is the application of evolutionary psychology to the world of work.
