= TVM3 =

Television channel in Switzerland

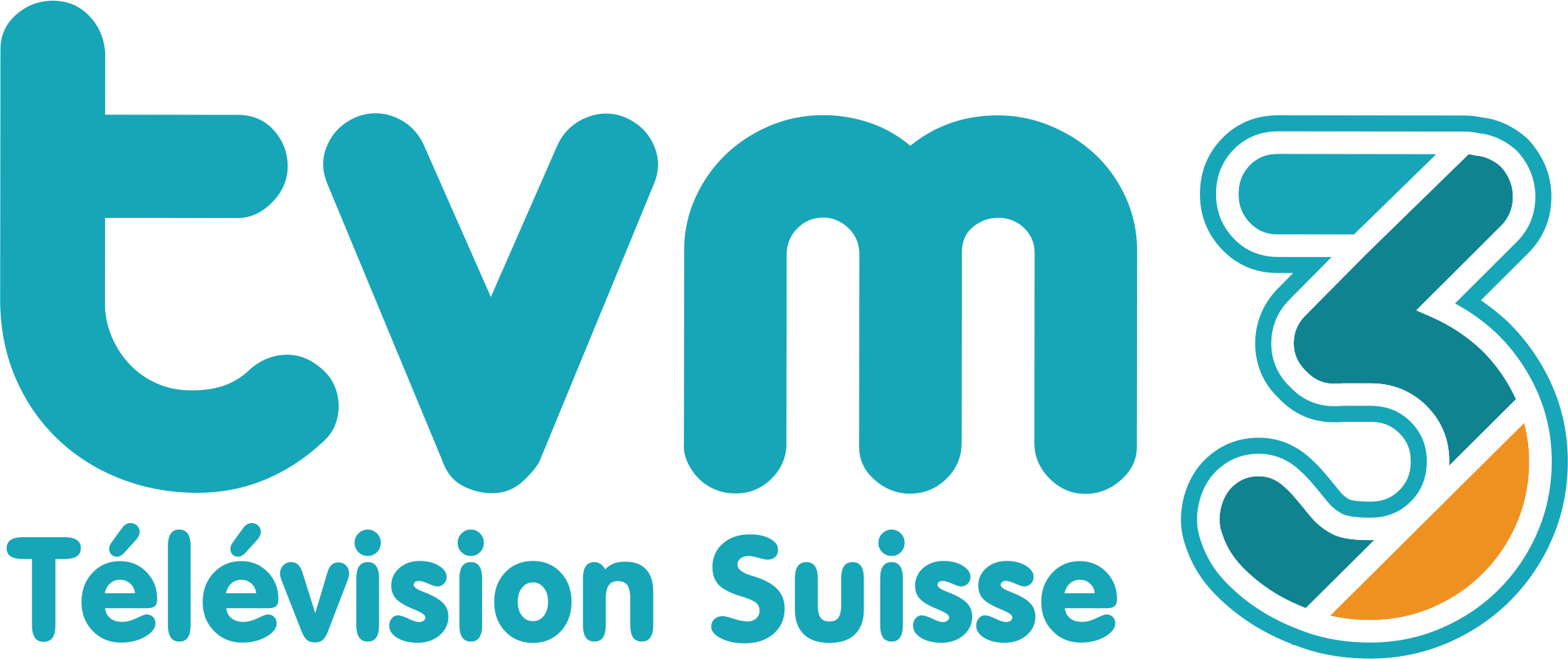
- Country: Switzerland
- Broadcast area: Switzerland; France; Monaco; Belgium; Canada; Luxembourg

Programming
- Picture format: 16:9 (SDTV)

History
- Launched: 1 May 2004

Links
- Website: www.tvm3.tv

TVM3 is a private television station in Switzerland (French speaking area).

== Channel History ==
TVM3 is the first private television station authorised to broadcast to the whole of Swiss romandy since the end of the station called Télécinéromandie in 1993. The station broadcasts from the same studios of the old station in Ecublens.

TVM3 obtained a concession from the Swiss regulator "Office fédéral de la communication" (OFCOM) 2 July 2003. The concession obtained by TVM3 is valid for 10 years and allows the station to be automatically transmitted by cable or via IPTV (SwisscomTV / SunriseTV / VTX, etc.). The channel was launched 1 May 2004, first on analogue. Its coverage was increased some following years later to include all Swiss romandy (by cable and IPTV) and a few years later the whole of Switzerland.

The 21 December 2005, l'Office fédéral de la communication (OFCOM) authorised Philippe Hersant (groupe Hersant Média - GHM), via E.S.H. Éditions Suisses Holding SA, to take control of 35% of the share of the station. The remaining 65% of the shares are held by the stations founders, Fabien and Lolita Aubry.

The station is accessible via streaming on its website.

== Organisation ==
=== Founders and Partners ===
Owner and Directors :

- Lolita and Fabien Aubry : since its creation in May 2004.

=== Capital ===
TVM3 does not receive any part of the Swiss television license nor state financial aide.

=== Headquarters ===
The stations headquarters are located in Écublens in the Canton de Vaud.

== Distribution ==
The station is transmitted on cable and analogue in most parts of Swiss Romandy and on all digital cable providers. It is all transmitted via Swisscom TV and via internet.

== Programmes ==
The station broadcasts a lot of music videos, but also has a daily news and weather bulletins and a programme about films, DVD releases and celebrity interviews.

- Face à face, simply interviews linked with a musical theme with political figures and others from the Swiss Romandy region.
- Swiss Pop Music, a show specifically for Swiss music artistes, 18h30 to 19h00 from Monday to Sunday.
- DVD Wood, a programme about the latest DVD releases.
- TVM3 News, every morning, the news live with the daily headlines.
- Freakish, news about shows and festivals in Swiss Romandy.
- TVM3 Family, every day cartoons suitable for all ages.
- TVM3 Météo, Weather bulletins.
- Sacré Jeu ! game show produced by Telemedia (Hungary) broadcast every day at 22h00 to 00h00 since 14 April 2014.
- People Magazine, was broadcast from Monday to Friday from 19h00 to 20h00 and on weekends from 17h to 18h until 26 July 2014.
- Star People, a show about the latest celeb gossip.
- Pas si bête !, (lit.) not so stupid, an animals pad.
- Les clefs de l'avenir, a programme about fortune telling, live for 2 hours where viewers can ask questions every day from 20h to 22h.
- Ciné TVM3 : Horror Obscures
- Studio TVM3 an hour long interviews with trending music stars every Sunday.
- Bienvenue chez nous, The first Swiss television series for the Swiss all about Swiss Romandy.

The station also broadcasts programmes with a musical theme:

- Collectors, the best of 70’s, 80’s and 90’s music.
- Best Of, 30 minutes to discover all the music videos of a star.
- Clubbing, the best of Club music.
- Altitubes, Top 50 of the station, broadcast weekdays.
- Référence R’N’B, playing R’N’B, Rap and Hip-Hop.
- Génération TVM3 only for the latest music.

== Onscreen dog ==
Old logo

Current logo

== See also ==
- Television in Switzerland
