= TeleTicino =

Swiss television network

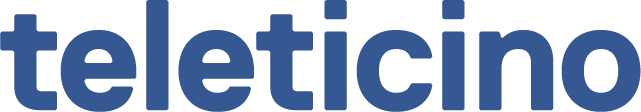
- Country: Switzerland
- Broadcast area: Ticino
- Headquarters: Melide

Programming
- Language(s): Italian

Ownership
- Owner: Timedia Holding SA

History
- Launched: 1994

Links
- Website: www.teleticino.ch

TeleTicino (styled in lower case as teleticino) is an Italian-language television channel based in Melide, Switzerland. It was established in 1987.

The channel provides local news and entertainment programming for the Ticino canton, which has a mostly Italian-speaking population. Its programming includes talk shows, political debates, comedies in the local Ticinese dialect, entertainment, and sports.

The channel is majority-owned by Timedia Holding SA, which also owns Corriere del Ticino, a local newspaper. Though it is privately owned, it receives public subsidies from television licence fees.
