= Tele 24 =

- Country: Switzerland
- Broadcast area: Switzerland
- Headquarters: Zürich, Switzerland

Programming
- Language(s): Swiss German
- Picture format: 576i (4:3 SDTV)

History
- Launched: 5 October 1998; 26 years ago
- Closed: 30 November 2001; 23 years ago
- Replaced by: S1

Links
- Website: www.tele24.ch

Tele24 was a Swiss private television channel run by Roger Schawinski. It broadcast from 5 October 1998 until 20 November 2001. On 18 October 2013, Tele 24 was replaced by its successor, S1.

== Ownership ==
Initially, Schawinski's Belcom Holding AG owned 50% of Tele24, while the media companies Ringier and Tamedia owned 25% each. In 1999, Ringier sold half its stake to Belcom Holding AG and half to Tamedia. At the end of 2001, Tamedia bought Belcom Holding AG without the shares in Tele24.

== History ==
Tele24 developed from the Zurich regional broadcaster TeleZüri, which was also founded by Schawinski. In the Zurich region, Tele24 and TeleZüri broadcast a single programme schedule. Both channels were produced in a single location.

- 1998: Broadcasting of Tele24 began
- 1999: An investment fund of Credit Suisse First Boston bought 40% of Belcom Holding AG and thereby became an indirect owner of Tele24.
- 2001: Belcom Holding AG was sold to Tamedia.
- 2001: The last broadcast took place on 30 November 2001.
- 2013: It gets replaced by its new successor station S1.

== Programming ==
Tele24 exclusively broadcast shows that it had produced itself.

News shows:

- SwissNews: News programme with a strong focus on Switzerland, which was broadcast live at 6pm and 8pm. At 7pm the show was broadcast a second time and from 9pm it was repeated hourly.
- Money: Magazine show with information on the stock markets and interviews with business leaders.
- 24 Minuten: Magazine show
- Live-Übertragungen: Live broadcasts of important press conferences (e.g. the Swissair crisis) or elections to the Swiss Federal Council

Talk shows:

- TalkTäglich: Daily talkshow with a guest. Viewers could call in. Tele24 chief and part-owner Roger Schawinski starred in several editions of the show each day.
- Silvan Grütter: Weekend talkshow starring Silvan Grütter.
- Fadegrad: Weekend talkshow starring Christian Handelsman, which replaced Silvan Grütter's show after he moved to TV3.
- SonnTalk: Sunday broadcast with journalists and politicians discussing current affairs of the previous week.
- Bistro: Daily talk and variety show, starring Christian Handelsman

Variety shows:

- SwissDate: Weekend dating show
- Inside: Weekend people's magazine show
- Blöff: Game show
- Lifestyle: a show which interviewed prominent individuals.
- Venus & Mars: Variety show on relationship problems.
- Jukebox: Daily music broadcast, starring Reto Peritz (This was the first programme broadcast by Tele24)

== General information ==
So-called "Video Journalists" ("VJs") produced the news shows. The VJ was both a journalist and a cameraman/woman. As a result, Tele24 was able to produce content comparatively cheaply.

Tele24 was included in most Swiss Cable television bundles and all Swiss Satellite television.

The market share of Tele24 ranged between 1.0 and 1.1% (15-49 year olds, 6-pm-11pm) between 1999 and 2001, according to Telecontrol and SRG-Forschungsdienst.

At the beginning of 2001, it was announced that Money would be outsourced to its own TV station, led by Markus Gilli and called Money24, which was to be Switzerland's first dedicated financial news channel. Ironically, the financial situation of Tele24 made this seem very unrealistic. How far this project was developed is unknown.

== Bibliography ==
- Schawinski, Roger: TV-Monopoly. Die Inside-Story. 2002, ISBN 3280050324.
