= TeleZüri =

Television channel in Zürich, Switzerland

- Logo
- Broadcast area: Switzerland
- Network: CH Media Network
- Headquarters: Zürich, Switzerland

Programming
- Picture format: 1080i (HDTV); 480i (SDTV)

Ownership
- Owner: CH Media
- Sister channels: Tele M1; Tele Bärn; Tele 1; TV Ostschweiz

History
- Launched: 3 October 1994; 31 years ago

Links
- Website: www.telezueri.ch

TeleZüri is a local television channel for the city and agglomeration of Zürich, Switzerland. It was founded by Roger Schawinski, a pioneer of local radio. Today it is owned by the Swiss media company CH Media.

TeleZüri features a daily 45-minute-long program, which starts airing at 6 pm. It is repeated hourly. Its daily shows are ZüriNews, ZüriInfo and TalkTäglich. On Fridays the show Lifestyle and on Saturdays the cooking show SwissDinner are aired. On Sundays, some of the most controversial topics of the week are discussed on SonnTalk. The program structure has not changed much since the channel went on air.
