= 2009 in Irish television =

The following is a list of events relating to television in Ireland from 2009.

== Events ==
=== January ===
- 5 January – 3e launches, replacing Channel 6.
- January – TV3 relaunches under the corporate name of The TV3 Group, although officially they remain TV3 Television Network Limited. The TV3 Group consists of TV3, 3e and tv3.i.e.

=== February ===
- 9 February – The new look RTÉ News is unveiled on the One O'Clock News programme.

=== April ===
- 21 April – It is announced that Lorraine Keane, the main presenter of Xposé will leave the series. TV3 subsequently launches a nationwide search for a new presenter.

=== May ===
- 5 May – RTÉ's chief economics editor George Lee is named as the Fine Gael candidate for the Dublin South by-election.
- 29 May – Pat Kenny presents his final edition of The Late Late Show.

=== June ===
- 3 June – TV3 announces that Michael O'Doherty, Emma Ledden and Gerry Lundberg will judge the applicants for the next Xposé presenter on a new TV show called Total Xposure.
- 5 June – George Lee wins the Dublin South by-election.

=== July ===
- 12 July –
  - The Broadcasting Act 2009 is signed into law. Many of the provisions of the Act relating to RTÉ also apply to TG4, with the station being subject to regulation from the new Broadcasting Authority of Ireland once the relevant provisions are commenced. The Act also changes the English-language title of the chief executive of TG4 to "Director-General" in line with RTÉ, and in the Irish language from "Ceannasaí" to "Ardstiúrthóir". There have been two Chief Executives of TG4, Cathal Goan (former Director-General of RTÉ from 1996 to 2000) and the current Director General, Pól Ó Gallchóir.
  - Section 113 of the Act changes the name of RTÉ from "Radio Telefís Éireann" to "Raidió Teilifís Éireann", in order to reflect the 'proper' spelling of the name in Irish. However, the station retains its "Radio Telefís Éireann" logo at the entrance to its Donnybrook headquarters in Dublin.

=== August ===
- 11 August – Seán Munsanje is declared the winner of Total Xposure, winning a six-month contract with TV3 as the newest member of the Xposé team. His contract was not renewed.

=== September ===
- 4 September – Ryan Tubridy takes over as presenter of The Late Late Show as the series returns for its 49th season. His first guest on the programme is Taoiseach Brian Cowen.
- 21 September – RTÉ Television relaunched The Angelus broadcast before RTÉ News: Six One, featuring seven different editions, with seven respective people for each one.
- 25 September – The Broadcasting Authority of Ireland (BAI) meets to review 20 complaints made to it by individuals in relation to phone charges for callers to TV3's late night quiz show Play TV. Of these fifteen are upheld, one is rejected, one is determined to be invalid and two require further investigation. Four days earlier, on 21 September callers to the Liveline radio show on RTÉ Radio 1 had complained about the phone charges and methods used for the programme. Host Joe Duffy stated that many of his listeners and callers had not got a satisfactory reply from TV3 in relation to their complaints and hence his reason for this section of his show, and that TV3 was unwilling to be a part of the discussion show having been asked by RTÉ Radio. Some of the contestants had not been paid their prize money. TV3 advised viewers who played the game to go to RegTel with any complaints.

=== October ===
- 1 October – The provisions of the Broadcasting Act 2009 relating to the Broadcasting Authority of Ireland commences.

=== November ===
- 19 November – The FAI makes an official complaint to FIFA and requests a replay, after France qualify for the 2010 FIFA World Cup in South Africa the previous night with a goal resulting from a double handball by their striker and team captain Thierry Henry. FIFA and the French Football Federation refuse. The incident attracts comment globally. Fans protest outside the French embassy in Dublin. The match had been watched by Ireland's highest television audience of 2009 and the highest audience for any sporting event in the country since 1995.

=== December ===
- 14 December – Steve Rayner wins the second series of The Apprentice.
- 18 December – Gay Byrne, the original host of The Late Late Show makes a one-off return to the programme as one of Ryan Tubridy's guests.
- 26 December – TV3 News announce that it has been informed that the Minister for Finance Brian Lenihan is suffering from a serious illness. TV3 say the announcement was made for the public good, but attract criticism for the way the story was announced.

== Debuts ==
=== RTÉ ===
- 4 January – The All Ireland Talent Show on RTÉ One (2009–2011)
- 6 January – The Lucy Kennedy Show on RTÉ Two (2009)
- 19 February – Dragons' Den on RTÉ One (2009–2017)
- 3 March – Chuggington on RTÉ Two (2008–2015)
- 10 March – Monday Night Soccer on RTÉ Two (2009–2013)
- 31 May – Traffic Blues on RTÉ One (2009–2011)
- 7 September – Two Tube on RTÉ Two (2009–present)
- September – Yu-Gi-Oh! 5D's on RTÉ Two (2008–2011)
- 14 September – Baz's Culture Clash on RTÉ Two (2009)
- 21 September – The Frontline on RTÉ One (2009–2013)
- 24 October – Republic of Telly on RTÉ One (2009–2016)
- Undated – Rush on RTÉ One (2008–2011)
- Undated – United States of Tara on RTÉ Two (2009–2011)

=== TV3 ===
- 11 May – The Morning Show with Sybil & Martin on TV3 (2009–2013)
- 25 May – Play TV on TV3 (2009–2010)
- 3 June – Total Xposure on TV3 (2009)
- 9 September – Midweek on TV3 (2009–2014)
- 13 November – Deal or No Deal on TV3 (2009–2010)
- 23 November – 3e News on 3e (2009–present)

=== TG4 ===
- 10 January – Lola & Virginia (2006–2007)
- 28 January – The Pinky and Perky Show (2008–2009)
- 31 August – Franny's Feet (2003–2010)
- 4 September – Total Drama Island (2007–2008)

=== UTV ===
- 3 August – Brain Box (2009–2011)

== Changes of network affiliation ==
Shows	Moved from	Moved to
My Gym Partner's a Monkey	TG4	RTÉ2

== Ongoing television programmes ==
=== 1960s ===
- RTÉ News: Nine O'Clock (1961–present)
- RTÉ News: Six One (1962–present)
- The Late Late Show (1962–present)

=== 1970s ===
- The Late Late Toy Show (1975–present)
- RTÉ News on Two (1978–2014)
- The Sunday Game (1979–present)

=== 1980s ===
- The Den (1986–2010)
- Fair City (1989–present)
- RTÉ News: One O'Clock (1989–present)

=== 1990s ===
- Would You Believe (1990s–present)
- Winning Streak (1990–2020)
- Prime Time (1992–present)
- Nuacht RTÉ (1995–present)
- Nuacht TG4 (1996–present)
- Ros na Rún (1996–present)
- Premier Soccer Saturday (1998–2013)
- TV3 News (1998–present)
- The View (1999–2011)
- Ireland AM (1999–present)
- Telly Bingo (1999–present)

=== 2000s ===
- Nationwide (2000–present)
- TV3 News at 5.30 (2001–present)
- The Panel (2003–2011)
- Against the Head (2003–present)
- news2day (2003–present)
- Other Voices (2003–present)
- The Afternoon Show (2004–2010)
- Ryan Confidential (2004–2010)
- The Podge and Rodge Show (2006–2010)
- Saturday Night with Miriam (2005–present)
- Anonymous (2006–2011)
- One to One (2006–2013)
- The Week in Politics (2006–present)
- Tonight with Vincent Browne (2007–2017)
- Xposé (2007–2019)
- Championship Throw-In (2008–2010)
- The Apprentice (2008–2011)
- Monday Night Soccer (2008–2013)
- At Your Service (2008–present)
- Championship Live (2008–present)
- Midday (2008–2016)
- Operation Transformation (2008–2024)
- Raw (2008–2013)
- The Big Money Game (2008–2013)

== Ending this year ==
- 3 February – The Lucy Kennedy Show (2009)
- 23 March – Sports Tonight (1998–2009)
- 24 April – Seoige and O'Shea (2006–2009)
- 30 May – Tubridy Tonight (2004–2009)
- 29 June – Questions and Answers (1986–2009)
- 11 August – Total Xposure (2009)
- 15 November – The Clinic (2003–2009)
- Undated – Seacht (2008–2009)

== Deaths ==
- 8 March – Anna Manahan, 84, stage, film and television actress
- 20 December – Joan Brosnan Walsh, actress

== See also ==
- 2009 in Ireland
