= List of quiz channels =

This is a list of notable quiz channels.

== South America ==
=== Argentina ===
- Ring Caja
- Llamá y Ganá

=== Brazil ===
- Top Game
- Agora é Hora
- Hot Game
- Desafio Show
- Tela Interativa

=== Chile ===
- Llama y Gana

=== Peru ===
- Aquí se gana

=== Puerto Rico ===
- Ring Ring Gana

=== Colombia ===
- Ring Ring Gana
- Aquí se Gana

== North America ==
Although there are no quiz channels in North America, these are interactive programs similar to quiz channels:

=== Canada ===
- "Play TV"; Global, Telelatino (Telemedia InteracTV)
- "The Quiz Hour"; CHCH-DT (SPORT1)
- "Moneyquizzer"; CHCH-DT
- "Call TV"; V (MassResponse (subsidiary of Telekom Austria); cancelled
- "L'Instant gagnant"; V (Telemedia InteracTV); February 2012 – present

=== Mexico ===
- "Marca y Gana"
- "Tiempo de Ganar"

=== United States ===
- "My GamesFever"; MyNetworkTV; December 2006 - April 2007; cancelled
- "Play2Win"; Superstation WGN, WPIX-TV; August 2006 - March 2007; cancelled
- "PlayMania"; GSN; April 2006 - February 2007; cancelled
- "100 Winners"; February 2007 - June 2007; cancelled
- "quiznation"; February 2007 - October 2007; cancelled
- "Take the Cake"; BET; July 2007 - November 2007; cancelled
- "Midnight Money Madness"; TBS; August 2006 - October 2006; cancelled
- "GSN Live"; GSN; February 2008 - May 2011; cancelled
- "Juegos PlayTV"; Telemedia InteracTV

== Europe ==
=== Belgium ===
The games started airing as from 2004. In Flanders the main TV channels already banned the games between 2008 and 2010, except vtm and 2BE who stopped in 2011. In Wallonia the games are still broadcast.

The Belgian cabaret Neveneffecten had a TV-show Basta in January 2011 on channel Eén. In their second episode, Basta could prove these games were a fraud. Neveneffecten found a job posting as host for such games and they asked Maxime De Winne to apply for the job and to go undercover. De Winne got the job and was a host for about 4 months and used hidden cameras to record conversations with the management. Neveneffecten also hired a math expert: Gaeten de Weert. After some months, De Weert was able to solve every math puzzle, but noticed the answer of the puzzle is incorrect in 16% of the cases due to miscalculation of the producers. De Weert called the studio during a live game and was able to give the correct answer. He also said the show was a fraud and he was going to publish the solution key on the Internet, which he actually did. The episode was aired on 17 January 2011, vtm and 2BE decided to stop the games as from 20 January 2011.

The broadcast did not have effect in Wallonia although De Weert was also able to break the solution keys of the call games on these channels in August 2013. The games are no more aired since March 2014.

=== France ===
- "123 Quizz" (Telemedia InteracTV)

No more call-tv shows are aired since 2007, these games are prohibited by the French law.

=== Germany ===
- ProSiebenSat.1 Media:
  - sixx: "Night-Loft"; (9Live); 20?? - 2010; cancelled
  - Sat.1: "QUIZ NIGHT"; (9Live); 20?? - 2011; cancelled
  - ProSieben: "ProSieben Night-Loft"; (9Live); 20?? - 2011; cancelled
  - kabel eins: "kabel eins Filmquiz"; (9Live); 20?? - 2011; cancelled
  - 9Live; 2001 - 2011
- Das Vierte (subsidiary of NBC Universal); 2005 - 2013:
  - "Hollywood Quiz"; (Mass Response); 20?? - 2008; cancelled
  - "Cash Quiz"; (Mass Response); 20?? - 2009; cancelled
  - "Spiel mit mir"; (2am productions); 20?? - 2009; cancelled
  - "The Hotline"; (SPORT1); 20?? - 2011; cancelled
  - "FunDorado.com Late Night Show"; (SPORT1); 20?? - 2011; cancelled
- RTL Group:
  - RTL: "Quiz-Night"; cancelled
  - Super RTL: "Masterquiz"; (Mass Response); 20?? - 2010; cancelled
  - n-tv: "n-tv News Quiz"; cancelled
  - K1010 TV; 2004 - 2006; cancelled
- FTL Deutschland; 2012 - 2013:
  - "Glückspilz"; 20?? - 2012; cancelled
  - "Goldene Zeiten"; 20?? - 2013; cancelled
  - "Quizexpress"; (Telemedia InteracTV); 20?? - 2013; cancelled
- MTV Central, Nickelodeon Germany, VIVA, Comedy Central Germany: "Money Express"; (Callactive (subsidiary of Endemol), later produced by Mass Response); 20?? - September 2008; cancelled
- Tele 5: "Bei Anruf - Spiel!"; 20?? - 2008; cancelled
- Star TV: "QuizExpress"; 20?? - 2014; cancelled
- Hallo TV: "Call2Win"; 20?? - 2014; cancelled
- SPORT1: "Sportquiz"; 2003 - 2022; cancelled
- Folx TV: "FolxQuiz"; 2013 - 2021; cancelled

Till 2011, Sat.1, ProSieben and kabeleins had quick Quiz Shows, called "Quiz Breaks" or "Quiz Time". These Shows only lasted few minutes and interrupted TV-sitcoms like "Scrubs" in the morning to get viewers to call the phone numbers.

Shortly after adoption of the Rundfunkstaatsvertrag (broadcast treaty) in September 2008, which allows the regulators to impose fines to the channels in case of irregularity, several channels announced the end of phone-in quizzes.

=== Israel ===
- "Quiz Call" (Me-tsal-tse-lim); Channel 10; June 2007 - December 2008; cancelled
- "צלצול הכסף" (Tsil-tsul Ha-ke-sef); Channel 22 (Reshet); March 2008 - December 2008; cancelled
- "לילה לבן" (Lai-la La-van); Channel 22 (Reshet); 2009 - 2010; cancelled
- Moon Time; Channel 10; July 2013 - February 2014; cancelled

=== Netherlands ===
In the Netherlands, call-in quizzes were officially banned by law after losing all network support in November 2007. These programs were cancelled in the Flemish part of Belgium as from January 2011. De Neveneffecten revealed in their television show "Basta" fraud on large scale. The games are still aired in the Wallon part of Belgium.

=== Switzerland ===
- Star TV:
  - "Swissquiz" (PRIMAVERA TV); 20?? - 2010; cancelled
  - "Quizexpress" (Telemedia Interac TV); 20?? - July 2014; cancelled
- 4+:
  - "Quizexpress" (Telemedia InteracTV) http://www.calltv.com/quizexpress/-; 20?? - 2014; cancelled
- TVM3:
  - "Sacré jeu!" (Telemedia InteracTV) http://calltv.com/sacrejeu/; 2014 - 10 October 2021; cancelled
  - "People Magazine" (Telemedia InteracTV); 20?? - 28 July 2014; cancelled
- S1 TV:
  - "Quizexpress" (Telemedia InteracTV); July 2020 - December 2020; cancelled
- Swiss1:
  - "Moviequiz" (Telemedia InteracTV); 1 April 2022 - 3 April 2022; cancelled

=== Czechia ===
- "Svůdná šance"; TV Prima (Telemedia InteracTV); 2003 - 2004; cancelled
- "Chytrý Prachy"; TV Praha, TV Hradec Králové, TV Galaxie, Galaxie Sport; 2003 - 2004; cancelled
- "Rychlá výhra"; TV Prima (Telemedia InteracTV); 2004 - 20??; cancelled
- "Nekonečná šance"; TV Prima (Telemedia InteracTV); 2005 - 2007; cancelled
- "Snadná výhra"; TV Nova; 2006 - 2007; cancelled
- "Sexy šance"; TV Prima (TV Prima); 2008; cancelled
- "Za kačku svlíkačku"; Prima Cool (TV Prima); 2010 - 2014; cancelled
- "Film kvíz"; TV Barrandov (Telemedia InteracTV); 2012
- "Sexy Game"/"Music Game"; Óčko group, Active TV (Telemedia InteracTV); 2012 - 2014; cancelled
- "Kvíz"; TV Pětka, TV Barrandov, Active TV (Telemedia InteracTV); 2013 - 2014; cancelled
- "Sexy Výhra"; Public TV, Stil TV, Šlágr TV, Active TV (Telemedia InteracTV); 2010 - 2015; cancelled
- "Sexy Šance"; TV Pětka (Telemedia InteracTV); 2012 - 2013; cancelled
- "Ezo+"; TV Barrandov (Telemedia InteracTV); 2011 - 2013, 2015; cancelled
- "Zavolej a poslouchej"; TV Polar, V1 (Telemedia InteracTV); 2013
- "Sexy Výzva"; Rebel, Relax, TIP TV, Kinosvět (Tip TV production); 2013 - 20??; cancelled
- "Sexy trefa"; Prima Cool (TV Prima); 2014
- "Kvíz show"; Prima Love (TV Prima); 2015
- "Chatlinka" http://calltv.com/chatlinka/; Active TV http://active-tv.cz/, Barrandov TV (Telemedia InteracTV); 2015 - 2016; cancelled
- "IQ kvíz"; Rebel, Relax, Kinosvět (TipTV production); 2015 - 2018; cancelled
- "Kvíz"; UP Network; 2017
- "Linka lásky"; TV Barrandov, JOJ Family (Telemedia InteracTV); 2015 - 2019; cancelled
- "Eroskop"; Barrandov Plus (Telemedia InteracTV); 2016 - 2018, 2020; cancelled
- "Zavolej a vyhraj!"; JOJ Family (Telemedia InteracTV); 2018; cancelled
- "Rychlá hra"; TV Barrandov (Telemedia InteracTV); 2015 - 2021 (with breaks); cancelled
- "Kupuj a vyhraj"; TV Barrandov group (Telemedia InteracTV); 10 October 2021 - 28 November 2021 (with breaks); cancelled
- "Next Earth - Můžete Být Vítězem"; Óčko (Telemedia InteracTV); 15 November 2023 - 12 August 2025; cancelled

=== Romania ===
- "Câștigați Acum"; Taraf TV (Telemedia InteracTV); September 2021 – present
- "Cupoane Fantastice"; Etno TV (Telemedia InteracTV); October 2021 - November 2021; Monday - Friday 23:00 - 00:00, Saturday - Sunday 14:15 - 15:00; cancelled

=== Hungary ===
- "Tantusz"; Viasat 3 (Callactive); 2002
- "Kapcsolódj be"; Viasat 3 (Callactive); 2002
- "Sztárcsázz"; Viasat 3 (Callactive); 2002
- "10 Kvíz"; Viva (Telemedia InteracTV); 2007 -2012
- "Gazdagodj Okosan!"; M1 (Telemedia InteracTV); 2005
- "Tiszta kvíz"; M1 (Telemedia InteracTV); 2008
- "Játékhullám"; Duna; 2005
- "Nyerő Bolt"; ATV (Telemedia InteracTV); 3 January 2022 - 10 January 2022; Monday - Sunday 22:45 - 23:45; cancelled
- "MentorCenter"; ATV (Telemedia InteracTV); 14 January 2022 - 3 February 2022; Monday - Sunday 22:45 - 23:45; cancelled

=== Croatia ===
- "Nova lova"; NOVA TV (Telemedia InteracTV); Monday - Saturday 09:30 - 10:30; canceled
- "Kunolovac"; RTL TELEVIZIJA (9Live); Sunday - Wednesday 00:00 - 02:00, Monday - Friday 09:15 - 10:15; cancelled
- "Uzmi sve!"; OTV (Telemedia InteracTV); Monday - Sunday 19:00 - 20:00; cancelled
- "Uzmi lovu!"; OTV, Z1 (Mass response); cancelled
- "Laka lova!"; OTV (MAG - DRIVE d.o.o.); cancelled
- "Trezor!"; Z1 (MAG - DRIVE d.o.o.); cancelled
- "Jackpot!"; OTV (Omega-produkcija d.o.o.); cancelled
- "Brzofon"; Z1 (Telemedia InteracTV); July 2012 - August 2012; cancelled
- "Zodijak+"; Z1 (Telemedia InteracTV); cancelled

=== Bosnia and Herzegovina ===
- "Dvostruka sansa"; BN, BN Sat (Advantec Group D.O.O); August 2008 - April 2009; Monday - Friday 16:18 - 17:15, Saturday 14:30 - 16:00; cancelled
- "Kešolovac"; OBN (Telemedia InteracTV); October 2008 - February 2009; Monday - Friday 00:40 - 02:40; cancelled
- "Najbrži igrač"; OBN (Telemedia InteracTV); July 2012 - December 2012, May 2013 - November 2013; cancelled
- "Pravi poziv"; Pink BH (Telemedia InteracTV); July 2013 - October 2013; cancelled
- "Tele kviz"; OBN (Go live produkcija); December 2013 - January 2014; Monday - Friday 12:10 - 13:00, Saturday 13:45 - 14:45, Sunday 14:45 - 15:45; cancelled
- "Zlatna nit"; Balkan Media; OBN (October 2015 - March 2016), Hayat TV, Hayat Plus (December 2017 - January 2018); cancelled
- "Ja znam"; OTV Valentino, Pink Plus, BN Music, YU Planet Bec, RTV 101 (Balkan Media); February 2017 - July 2021; Monday - Sunday 17:00 - 18:00; cancelled
- "Najbrzi prsti"; OBN (Old production); September 2017 - February 2018; Monday - Friday 12:05 - 13:05, Saturday - Sunday 10:20 - 11:20; cancelled
- "Isplati se"; Euromedia D.O.O.; OBN (April 2018 - May 2018), BN, BN Sat (December 2019 - January 2020); cancelled
- "Znanje je imanje"; OBN (101 Solutions D.O.O.); October 2020 - November 2020; Monday - Sunday 11:10 - 12:00; cancelled
- "Vasa sansa"; SMS VOICE PREMIUM SOLUTION; FACE TV (October 2020 - November 2020, Monday - Thursday 17:00 - 18:45, Friday - Sunday 14:20 - 15:50, Monday - Sunday 00:05 - 02:00), Alfa TV (January 2021, Monday - Friday 13:40 - 14:40, Saturday - Sunday 15:00 - 16:00); cancelled
- "Fonto"; BN Music, OTV Valentino, P-TV Vienna, RTV 101 (Balkan Media); October 2021 - April 2023; Monday - Sunday 17:30 - 18:30; cancelled

=== Finland ===
- "Tiedä ja voita"; Nelonen 4, JIM and the radio station Metro Helsinki (Telemedia InteracTV); 2014 - 2021; cancelled
- Eurojahti used Telemedia InteracTV game formats 2013
- Voittosoitto used Telemedia InteracTV game formats 2012
- "Voittostudio" http://voittostudio.com; MTV3, SUB TV (Telemedia InteracTV); 2014 - 2016; cancelled
- "Arpastudio"; Eveo (Telemedia InteracTV); 9 June 2023 - 9 September 2023; Friday - Sunday 20:00 - 22:00; cancelled
- "ARPA.FI"; MTV3, MTV SUB (Telemedia InteracTV); 9 October 2023 – present
- "Voittovisa"; Eveo (Telemedia InteracTV); 5 January 2024 - 7 January 2024; Friday - Sunday 21:00 - 23:00; cancelled
- "Arpastudio"; Eveo (Telemedia InteracTV); 12 January 2024 - 21 January 2024; Friday - Sunday 21:00 - 23:00; cancelled
- "Voittovisa"; Eveo (Telemedia InteracTV); 9 March 2024 - 23 March 2024; Saturday - Sunday 19:00 - 20:30; cancelled
- "TangoVisa"; Eveo (Telemedia InteracTV); 12 July 2023 - 13 July 2023; cancelled
- "IskelmäVisa"; Eveo (Telemedia InteracTV); 19 July 2023 - 20 July 2023; cancelled

=== Estonia ===
- "Mängi ja Võida"; Kanal 2, Kanal 11 (Telemedia InteracTV); June 2019 - August 2019; cancelled
- "Võidustuudio"; TV3, TV6 (Telemedia InteracTV); 5 August 2024 - 31 May 2025; cancelled

=== Greece ===
- "Quiz make-r"; Makedonia TV (Telemedia InteracTV); 20?? - 2014; cancelled; Show banned and fined for misleading te public
- "ΕΙΣΑΙ Ο ΝΙΚΗΤΗΣ"; Art TV (Telemedia InteracTV); 20?? - 2014; cancelled; Show banned and fined for misleading the public
- "ΒΡΕΣ ΤΟ ΚΑΙ ΚΕΡΔΙΣΕ!"; Art TV (Teledia InteracTV); 20?? - 2014; cancelled; Show banned and fined for misleading the public
- "Super game"; Ant1 (Telemedia InteracTV); 20?? - 2014; cancelled; Show banned and fined for misleading the public

=== Serbia ===
- "Lovac na novac"; PINK (Telemedia InteracTV); May 2008 - April 2009; Monday - Friday 09:05 - 10:05; cancelled
- "Usijanje"; FOX (Telemedia InteracTV); 2008; Monday - Friday 11:05 - 11:55; cancelled
- "Srećni poziv"; b92 (Telemedia InteracTV); February 2009 - May 2009; cancelled
- "Najbrži igrač Srbije"; Pink (Telemedia InteracTV); July 2013 - January 2014; Monday - Sunday 12:02 - 12:50; cancelled
- "Kviz"; Pink Plus (Telemedia InteracTV); August 2013; Monday - Friday 14:00 - 15:00; cancelled
- "Happy poziv"; Happy tv (Telemedia InteracTV); September 2013 - October 2013; Monday - Sunday 08:00 - 09:30; cancelled
- "Vasa sansa"; Super SAT TV, NTV Jasmin, TV Duga Plus (SMS VOICE PREMIUM SOLUTION); November 2020 - February 2021; Monday - Sunday 17:00 - 19:00; cancelled

=== North Macedonia ===
- "Brzi pari"; Kanal 5 (Interactive Media Services Production); July 2007 - January 2009; Monday - Friday 14:55 - 16:00, Saturday 11:00 - 12:00; cancelled
- "Ako znaes"; Sitel (Capitol Media Group Production); March 2008 - November 2008 (with breaks); Monday - Friday 12:30 - 14:00; cancelled
- "Zlatna treska"; Sitel (Capitol Media Group Production); June 2008 - August 2008; Monday - Friday 19:50 - 20:00, Sunday 19:10 - 19:30; cancelled
- "Alo, alo..."; Capitol Media Group Production; Alfa tv (December 2008 - July 2011 (with breaks), Monday - Friday 11:00 - 12:00), Sky Net (October 2010 - December 2010, Monday - Sunday 17:00 - 18:45); cancelled
- "Trezor"; A1, A2 (Interactive Media Services Production); November 2008 - July 2009; Monday - Friday 00:00 - 01:15, 17:00 - 18:00; cancelled
- "Srekna zvezda"; Kanal 5 (Capitol Media Group Production); March 2009 - August 2011; Monday - Friday 14:30 - 15:30, Saturday 11:00 - 12:00; cancelled
- "Kërko de fito"/"Baraj i pobedi"; Alsat M, Era (Capitol Media Group Production); May 2009 - October 2009 (with breaks); cancelled
- "Ostrovot na bogatstvoto"; A1 (Interactive Media Services Group Production); June 2009 - March 2010 (with breaks); Monday - Saturday; cancelled
- "Golemiot kes"; Kanal 5 (Capitol Media Group Production); October 2009 - April 2010; Monday - Saturday 00:20 - 01:15; cancelled
- "Arkë"/"Trezor"; Alsat M (Interactive Media Services Production); October 2009 - February 2010; Monday - Friday 23:00 - 00:00; cancelled
- "Nëse di di"/"Ako znaes"; Alsat M (Interactive Media Services Production); October 2009 - February 2010; Saturday - Sunday 17:00 - 18:00; cancelled
- "Super zdelka"; Kanal 5 (Interactive Media Services Production); November 2009; Monday - Friday 12:00 - 13:00; cancelled
- "Fërma e jone"/"Nasata farma"; Alsat M (Interactive Media Services Production); May 2010 - June 2010; cancelled
- "Veselata farma"; AB kanal (Interactive Media Services Production); December 2010 - February 2011; cancelled

=== Slovenia ===
- "Srečna linija"; KANAL A (Telemedia InteracTV); cancelled
- "Fantastični klic"; KANAL A (Telemedia InteracTV); cancelled
- "Pokliči in zadeni"; PIKA TV (Telemedia InteracTV); cancelled
- "Evromanija"; KANAL A (Telemedia InteracTV); cancelled
- "Zavrtite Uganite"; TV3 Medias
- "Odpelji Škodo"; GOLICA TV
- "Pokliči in zmagaj"; PopBrio (Telemedia InteracTV); March 2014
- "Srečni klic"; KANAL A (Telemedia InteracTV); July 2014
- "Vem znam zmorem"; Golica TV; 2013

=== Slovakia ===
- "Sexy výhra" http://dajto.markiza.sk/relacie/657940_sexy-vyhra; Dajto, Ring TV (Telemedia InteracTV); 2012 - 2014; cancelled
- "Peniaze na ruku"; Jednotka (Telemedia InteracTV); 2005 - 2006; cancelled
- "5 a pol"; Dvojka (RTVS)
- "Riskni to s JOJ!/PLUS!"/"Riskuj s WAU!"; JOJ, JOJ Plus, WAU (TV JOJ); 2013 - 2015; cancelled
- "Eurominuty"; JOJ Plus, WAU (Telemedia InteracTV); 2014 - 2016; cancelled

=== Italy ===
- VIP TV; cancelled
- Call Game; La7; 2001 - 2002; cancelled
- "Quizissimo"; 7 Gold (Telemedia InteracTV); cancelled
- "Notte D'Oro"; (Telemedia InteracTV); cancelled
- "Quiz Line"; (Telemedia InteracTV); cancelled

=== Poland ===
- "Tele Gra"; TVN, TVN 7 (Endemol Polska); 17 January 2002 - 29 December 2004; cancelled
- "Ale kasa!"; Polsat (9Live); 2008; cancelled
- "Hit the Bank"; TVN Lingua (ITI Group); 2007; cancelled
- "Podróże z zagadkami"; TVP1 (Telemedia InteracTV); 2008; cancelled
- "Noc zagadek"; TVP2 (Telemedia InteracTV); 2008 - 2009, 2010; cancelled
- "Zagadkowa jedynka"; TVP1 (Telemedia InteracTV); May 2010 - September 2010; cancelled
- "Zagraj w kabaret"; TVP1 (Telemedia InteracTV); 2010; cancelled
- "Zagadkowa jedynka"; TVP1 (Green Hat Studios); 20?? - May 2017; cancelled
- "Wielka Wygrana"; Polsat (Telemedia InteracTV); May 2007 - December 2009; cancelled
- "Wygraj fortunę"; TV4 (Telemedia InteracTV); 2007 - 2008; cancelled
- "Wygraj teraz"; Polsat 2 (Telemedia InteracTV); April 2008 - December 2009; cancelled
- "Kasa na Bank"; TV4 (Telemedia InteracTV); 2005 - 2009; cancelled
- "Kup і Wygraj"; Polonia1, Tele5 (Telemedia InteracTV); 10 February 2022 - 25 February 2022; Monday - Friday 13:05 - 13:40; cancelled
- "Zagadkowy Weekend"; Polonia 1 (AP Investment); 18 December 2022 – present; Sunday 14:00 - 16:00
- "Graj o raj"; TVN (ITI Group); 2005; cancelled
- "Nerwy na wodzy"; TVN 7 (ITI Group); 2003; cancelled
- "Apetyt na kasę"; TVN, TVN 7 (ITI Group); 5 January 2009 - 2 September 2011; cancelled
- "Dziewczyny fortuny"; TV4 (Telemedia InteracTV); 2008 - 2009; cancelled
- "Dziewczyny fortuny"; Superstacja (Green Hat Studios); March 2015 - March 2016; cancelled
- "Dziewczyny w bikini"; Polsat (Endemol Polska); 2005 - 2007; cancelled
- "Dziewczyny z fortuną"; TV4 (Telemedia InteracTV); 4 January 2010 - 30 September 2010; cancelled
- "Dziewczyny z fortuną"; TV4 (Green Hat Studios); 1 October 2010 - 30 August 2013; cancelled
- "Dziewczyny z fortuną"; Polsat (Green Hat Studios); 30 August 2013 - 29 March 2014; cancelled
- "Fabryka gry"; TVN, TVN 7, TVN gra (ITI Group); 2006 - 2008; cancelled
- "Fortuna wiedzy"; Polsat (Telemedia InteracTV); 4 January - 3 September 2010; cancelled
- "Garito"; TVN 7, TVN gra (ITI Group); 2005; cancelled
- "Granie na ekranie"; TVN, TVN 7 (ITI Group); 4 January 2010 - 2 September 2011; cancelled
- "Granie na śniadanie"; TVN (ITI Group); 5 January 2009 - 2 September 2011; cancelled
- "Hej-nał show"; TVN, TVN 7, TVN gra (ITI Group); 14 July 2007 - 31 December 2008; cancelled

=== Portugal ===
- "Quando o Telefone Toca" adapted from "Quizmania"; SIC (Fremantle Media Portugal); 2007 - 2010; cancelled
- "Todos em Linha" adapted from "The Mint"; SIC (FremantleMedia Portugal); 2008 - 2009; cancelled
- "Toca a Ganhar"; TVI (Llama TV); 2007 - 2008; cancelled
- "Sempre a Somar" adapted from "Take the Cake"; TVI (Endemol Portugal); 2008 - 2010; cancelled
- "Quem Quer Ganha"; TVI; 2003 - 2010; cancelled
- "Agora é que Conta"; TVI; 2010 - 2012; cancelled
- "Ora Acerta"; TVI (Telemedia InteracTV); 2014 - 2015; cancelled

=== Russia ===
- "Ночной клуб"/"Night Club"; DTV Viasat
- "Лови удачу"/"Catch Success"; MTV Russia (Telemedia InteracTV)
- "Деньги на проводе"/"Money For A Wire"; TNT
- "Ночные игры"/"Night Games"; TNT (Telemedia InteracTV)
- "Культ наличности"/"Cult of cash"; TV-3
- "Киномания"/"Film-mania"; TV-3
- "Лёгкие деньги"/"Сheapjack"; TV Stolica
- "Ночной выигрыш"/"Night prize"; 7TV (Telemedia InteracTV)
- "Поймай удачу"/"Catch good luck"; MTV Russia
- "Быстрый и Умный"; 8TV https://web.archive.org/web/20140813005336/http://8tv.ru/pdfdoc.pdf (Telemedia InteracTV); 20?? - August 2014; cancelled
- "Счастливчик на проводе"; Bridge Tv, Rusong Tv (Telemedia InteracTV); 1 July 2016 - 12 August 2016; cancelled

=== Spain ===
- "Llamada Interactiva"; cancelled
- "Adivina quién gana esta noche"; Antena 3 (Llama TV); cancelled
- "Llámame"; Cuatro (Llama TV); cancelled
- "La llamada millonaria"; Cuatro; cancelled
- "Contamos contigo"; Cuatro; cancelled
- "¡Uau!"; Cuatro; cancelled
- "Marca y gana"; Cuatro; cancelled
- "Llama y gana"; Telecinco; cancelled
- "Telecinco ¿dígame?"; Telecinco; cancelled
- "Noche de suerte"; Telecinco; cancelled
- "Si lo aciertas, ganas"; Telecinco; cancelled
- "Lluvia de euros"; Telecinco; cancelled
- "Aprende Español"; laSexta; cancelled
- "Despierta y gana"; laSexta; cancelled
- "Ganas de ganar"; laSexta; cancelled
- "Gana ahora"; laSexta; cancelled
- "TRUCA I ENCERTA"; 8TV (Telemedia InteracTV); cancelled
- "Llamar y Ganar"; VEO TV (Telemedia InteracTV); cancelled
- "La Noche Es Tuya"; Neox (Telemedia InteracTV); July 2018; cancelled
- "Llama y Gana"; Hit TV (Telemedia InteracTV); June 2020; cancelled
- "Tiki Ticket"; Ten (Telemedia InteracTV); 24 June 2022 - 30 June 2022; cancelled

=== United Kingdom ===
Current Quiz Channels

- ITV Quiz
- Challenge

Former Quiz Programmes & Channels

- Avago
- The Big Deal
- Big Game TV
- Bikini Beach
- Cash Call (The Hits)
- Cash House
- Eureka
- Glitterball (ITV)
- Grab A Grand
- ITV Play
- Play DJ (ITV)
- Quiz Beat
- Quiz Call (Five)
- Quizmania
- Quiz Nation (ITV)
- Quiz Night Live (Ftn)
- Quiz TV
- Quiz World (Smile TV)
- Sky Quiz Live (Sky One)
- Sweet & Sassy
- The Call (ITV)
- The Daily Quiz (Big Game TV, ITV Play, Men & Motors)
- The Great Big British Quiz
- The Hallmark Channel Quiz (Hallmark channel)
- The Mint (ITV Play)
- Make Your Play (ITV)
- This Morning Puzzle Book (ITV Play)
- The Zone (ITV Play)
- TV Bingo

== Africa ==
=== Nigeria ===
- "Quiz Line"

=== South Africa ===
- "Sms & Win"; Etv (Telemedia InteracTV); 12 February 2022 - 31 August 2025; cancelled

== Asia ==
=== Philippines ===
- "123 Quizz"

=== Iran ===
- "زنگ و پیر"; Win tv (Telemedia InteracTV); 10 May 2021 - February 2022; cancelled
