= Play TV =

Play TV or PlayTV may refer to:

- PlayTV, a DVB-T tuner peripheral for the PlayStation 3
- Play TV (game show), a 2009–2010 Irish phone-in quiz show, with versions in other countries
- PlayTV (Brazilian TV channel), a Brazilian channel focused on games, anime and music
- Play TV (Pakistani TV channel), a music channel based in Pakistan

== See also ==
- Psychic Readings Live, an interactive show that succeeded Play TV in its time slot on its channel in Ireland
