= My GamesFever =

- Presented by: Kourtney Brown; Natalia Castellanos; Erin Myers; Nikki Stanzione; Chris Underwood; Charlie Venturi
- Country of origin: United States
- No. of episodes: 105

Production
- Running time: 2 hours
- Production companies: Shine Matrix; 20th Television

Original release
- Network: Fox-owned MyNetworkTV stations
- Release: December 4, 2006 – April 20, 2007

My GamesFever was a live daytime interactive game show formerly aired on MyNetworkTV stations owned by the Fox Television Stations Group. Featured in the two-hour program were interactive games where the viewers could win cash prizes. The show aired from 1 p.m. – 3 p.m, in two separate feeds (Eastern and Pacific) every Monday through Friday.

== Format ==
On My GamesFever, the contestants were home viewers. American residents 18 or older could enter the contest by text messaging a request or using the network's website. Potential contestants could enter up to twenty-five times per phone number on each show.

After a few moments, a contestant was notified whether or not their entry is chosen (at random) to proceed to another random selection process. If an entry was selected in the second phase, the contestant was called on his or her home or mobile phone, depending on the method of entry. The contestant then came on-air and was given a chance to play.

Contestant selection was based on call volume, as reflected by an on-screen thermometer. When the thermometer reached a certain level, or after a certain amount of time, a caller was selected to play the game. A $.99 fee was charged for each text message entry, in addition to standard text messaging rates charged by the wireless provider. Entries on the website were free. Regardless of the method of entry, each entry had an equal chance of being selected. Residents of certain states were ineligible to play various entry methods.

== Programming history ==
The show premiered online on December 4, 2006 and began its television broadcasting one week later. The program aired without commercials.

The show ended on April 20, 2007 with 105 episodes with the last episode having all on air personalities on the show.

My GamesFever was broadcast from Miami, Florida, under a grant from the Governor's Office of Film and Entertainment. and was produced by Shine Matrix Limited in association with 20th Television.

== Games ==
My GamesFever featured various minigames that were played throughout the program. The rewards for the games were usually cash prizes ranging from $200 – $500 in cash. Most games were word games, featuring variations on anagrams, word searches, crosswords and fill-in-the-blanks.

== See also ==
- PlayMania
- Quiznation
- 100 Winners
- Midnight Money Madness
- Take the Cake
- Play2Win (also known as Text2Win)
