= You're Back in the Room =

British television game show with hypnotized guests

- Genre: Game show
- Presented by: Phillip Schofield
- Starring: Keith Barry
- Country of origin: United Kingdom
- Original language: English
- No. of series: 2
- No. of episodes: 8

Production
- Running time: 60 minutes (inc. adverts)
- Production company: Tuesday's Child

Original release
- Network: ITV
- Release: 14 March 2015 – 9 April 2016

You're Back in the Room is a British television game show that was broadcast on ITV from 14 March 2015 to 9 April 2016. The show is hosted by Phillip Schofield and starred Keith Barry. The premise consists of contestants who have to complete a series of normally straightforward tasks after being subject to "deep hypnosis", causing them to be compelled to develop various distracting tics or quirks that hinder their ability to compete.

A second series consisting of four episodes was announced on 21 July 2015 and began airing on 12 March 2016.

On 7 October 2016, it was announced that the show had been axed.

== Episodes ==
=== Series 1 (2015) ===
No.	Guests	Original release date	Viewers (millions)
1	Ed Baines, Paul Rankin, Lesley Waters, Aldo Zilli	14 March 2015	4.24
2	Samia Smith, Nigel Pivaro, Jack P. Shepherd, Ryan Thomas	21 March 2015	4.06
3	Joe Swash, Vicki Michelle, Vincent Simone	28 March 2015	3.93
4	Diversity	4 April 2015	3.24

=== Series 2 (2016) ===
No.	Guests	Original release date	Viewers (millions)
1	Andrea McLean, Linda Robson, Sherrie Hewson, Nadia Sawalha and Kaye Adams	12 March 2016	3.20
2	Chris Kamara	19 March 2016	3.16
3	Joey Essex and Carl Fogarty	2 April 2016	2.58
4	Antony Cotton and Jennie McAlpine	9 April 2016	3.12

== Reception ==
The show has received mixed reviews; Sarah Deen, in a Metro article, summarised that "everyone either completely loved or absolutely hated [the show]". Adam Postans described You're Back in the Room as "one of the worst prime-time shows you'll ever see" in a Daily Mirror article. Sam Wollaston gave the programme a mixed review, describing it as "quite funny for a while", but said it went "backwards from Brown to McKenna". Ben Travis of the Evening Standard described the show as "watchably daft". Benji Wilson from The Daily Telegraph gave the show a very positive review, opining that it is "significantly funnier than anything else on TV".

== International versions ==
Country	Title	Presenter	Hypnotist	Broadcaster	Aired
Australia	You're Back in the Room	Daryl Somers	(Republic of Ireland) Keith Barry	Nine Network	3–25 April 2016
Colombia	Hipnosis un juego de mente	Victor Mallarino	(Egypt) Mustafa Badawy	RCN	15 May 2016
France	Hypnose le Grand Jeu	Stephane Rotenberg	Cyrille Arnaud	W9; M6 (from 30 December 2015)	9 October 2015
Netherlands	You're Back in the Room	Beau van Erven Dorens	Rinke Jacobs	RTL 4	2015
New Zealand	You're Back in the Room	Jason Gunn	(United Kingdom) Peter Powers	TV2	21 July 2016
Poland	Hipnoza	Filip Chajzer	Artur Makieła	TVN	3 March 2018
Portugal	DivertidaMente	João Manzarra	(Spain) José Tejada	SIC	11 March 2018
Slovenia	Hipnoza dobra zabava	Boštjan Romih	Božidar Grilc	POP TV	29 January 2017
United States	Hypnotize Me	Taye Diggs	(Republic of Ireland) Keith Barry	The CW	2019
