= Čarli TV =

Slovenian television channel

ČARLI TV
- Country: Slovenia

Ownership
- Sister channels: TV Petelin; Golica TV

History
- Launched: March 1, 2002; 23 years ago

Čarli TV is a Slovenian music television station. Its broadcasts started on 1 March 2002, with a format akin to MTV's. In its first month on air, it was not yet registered in ratings measurements, but advertising and viewer response was overwhelming.

TV SHOWS

- Dinamit
- Aktual Naglas,
- Beatz,
- Frishno,
- Brihta
