= You're Back in the Room (Australian game show) =

- Genre: Game show
- Based on: You're Back in the Room
- Presented by: Daryl Somers
- Starring: Keith Barry
- Country of origin: Australia
- Original language: English
- No. of series: 1
- No. of episodes: 5

Production
- Production location: Fox Studios Australia
- Production company: FremantleMedia

Original release
- Network: Nine Network
- Release: 3 April – 25 April 2016

You're Back in the Room is an Australian television game show based on the British TV show of the same name that began being aired on the Nine Network on 3 April 2016. It is hosted by Daryl Somers and hypnotist Keith Barry who is the hypnotist on the British version.

== Format ==
The contestants have the opportunity to win cash prizes while being under the influence of hypnotism. Hypnotist Keith Barry puts each one under hypnosis to thwart their efforts. Over five rounds, the contestants take part in a series of outrageous games where tasks need to be completed in order to win. Their cash pot accumulates throughout the show before they attempt to win as much as possible in a fast-paced final round.

The contestants are all competing for $20,000, but may lose money if they do not succeed in a set number of challenges that need to be completed successfully in order to accumulate prize earnings.

== Episodes ==
=== Episode One round ===
Details	Round					
Details	1	2	3	4	5	6
Contestants	Sharon, Nick, Julia, David					
Celebrity Guests	—			Derryn Hinch; Tegan Martin; Gamble Breaux; Matthew Buntine		—
Game	"Music Quiz"	"Paint a Picture"	"Blow up Balloons"	"Beauty Therapists"	"Milliners"	"The Clock Drop"
Description	Each contestant has to answer two questions each, each question they get correct they receive $250	Each contestant has to paint a picture and the other contestants must guess what it is, each picture they get correct they receive $1000	Together the contestants must blow up balloons, for each balloon blown up they will receive $250	Each contestant must makeover a celebrity each, if the celebrity is satisfied they will receive $1000	Each contestant must design a hat for a celebrity, if the celebrity is satisfied with it they will receive $1000	Each contestant must stand under four clocks which will drop bouncy balls which they must catch, not pick up, and put them in a bowl, the more balls they catch the more money they keep
Result	6 / 8 questions correct $1500 / $2000 + 4 / 4 bonus questions correct $1000 / $1000	4 / 4 guesses correct $4000 / $4000	16 / 20 balloons blown up $4000 / $5000	4 / 4 celebrities satisfied $4000 / $4000	4 / 4 celebrities satisfied $4000 / $4000	Enough balls to keep the whole Cash Pot
Running Cash Pot	$2,500	$6,500	$10,500	$14,500	$18,500	Final Pot $18,500

Contestants	Round					
Contestants	1	2	3	4	5	6
Contestants	Hypnosis					
Sharon, 46 Council Worker	"Believe she's in love with host Darryl Somers and he's going to propose"	"Must use her body to paint with"	"Believe she's walking on a tight rope"	"Thinks she's a celebrity hair stylist and is creating her latest 'masterpiece' on Tegan Martin's hair"	"Thinks Derryn Hinch's head is gigantic"	"Believe she's in slow motion"
Nick, 25 Insurance Manager	"Will play air guitar when he hears the word 'air'"	"Will hide his painting from everyone except Julia"	"Thinks the balloons are filled with helium"	"Thinks Matt Buntine has extreme foot odour"	"Must play frisbee with the hat he's creating for Gamble Breaux when he hears the word 'Nick'"	"Thinks the balls are hot coals"
Julia, 23 Personal Trainer	"Believe she's a pop diva"	"Thinks the colour yellow is hilarious"	"Believe she gets blown around when she inflates a balloon"	"Believe she's unbelievably happy and must give Gamble Breaux a manicure"	"Must wrap Tegan Martin like a mummy"	"Thinks she's riding a bucking horse"
David, 48 Airport Safety Officer	"Believe he's Elvis Presley"	"Believe he's a pretentious art critic"	"Thinks he's naked"	"Thinks he's a masseuse and fortune teller and believes he's predicting Derryn Hinch's future"	"Must set the feathers free when he sees a frisbee"	"Believe he's lost in maze"
All Four	"All dance when they hear music"	—	"All must hide when a balloon pops"	—		"Believe their all on a ship on rough seas"

=== Episode Two rounds ===
Details	Round					
Details	1	2	3	4	5	6
Contestants	Tyler, Renee, Mark, Montanna					
Celebrity Guests						
Game	"General Knowledge Quiz"	"Making Banana Splits"	"Florists"	"Cocktail Bar"	"Restaurant Waiters"	"The Clock Drop"
Description	Each contestant has to answer two questions each, each question they get correct they receive $250	Each Contestant must make as many banana splits as they can, each banana split is worth $200	The Team works together to make flower bouquets, each bouquet is worth $500	The Team Must Serve Drinks to the Guests, each Drink is worth $200	The Team Must Serve Food to Celebrity’s each full plate is $1,000	Each contestant must stand under four clocks which will drop bouncy balls which they must catch, not pick up, and put them in a bowl, the more balls they catch the more money they keep
Result	8/8 questions correct $2000/$2000 + 4/5 bonus questions correct $800/$1000	19/20 Banana Splits Made $3,800	8/10 Boquetes Made $4,000	20/20 Cocktails Served $4,000	4 Full Plates of Food $4,000	Enough balls to keep the whole cashpot
Running Cash Pot	$2,800	$6,600	$10,600	$14,600	$18,600	Final Pot $18,600

Contestants	Round					
Contestants	1	2	3	4	5	6
Contestants	Hypnosis					
Tyler	Gets an Electric Shock When He Hears “Ding”	Believes Chocolate Sauce is a Face moisturizer	Is A Super Spy and Daryl is his partner	Is a Huge Fan of Erin	Believes the Guest are Toddlers who need help cutting up and eating their food	Thinks The balls on the ground are scary spiders
Renee	Thinks Daryl is Hilarious	She Hides any Cherries she sees	Thinks Everything Daryl says is a lie	Kicks out anyone new who enters	Believes she’s lost her wedding ring in the food	Has a fear of walking forwards and will only walk backwards
Mark	Gives Tea and Coffee orders when he hears the letter “t”	Takes a bite out of a banana split without using his hands when he hears the service bell	Believes he’s a Rhythmic Gymnast and does a routine when he picks up a ribbon	Gets Colder When he adds ice	Is in a Earthquake	Is a Walking Talking Robot
Montana	Gets a Uncontrollable Itch when She Hears “Ding”	Becomes a Gorilla when she peels a banana	Does He loves me, He loves me not with the flowers	Has a Bungee Tied around her	Celebrates widely with the Champagne	Believes Daryl is Hiding balls in his pockets
All Four						They Believe The Celling is Crashing in

=== Episode Three rounds ===
Details	Round					
Details	1	2	3	4	5	6
Contestants	Dan, Jenny, Natasha, Leo					
Celebrity Guests	—			Luke & Ebony from The Block		—
Game	"Cake Decorating"	"Movie Quiz"	"Footy Pass"	"Paint a Fence"	"Make a Bed"	"The Clock Drop"
Description	Each contestant make decorate four cakes each, each cake they complete they receive $250	Each contestant must answer a question, for each question they get correct they receive $250 & $200 each for bonus round	The contestants must pass footballs down a line with the last contestant in the line throwing it in a target, each ball they get in they receive $250	Each contestant must paint a fence each, Luke & Ebony will evaluate their fence and give them a cash prize up to $1000 or less	Each contestant must make and decorate a bed each, Luke & Ebony will evaluate their bed and give them a cash prize up to $1000 or less	Each contestant must stand under four clocks which will drop bouncy balls which they must catch, not pick up, and put them in a bowl, the more balls they catch the more money they keep
Result	13 / 16 cakes completed $3250 / $4000	6 / 8 questions correct $1500 / $2000 + 3 / 5 bonus questions correct $600 / $1000	15 balls in the target Total - $3750	D: $1000; N: $1000; J: $1000; L: $1000; Total - $4000	D: $800; N: $600; J: $1000; L: $1000; Total - $3400	Enough balls to keep the whole cashpot
Running Cash Pot	$3,250	$5,350	$9,100	$13,100	$16,500	Final Pot $16,500

Contestants	Round					
Contestants	1	2	3	4	5	6
Contestants	Hypnosis					
Dan, 29 Disability Worker	"Must plant his face in a cake when he hears 'finished chef'"	"Will dance everytime he hears music"	"Mist hide the balls up his shirt"	"Believes his paintbrush has a mind of its own and struggles to control it"	"Thinks he's extremely tired and will lay in the bed but will wake up when Darryl says his name"	"Whenever the clocks flash and change he will do 'The Worm' dance
Jenny, 48 Nurse	"Believes she's an expert baker and will give orders"	"Thinks her shoe is a phone when she hears a 'ding' sound"	"Finds it hilarious she can't catch the balls"	"Thinks the colour blue is offence and will try to hide it"	"Believes Ebony is a fairytale princess"	"Believes she's an Irish dancer and will dance for the audience"
Natasha, 35 Teacher	"Will go crazy with lollies when she hears 'finished chef'"	"Thinks she is watching her favourite movie"	"Believes the footballs are delicate breakable vases"	"Thinks she is madly in love with Luke and will flirt with him"	"Believes she is 5 years old and wants to play with everyone"	"Thinks one of her hands is frozen to Dan at all times"
Leo, 26 Firefighter	"Believes the cake bases are extremely hot"	"Thinks he desperately needs the toilet until he reaches the side of the stage"	"Believes Darryl is a football coach that he must impress"	"Believes his a free spirit and will use his body as the paintbrush"	"Thinks the toys are scary monsters that have come to life"	"Believes he is a member of the Harlem Globetrotters Basketball team"
All Four	—		"They will all kick the balls and celebrate on the sound of a whistle"	—		"Believe they are Formula One racing car drivers"

=== Episode Four rounds ===
Details	Round					
Details	1	2	3	4	5	6
Contestants						
Celebrity Guests						
Game	"Sports Quiz"	"Hanging Washing"	"Pizza Makers"			"The Clock Drop"
Description	Each contestant must answer a question, for each question they get correct they receive $250 & $200 each for bonus round					Each contestant must stand under four clocks which will drop bouncy balls which they must catch, not pick up, and put them in a bowl, the more balls they catch the more money they keep
Result	8/8 questions correct $2,000/$2000 + 5/5 bonus questions correct $1,000/$1,000	20/20 Items on the line $4,000/$4,000	10/10 Pizzas Made $5,000/$5,000			
Running Cash Pot	$3,000	$7,000	$12,000	$16,000	$20,000	

Contestants	Round					
Contestants	1	2	3	4	5	6
Contestants	Hypnosis					
Scott	Believes He is a Sports Commentator	Believes all clothes weigh 1000 kilograms				
Ryan	Believes He is a Professional Cheerleader	Believes He is Naked				
Kelly	Believes her kids a playing soccer and will celebrate when she hears “ding”	When She picks up a sheet she becomes a Superhero	Will Hide Ingredients			
Stephanie	Believes She’s a Speed Walking Fanatic and Does a lap of the track when she hears “Ding”	Believes Daryl is No Wearing Underpants	Is a Professional Chef who tosses salami and will throw a pizza away when her name is said			
All Four						

=== Episode Five rounds ===
Details	Round					
Details	1	2	3	4	5	6
Contestants						
Celebrity Guests						
Game						
Description						
Result						
Running Cash Pot	$2,750	$6,750	$10,500	$14,500	$18,500	

Contestants	Round					
Contestants	1	2	3	4	5	6
Contestants	Hypnosis					
TBA						
TBA						
TBA						
TBA						
All Four						

== Ratings ==
No.	Title	Air date	Timeslot	Overnight ratings		Ref(s)
No.	Title	Air date	Timeslot	Viewers	Rank	Ref(s)
1	Episode 1	3 April 2016	Sunday 7pm	1,155,000	2	
2	Episode 2	10 April 2016	Sunday 7pm	890,000	5	
3	Episode 3	17 April 2016	Sunday 7pm	801,000	7	
4	Episode 4	24 April 2016	Sunday 7pm	587,000	7	
5	Episode 5	25 April 2016	Monday 7:30pm	565,000	16	
