= Keith Barry =

Irish mentalist, hypnotist, magician and activist

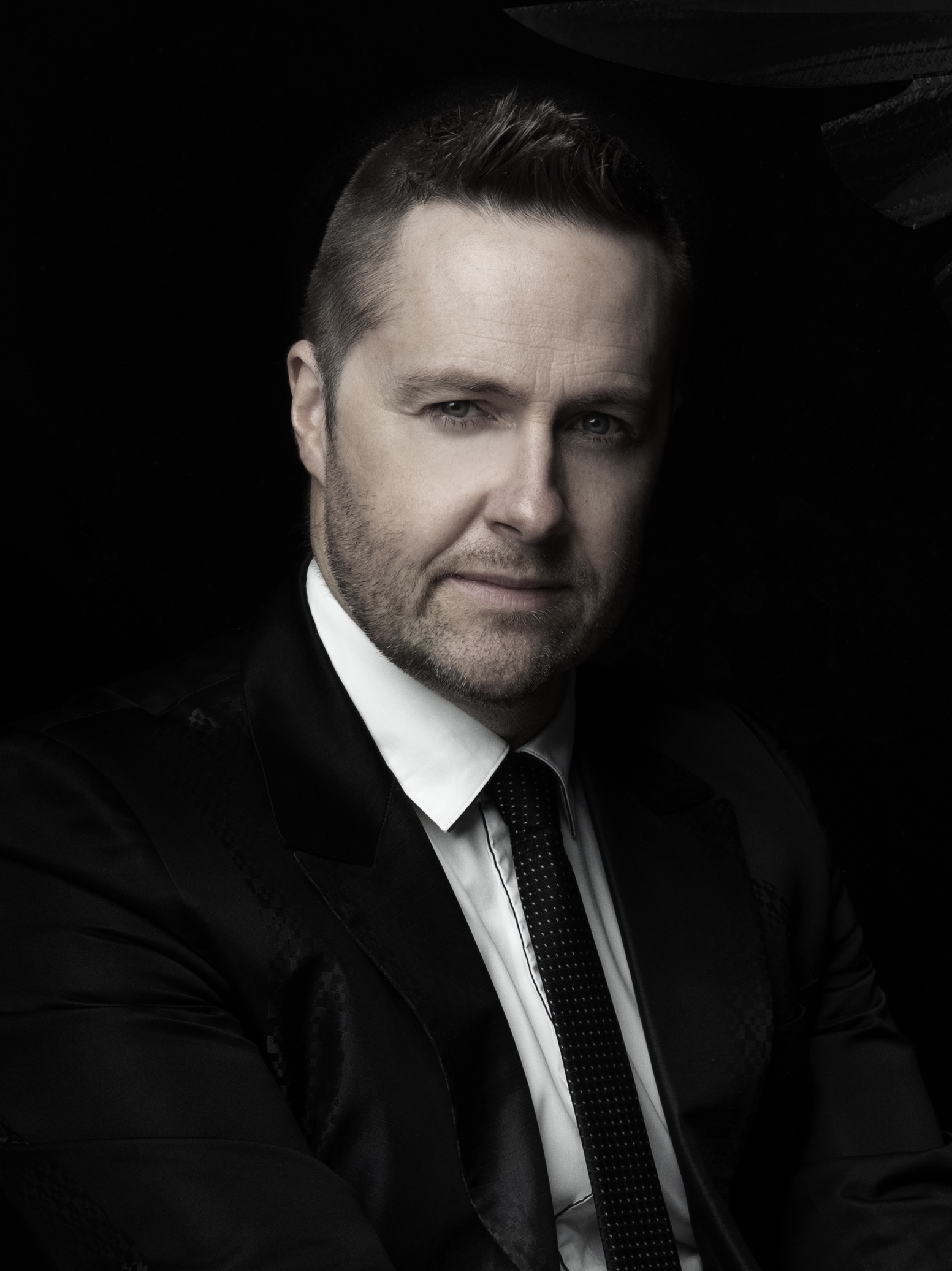
- Born: Keith Patrick Barry; 2 October 1976 (age 49); Waterford, Ireland
- Occupations: Illusionist, mentalist
- Years active: 2003–present
- Website: www.keithbarry.com

Keith Patrick Barry (born 2 October 1976) is an Irish mentalist, hypnotist, magician and activist for the elderly.

== Early life ==
Born in Williamstown, Waterford, Ireland, Keith's interest in magic began at the age of 5 with a Paul Daniel's magic set. He started performing semi-professionally at the age of 15, inspired by the tricks he learned from a book entitled Magic for the complete Klutz.

Keith graduated from NUI Galway in 1998 with an honours chemistry degree, but left his science career behind in the year 2000 to pursue a career in entertainment and motivational speaking.

== Career ==
Barry's television career began with a series entitled Close Encounters with Keith Barry, which ran from 2003–2005. The show originally aired in Europe and has since aired in 28 countries worldwide.

In 2004, Barry starred in his own MTV television special entitled Brainwashed. 2005 ended with his TV show Keith Barry Live With Friends which featured various celebrities such as magician Billy McComb, Jim Corr of The Corrs, and The Conway Sisters.

Barry's success throughout Europe coupled with his MTV special led to a four-year multi-special deal with CBS. His first special with CBS debuted on 12 May 2006 and was entitled Keith Barry: Extraordinary. The special later aired on New Year's Eve 2006 on The CW and on New Year's Day 2007 on TV3 in New Zealand and the Arena channel in Australia.

Following an Irish tour along with a week in Dublin's Vicar Street, Barry and his longtime manager Eamonn Maguire were badly injured in a car crash on the Belfast to Newry road on 1 March 2007. Barry suffered severe trauma to his left leg but returned to the stage later the same year at Vicar Street.

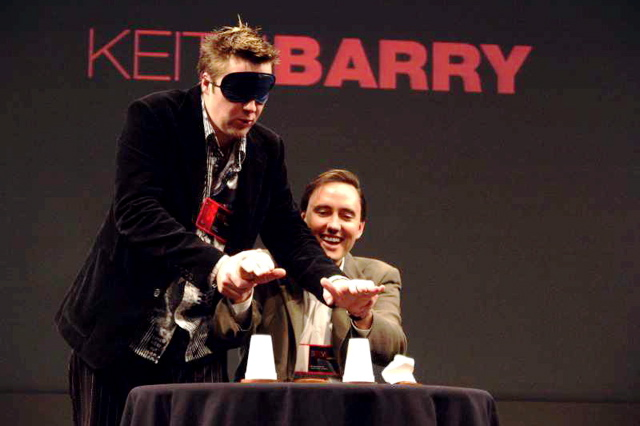
A blindfolded Barry performs during a TED Talk in 2004

Barry's TED talk is in the top 20 most viewed TED Talks of all time and follows from his first ever live stage performance which was at TED in Monterey, California in 2004. He returned to TED in 2005 and was the special guest performer then on the opening night.

On 29 December 2007, Barry performed in a live Saturday night prime-time special on ITV in the UK titled Keith Barry - The Escape Live. The finale of the show featured an escape from a shed rigged with explosives. Barry was tied to a chair with thick ropes by two members of the audience. One of these was Glen Gathard, noted for hoping that Keith Barry would not make it out of the explosion. Participants lit a fuse, started a two-minute countdown, and carried the chair into the shed. Workmen hammered additional wood to cover the door and windows from the outside, then left the scene when one minute remained on the countdown. After the countdown was complete, the shed exploded, then the camera changed to reveal Keith safely on top of a gantry some distance away.

Barry has performed live on The Ellen DeGeneres Show seven times and The Paul O'Grady Show four times.

In February 2010, Barry finished a pilot for a new series on The Discovery Channel in the US. The show is called Deception with Keith Barry and the pilot aired in July 2010. The show was picked up for a season and premiered on 31 May 2011 with 4 one-hour shows, "Black Ops", "Used Car Salesman", "Cops and Robbers", and "Daring and Dating". The show premiered on 6 October 2011 in Taiwan, 1 November in Japan, 3 November on Quest in the UK, on 7 December in Southeast Asia and Hong Kong, 13 December in Australia and New Zealand and in India in February 2012.

Also in 2010 and 2011, Keith toured with his live show "The Asylum", which finished its run in May 2011. On this tour, Keith set the record as the most successful solo act ever to play The Olympia Theatre in Dublin. On 13 July 2011, his "Keith Barry - 8 Deadly Sins" show opened to critical acclaim and a standing ovation at the Olympia Theatre in Dublin and ran for 5 weeks, setting new box office records during the run. It was followed by a national tour in Jan/Feb 2012.

In June 2012, Barry stated his disapproval of TV's late-night anti-intellectual offering Psychic Readings Live and challenged one of its presenters, Psychic Wayne, to prove his psychic powers. (Wayne declined.)

Barry advised Woody Harrelson for his role as a mentalist in the 2013 film, Now You See Me, and again for its 2016 sequel, Now You See Me 2. Barry prepped Harrelson for a successful performance on the Late Show with David Letterman during the marketing of the first film.

Keith's hit show The Dark Side launched with a 31 date sold-out tour in Jan/Feb 2013 and continued with a 12 night run at the Olympia in Dublin in July 2013. On 23 July, Keith took time out to give a talk at the Science Gallery in Dublin and demonstrated the techniques of cold reading and explained how "psychics" can convince so many people that they can read minds.

In 2014, Barry starred on TV3 with his show Brain Hacker, which featured distinguished guests from the world of magic including Tony 'Doc' Shiels, Max Maven and Uri Geller.

Between 2015 and 2016, Barry starred as the hypnotist on the ITV game show You're Back in the Room hosted by Phillip Schofield. He was also the hypnotist on the Australian version on Nine Network hosted by Daryl Somers, and starred in the U.S. version on The CW network hosted by Taye Diggs.

2018 saw the return of Barry to RTE1 prime time TV, where he hosted the New Year's Eve special, followed in 2019 with his 4 part series RTE The Keith Barry Experience.

Barry's first book Brain Hacks was published in 2021 and reached number 1 in Ireland for best selling non-fiction paperback.

The second series of The Keith Barry Experience aired in 2022.

== Acting ==
As an actor, Barry performed in the "Open Water" episode of CSI: Miami in 2006.

== Presenting ==
In 2009, Barry hosted the Irish version of Deal or No Deal on TV3.

== Activism against elderly abuse ==
Barry's grandfather, 82, was attacked in his home in Waterford by burglars in 2009, later dying of his wounds. Barry and his father launched a high-profile campaign to stamp out abuse against the elderly in their homes, said the government was "insulting" the elderly and said he would "bring the country to a halt" Pundits referred to the incident in discussions of laws about the actions people can legally take to defend themselves in their homes.
