= Psychic Readings Live =

- Screenshot with Countess Nadia Starella
- Presented by: Flathan; Psychic Wayne Isaacs; Countess Nadia Starella; Sue Hudd; Erik Révi; Sam; Diane Lazarus; Grant Colyer; Jeannette Dupont; Ali Austin; Theo Ljubich; Amira Celon; Papa Wango; Djaly; Iris; Danielle; Psychic John; Joanna; Simone; Martina Kramer; Carole Davis; Warren
- Country of origin: Hungary
- No. of series: 1
- No. of episodes: 134

Production
- Running time: 2 hours
- Production company: Eso TV

Original release
- Network: TV3
- Release: 16 June – 3 December 2012

Related
- Play TV

Psychic Readings Live is a live, two-hour phone-in television programme that aired on Ireland's TV3 network at midnight from 16 June to 3 December 2012. Just over two years after TV3 removed Play TV from its schedule, the network began airing Psychic Readings Live in the programme's time slot. Newspaper reports compared the controversy generated by Psychic Readings Live to the scandal caused by Play TV: "It will remind TV3 of a past life".

Produced by Eso.tv, the programme invited viewers to dial a premium-rate telephone line costing €2.44 per minute. The line gave them a chance to communicate with a team of in-studio psychics who offered predictions of future events. Psychic Readings Live attracted criticism for the number of hoax calls from viewers and its use of seemingly-stock photographs of its psychics. Concerns were also expressed about the nature of some predictions, including one in which a woman was told her property would catch fire.

On 17 July 2012, the Irish Examiner reported that the Broadcasting Authority of Ireland (BAI) had the programme "on their radar" following a number of complaints to TV3. Four complaints were upheld against the programme on 9 November 2012. The show was cancelled on 3 December 2012, with its final broadcast airing in that day's overnight slot.

== Controversy ==
The identities of the team of alleged off-screen clairvoyants were scrutinised after a blogger, Alan Rice, sifted through the programme's online images of its off-screen psychics and discovered that it was using stock photographs. His comments led to complaints of false advertising and inspired a lengthy discussion thread on the boards.ie internet forum, where users posted screenshots of some images. On 22 June, the website JOE.ie reported that the discussion board had 2,700 posts within six days of the programme's premiere.

A number of hoax callers contacted Psychic Readings Live, the first within days of the programme's launch. The hoax callers sometimes asked apparently-genuine questions, and then told the psychic they did not believe the reading or verbally abused them. The Irish Times reported that a viewer phoned the show impersonating Will Smith's character on the U.S. television series The Fresh Prince of Bel-Air, footage of which was posted on YouTube. Another concluded her call: "They don’t have Play TV anymore so I can’t try and lose my money, okay. I’ll try and save it...I’ll be in touch with BAI soon."

Illusionist Keith Barry, expressing his disapproval of Psychic Readings Live, challenged one of its presenters (Psychic Wayne) to a magic duel. Declining the invitation, Psychic Wayne gave an equally lighthearted response: he claimed to be bowing to the greater force of Keith Barry, maintaining that such a battle (should it ever occur) would have irreparable consequences for the universe.

Conor Pope, consumer protection writer for The Irish Times, called Psychic Readings Live in July 2012 and asked Psychic Wayne about a concern that someone with whom he is connected in his work was stealing other people's money; he was promptly disconnected. Pope expressed his concerns about the programme in an article on 17 July: "The show appears to attract vulnerable and unhappy people looking in all the wrong places for answers, and then charges them staggering amounts of money for readings of questionable merit. There have been growing calls from bemused viewers for it to be axed. The growing controversy is not unlike the one which engulfed Play TV, an infomercial "quiz" night that TV3 eventually scrapped after complaints, fines and mountains of bad press."

In response to criticism TV3 sought to distance itself from Psychic Readings Live, issuing a statement on 26 June 2012 that it had no responsibility for the programme's content and describing it as an infomercial. Eso.tv described the show as "for entertainment purposes only", although this was not emphasised by the presenters.

On 17 July 2012, the Irish Examiner reported that the Broadcasting Authority of Ireland was monitoring the programme after a number of complaints to TV3. Complaints about a show on air for less than 30 days are referred to the broadcaster concerned, and if a complainant is not satisfied with the broadcaster's response after that period they can then contact the BAI. On 17 July Psychic Readings Live reached the 30-day deadline, and the BAI said the show was "on their radar".

In the same Examiner article concerns were expressed by the charity Age Action Ireland, which feared that elderly and isolated people might be calling the programme for human contact and accruing large phone bills. Age Action Ireland urged that the cost of the calls be highlighted, and for relatives of those living alone to try and ease their feelings of isolation. On 2 October a complainant tweeted the BAI decision; The Journal.ie picked it up for an article.

In November, journalist Paul Melia spent €80 in a half-hour when researching an article for the Irish Independent. He spoke to three psychics—an on-air presenter named Flathan; privately, "a pleasant Scottish woman" named Marticia and "a young, attractive black woman" with "a filthy cough" named Luminous—who informed him that his wife would become insane, his dog ("a small, shaggy-haired dog, not the kind you would see or hear") would die and he would change jobs: "one to help pay the hefty phone bill, and hopefully it won't be the Irish Independent's paranormal correspondent", he concluded.

== Complaints and cancellation ==
On 11 September 2012, the Broadcasting Authority of Ireland met to review complaints by individuals concerning Psychic Readings Live. Two complaints were upheld, since the BAI General Commercial Communications Code Section 8.10.4 states that claims pertaining to health, cures and/or healing are not permitted. The decisions were formalised in writing on 28 September, and Psychic Readings Live's BAI statement was broadcast on 5 October at 00.14 (immediately before the show).

On 9 November BAI upheld four viewer complaints concerning Psychic Readings Live, including two pregnancy predictions and one in which a woman was told that her flat would burn down. TV3 responded it was "allowed to sell three hours of infomercial airtime to any advertiser. TV3 sells the time to the advertiser who will pay most for it. This is not television programming time. TV3 has no responsibility for editorial content in infomercials so long as the content meets applicable laws and regulations". However, the broadcaster subsequently said it would contact Eso.tv and take the show off air if Eso could not prove it complied with the broadcasting regulations. By 3 December, the BAI had upheld seven complaints against the programme; TV3 cancelled it, with the final broadcast that night. TV3 then replaced what it called the "commercial window" in which Psychic Readings Live had aired with regular programming.

== See also ==
- Ann O'Delia Diss Debar ("One of the most extraordinary fake mediums... the world has ever known" -Houdini)
- Bob Nygaard (Psychic fraud investigator)
- Cold reading
- Flim-Flam! (Psychics, ESP, Unicorns and other Delusions)
- Fortune telling fraud
- Houdini's debunking of psychics and mediums
- Hot reading
- List of topics characterized as pseudoscience
- Psychic Blues: Confessions of a Conflicted Medium
- Psychic Friends Network
- Psychic reading
- Rose Mackenberg (Historic fraudulent psychic medium investigator)
