= Play2Win =

- Also known as: Text2Win
- Created by: 3 Circles Media
- Presented by: Amber Vineyard; Tara Cummins; Elizabeth (substitute host on the USA version, regular host on the Canada version)
- Country of origin: United States

Production
- Running time: 60 minutes (including commercials)

Original release
- Network: Superstation WGN; WPIX-TV; WSFL-TV; WPHL-TV
- Release: August 14, 2006 – March 10, 2007

Play2Win (originally called Text2Win) was a live interactive game show that originally aired from 2 a.m - 3 a.m. Eastern Time on stations owned by Tribune Broadcasting. It moved to the 3 a.m. - 4 a.m. timeslot on February 27, 2007, where it remained until the show ended on March 10, 2007. The one-hour program featured interactive games where the viewers could win cash prizes.

== Show Information ==
The show originally aired on a week-long trial basis as Text2Win on WPIX-TV in New York City from August 14–18, 2006, and returned as a permanent series with its new name on October 17, 2006.

=== Production format and rules ===
Play2Win was a game show, hosted by Kansas born, Holland-residing actress Tara Cummins and Los Angeles television hostess Amber Vineyard, where the contestants were home viewers. American residents over eighteen could enter the contest by text messaging a request (for a fee of $1.50 plus cellphone charges), dialing a 1-900 number (also a $1.50 fee), or by using the online form. A person could enter up to ten times per game regardless of entry method. Entries had an equal chance of selection, regardless of the means of entry. If selected, the registrant would be called and become a participant. The on-air contestant had the chance to play the game for cash.

The program was produced by 3Circles Media.

=== Broadcast history ===
The show went national on Chicago's Superstation WGN cable network on October 24, 2006 (it never aired on the broadcast Channel 9 in the Chicago area), while also airing on WPIX in the New York City area. It was taken off the air nationally on January 19, 2007 and became exclusive to WPIX in New York City only. On February 13, 2007 WPHL-TV in Philadelphia and WSFL-TV in Miami, Florida began airing the show.

== Games ==
Play2Win featured several timed word minigames. The rewards for the games were cash prizes ranging anywhere from $100 – $1,000 in cash.

The games below were the games most commonly played on the program.

Game	Instructions
Fair and Square	A simplified word search grid, with the words appearing only around the outside the grid, with the inside empty. Three or four words reflecting a single identified topic were shown, and could appear forwards, backwards and/or around corners. The contestant was obligated to identify any word for a prize.
Letter Shake	Similar to the Shuzzle, a group of letters is shown "floating" in a space onscreen. The letters, when unscrambled, form a word; however, the letters rotate in attempt to confuse the viewer.
Missing Word	A list of three compound words or phrases with either a preceding or following blank shown. The contestant must identify the words that correctly complete the blanks.
Pyramid	A pyramid of words is shown. A three-lettered word starts the utmost line and as it proceeds downward, one letter is added to the previous word to create a new word. This continues to an eight-lettered word at the base. One word would be missing from the pyramid that the contestant must identify correctly.
Shuzzle	A word jumble in which a group of scrambled letters was shown in the form a word or phrase. The contestant was obliged to unscramble and recite the correct word or phrase to win the prize.
Sure Shot	A board with 8 panels displays eight letters, each with an amount of money from $100 to $600 behind it. The host gives a category and the first letter of the items fitting the category that have been pre-chosen. If a contestant gives one of the correct answers, he/she wins the hidden amount of money behind his/her item's letter.
Word Snake	A 9 x 9 grid of letters is shown with words hidden to fit a specific category. The first letter of an answer may be highlighted and whole answers may highlight for a second or two. The contestant must identify one of the words in the puzzle.

== See also ==
- My GamesFever
- PlayMania
- quiznation
- Midnight Money Madness
- Take the Cake
