= Garda Traffic Corps =

Unit of the Irish police

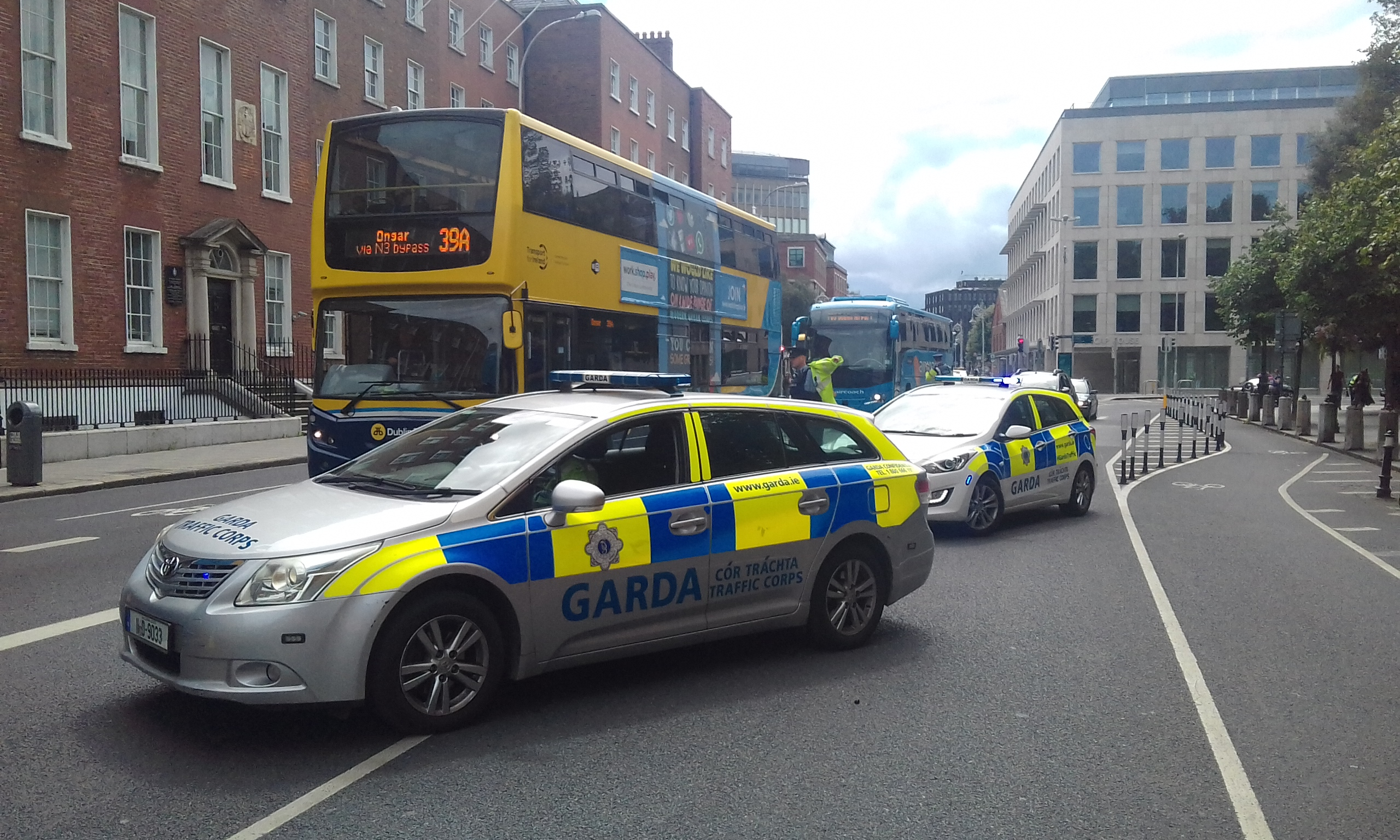
Two Garda Traffic Corps Hyundai i30 and Toyota Avensis vehicles

The Garda National Roads Policing Bureau (GNRPB) (Irish: Biúró Náisiúnta an Gharda Síochána um Póilíniú Bóithre) is the roads policing unit of the Garda Síochána. Prior to 2018, it was known as the Garda Traffic Corps (Irish: Cór Tráchta an Gharda Síochána).

== Duties and organisation ==
The main responsibility of the Garda National Roads Policing Bureau (GNRPB) is to improve road safety and reduce the incidence of fatal and serious injury on Ireland's roads.

Each Division of the Garda Síochána now has a Roads Policing Unit of its own, with an additional regional unit assigned to the Dublin Metropolitan Region.

=== Dublin Metropolitan Region ===
The Dublin Metropolitan Region Roads Policing Unit was the first dedicated traffic unit, established in 1953. It is headed by a Chief Superintendent and supported by 2 Superintendents, 2 Inspectors, 15 Sergeants, 101 Gardaí operating from a facility at Dublin Castle. This unit supports all Divisional Roads Policing Units within the Dublin Metropolitan area as well as conducting checkpoints and patrol of the entire duration of the M50 motorway.

== Programs ==
Following a review by the Traffic Corps of collisions involving fatalities, serious injury, and minor injury, the organisation compiled a list of 'Collision Prone Zones' which was published on the Garda website. These zones were subsequently subject to 'targeted enforcement of road traffic and road transport legislation'. As of 2016, these zones are subject to monitoring by the operators of speed detection vans.

== Vehicles ==
Garda Roads Policing Units use a range of vehicles, including motorcycles, marked and unmarked cars and 4x4 vehicles. Marked Roads Policing Unit vehicles are visibly different from standard Garda vehicles in that they feature the words "Roads Policing" and its Irish translation, "Póilínú Bóithre", along with full-coverage high visibility blue and yellow Battenburg markings.

=== Cars ===
One of the main Roads Policing vehicles was the Hyundai i40 Tourer, with a smaller number of Opel Insignia Estates and Hyundai i30 Tourers in service. A number of Hyundai i40 and older Ford Mondeo saloons are used as unmarked vehicles in certain units. The Hyundai Tucson is now the main vehicle used by the Garda Roads Policing Unit.

=== SUVs ===
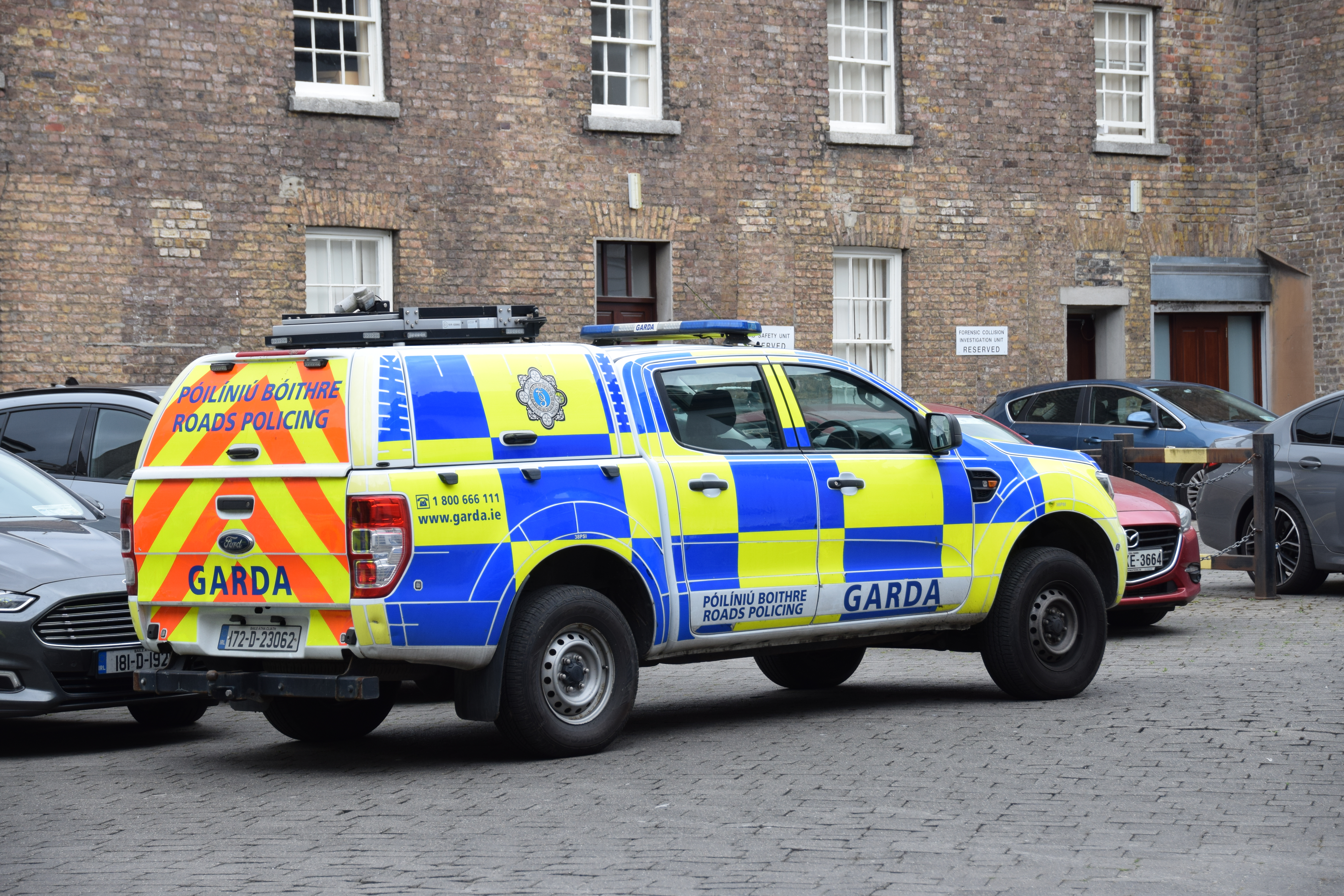
Garda Roads Policing Ford Ranger in 2024

The Mitsubishi Pajero and Ford Ranger currently serve as the unit's 4x4s, and are used for motorway patrol. The Roads Policing Unit also operates a four-door Isuzu D-Max as a motorway support vehicle.

=== Vans ===
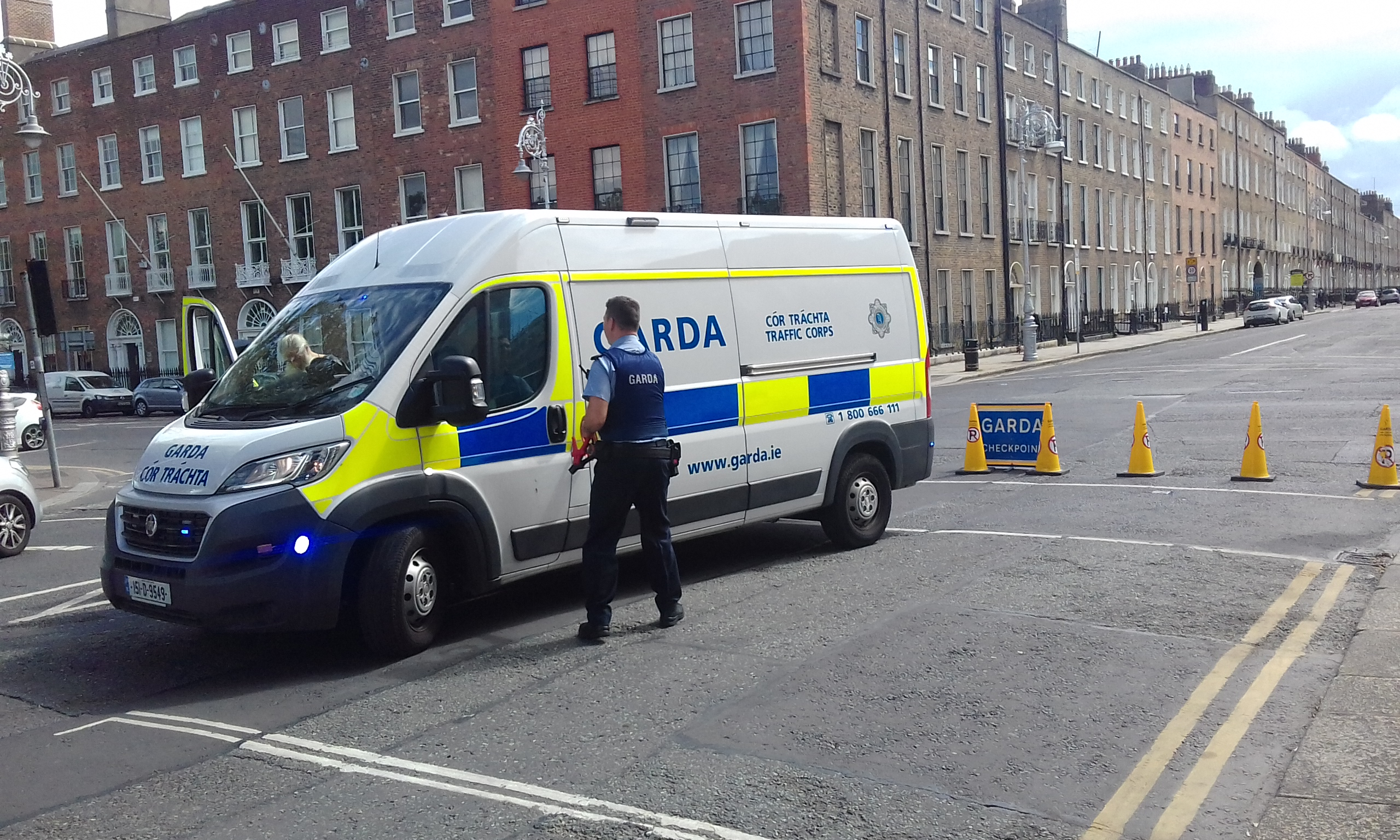
Pearse Street Divisional Traffic Corps 2015 Fiat Ducato

Pearse Street Divisional Roads Policing Unit is equipped with a Fiat Ducato van for transporting cones. The Dublin Metropolitan Region Roads Policing Unit also operates a single marked Ford Transit automatic speed limit enforcement photo radar van.

=== Motorcycles ===
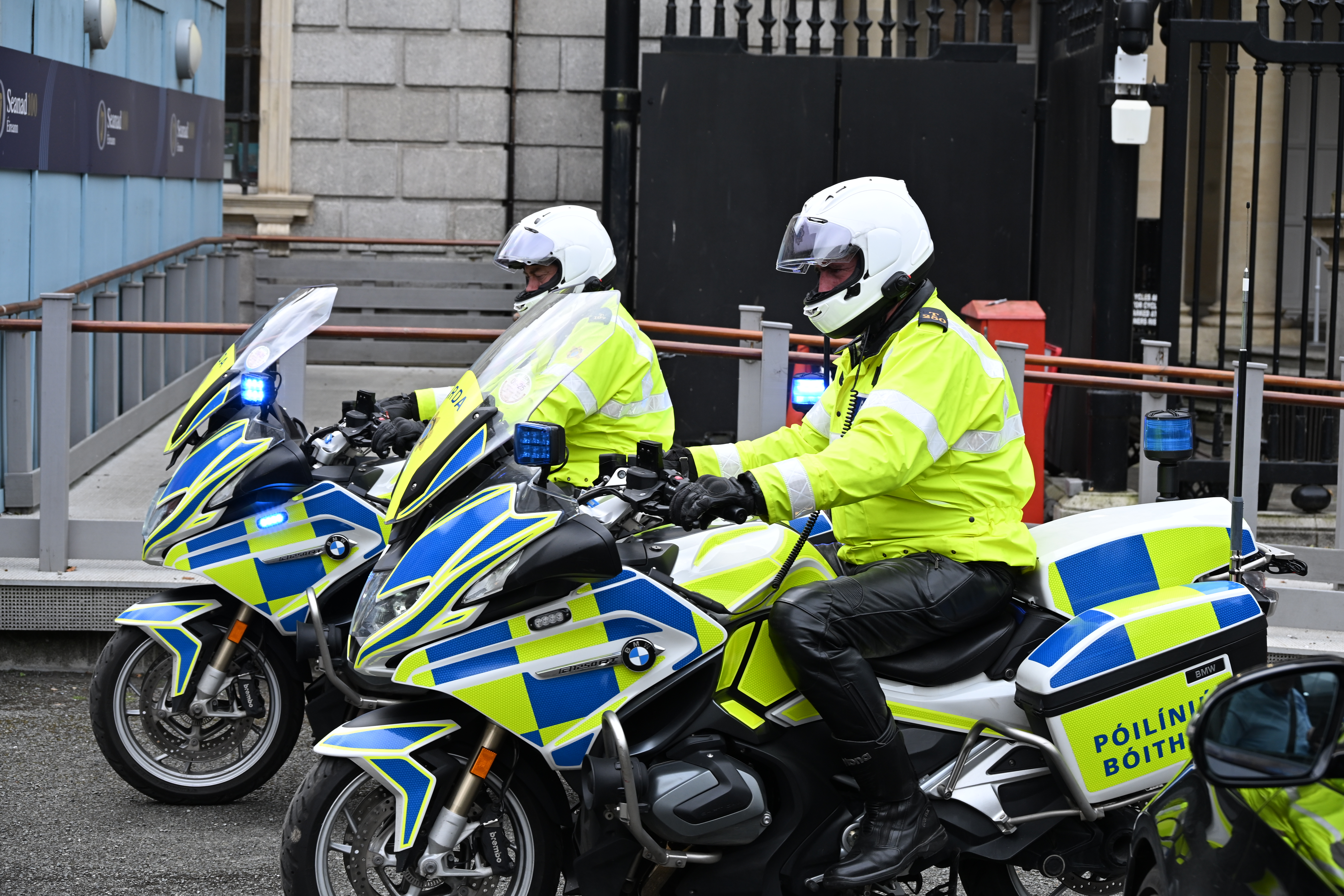
Garda Roads Policing Motorcycles outside Leinster House in 2025

Motorcycles used by the Roads Policing Unit include BMW F800 and Honda Deauville 700cc models. as the standard motorcycle. The BMW RT1200 is the current advanced motorcycle having replaced the Yamaha FJR 1300 since 2012, the purchase of the RT1250 has also begun since the RT1200 was phased out.

=== Former vehicles ===
Formerly, the Ford Mondeo served as the standard patrol vehicle, in both marked and unmarked variants, with the Isuzu Trooper and later the Toyota Land Cruiser serving as the standard 4x4 vehicles.

== Automatic Number Plate Recognition ==
Automatic number-plate recognition (ANPR) was introduced for use by the Traffic Corps in 2009, and the 'nationwide roll-out of ANPR technology [..] completed in 2010. While ANPR systems are standard on cars assigned to Roads Policing units, as of March 2017, the expansion of the use of ANPR technology was due to continue through to June 2019,

== Media ==
Traffic Blues is a documentary series broadcast on RTÉ One. It follows various traffic officers from the Garda Síochána.
