= Deal or No Deal (Irish game show) =

Irish television series

- Genre: Game show
- Based on: Deal or No Deal by John de Mol Jr.
- Presented by: Keith Barry
- Country of origin: Ireland

Production
- Producers: Endemol; TV3 Group
- Running time: 45–60 minutes (including adverts)

Original release
- Network: TV3
- Release: 13 November 2009 – 12 March 2010

Related
- Deal or No Deal

Deal or No Deal is the Irish version of the Endemol game show, which was first broadcast on TV3 in Ireland on 13 November 2009. The show is hosted by magician and entertainer Keith Barry. The show is sponsored by Ireland's National Lottery, which sells scratch cards for a chance to appear on the show.

== Format ==
The game is played using twenty-six identical sealed green boxes, each with an identifying number from 1 to 26 displayed on the front. The boxes are opened by the contestants' family members. Inside each box is a label showing a different amount of prize money between 1 cent and €250,000. All the boxes are sealed by an independent adjudicator; the value inside each box is not known to Keith Barry, the contestants, The Banker or the production team before the game. To enter the game, players must purchase a Deal or No Deal scratchcard from a National Lottery agent, and reveal a "Deal" on the "Bankers Bonus" section of the scratchcard. Each week, players are selected to appear on the show from all scratch card entries received by the National Lottery, and the draw takes place live on TV3's Ireland AM.

=== Box values ===
1¢
5¢
10¢
50¢
€1
€5
€10
€25
€50
€100
€250
€500
€750

€1,000
€2,000
€3,000
€5,000
€10,000
€15,000
€20,000
€35,000
€50,000
€75,000
€100,000
€150,000
€250,000

== Deal or No Deal Scratchcard ==
The Deal or No Deal Scratchcard is largely based on the TV game show. Entry to the main game show on TV3 is only possible by purchasing the Deal or No Deal Scratchcard from any National Lottery agent. If a player reveals the word "Deal" on the "Banker's Bonus" section of the scratchcard, they can send it to the National Lottery in the special Deal or No Deal envelopes, for a chance to appear on the show. The Deal or No Deal Scratchcard costs €3.

== Trivia ==
The Irish version is similar to the British version, with elements from the American version as well. The values are the same as the UK version, but in euros instead of pounds as well as additional amounts of 5c, €25, €2,000, and €150,000 to compensate for the fact that there are 26 boxes which are green (rather than 22 red ones).

Because there are 26 boxes, the player has to open 6 boxes before the first bank offer, then 5 boxes after saying "no deal," then 4, then 3, then 2, and then 1 at a time, until only 2 boxes are left. If the player says "no deal" to every offer, he/she then has to decide whether to keep his/her box or swap it with the one box left in play.

Like the UK version, the small amounts on the left side are labeled in blue, while the larger amounts are labeled in red. The boxes are also opened the same way, by breaking a seal off first, and then opening the box.

Similar to the UK version's "Power Five" and "Banker's Power Five" names for the highest five valued boxes and lowest five valued boxes respectively, the highest six valued boxes and lowest six valued boxes are respectively referred to as the "Super Six" and "Banker's Super Six".
