= Telemedia InteracTV =

Interactive game show production company

Telemedia InteracTV is the world's largest producer of interactive TV game shows. Telemedia produces live TV game shows in many languages. The head office is located in Budapest, Hungary. They have several studios were the TV game shows are filmed.

== History ==
Telemedia was founded by former mathematician Jeno Torocsik in 1993 as the first telemarketing service in Hungary. Initially it only provided telemarketing services for the local versions of Wheel of Fortune and Big Brother. Telemedia launched the live interactive TV game shows format in 2003.

Since 2001, the company has been continuously producing live quiz shows and has centralized its productions in its Budapest studios. As of November 2006, the sum of its live programs combined from Budapest was 60 hours a day, with more than 2,000 hours per month. At the time, the company was already testing programs for Nigeria, Kenya and Cameroon and was studying the possibility of creating programs for India and the United States, where, in the latter, regulations for call-in quiz shows were strict. Television stations that carry their programs pay nothing to carry, but share the revenues.

== TV formats ==
- Call TV
- Jewelry shows
- Charity TV
- U-star
- ESO.TV

== See also ==
- List of quiz channels
