= Traffic Blues =

- Traffic Blues logo
- Genre: Motoring, Police
- Directed by: Philip McGovern
- Narrated by: Steve Wall
- Composer: John Walsh
- Country of origin: Ireland
- Original language: English

Production
- Producers: Philip McGovern; Jane Kelly
- Running time: 30 minutes
- Production company: Big Mountain

Original release
- Network: RTÉ One
- Release: 31 May 2009 – 11 July 2011

Traffic Blues is a documentary series broadcast on RTÉ One. It followed various traffic officers from the Garda Síochána.

The first series followed the Garda Traffic Corps in a six-part series. The series was filmed over six months, putting the Dublin Metropolitan division based in Dublin Castle, the Louth division taking in stations in Drogheda and Dundalk and the Donegal division focusing on Burnfoot and Letterkenny areas in the centre of attention.

It was similar in format to the British programmes Traffic Cops or Road Wars. Six episodes were made for the series, which aired on Sundays at 20:30.

== Series two ==
A second series of Traffic Blues returned on 3 July 2011 on RTÉ One. It featured numerous traffic offences such as a speeding Audi A4 on Dublin's M50 and vehicle seizures on the Naas dual-carriageway. It also featured a drunk driver in County Cork as well as a high-speed pursuit involving a Ford Mondeo. The main differences between Series One and Series Two are a change in music used and footage from Cork and the N7 in Kildare.

== Reception ==
After the broadcast of the programme on 21 June 2009, concerns were raised when members of the force had stopped a school bus on the M4 motorway. The bus had a broken seat belt, there were unrestrained children and a worn tyre. Following the programme the National Parents Council, asked for supervisors to accompany children on buses.

== See also ==
- Garda ar Lár
