= Brain Box =

Interactive television quiz show

- Genre: Interactive quiz
- Countries of origin: Northern Ireland; Republic of Ireland; Scotland
- Original language: English

Production
- Production locations: London, UK
- Camera setup: Multi-camera
- Running time: 120–150 minutes (UTV); 30–60 minutes (STV)
- Production companies: UTV Interactive Ltd, NetPlay TV

Original release
- Network: UTV (NI and ROI), STV (Scotland), TV3 (ROI)
- Release: 3 August 2009 – 12 February 2011

Brain Box is a live, interactive quiz show, showing in Northern Ireland and the Republic of Ireland on UTV, and in Scotland on STV, airing every night, beginning after midnight.

The quiz show launched on UTV in Northern Ireland and the Republic of Ireland on Monday 3 August 2009, and on STV in Scotland just over a year later, on Thursday 19 August 2010. The show began airing on TV3 in the Republic of Ireland on 9 September 2010, just 7 months after the axing of the controversial Play TV. The channel ceased transmission of the programme just a week later, without explanation.

Brain Box is a commercial presentation, by NetPlay TV – in association with Challenge Jackpot. Although broadcast only in Scotland and Ireland, the show was actually produced at Teddington Studios in London, England (also previously used by Quiz Call).

== Reception ==
The Belfast Telegraph's Gail Walker said that "UTV's Brainbox (possibly the worst, most cynical local programme ever made) is an appallingly fascinating thing" and filled with "brushwood-rolling silent airtime" and that its only agenda was "to keep callers phoning in".

On Tuesday 8 February 2011, presenter David Johnson announced that BrainBox would end its series on 12 February 2011.
