= The Late Late Show season 49 =

Season of television series

The 49th season of The Late Late Show, the world's longest-running chat show, began on 3 September 2010 and concluded on 27 May 2011. Ryan Tubridy's second season as host, it aired on RTÉ One each Friday evening from 21:30. Viewing figures hit a 12-year high during this season.

The first guest of the season was former British prime minister Tony Blair. The live interview occurred the night before a book signing at Eason's which attracted international attention when Blair was pelted with shoes and eggs and successfully evaded an attempted citizen's arrest on charges of war crimes.

Other guests this season included Bob Geldof, Philip Nitschke, Gordon Brown, Eamon Gilmore (before he became Tánaiste), Archbishop Diarmuid Martin, Giovanni Trapattoni, Mícheál Ó Muircheartaigh, Brendan O'Carroll, Michael Parkinson, Maureen O'Hara, Rhys Ifans and Howard Marks. Golfers Graeme McDowell and Rory McIlroy were interviewed in separate episodes (in September and in March), as were Ireland football forwards Robbie Keane and Kevin Doyle (in December with wife Claudine and in April). First Irish interviews were granted by Neil Diamond and Kate and Gerry McCann. Musical guests this season included Clannad, Lighthouse Family, Villagers, Suede, Thin Lizzy, Elbow, Ronnie Wood, Republic of Loose, Bell X1, Mary Black, The Script, Tom Jones, Two Door Cinema Club and Imelda May.

The season's conclusion coincided with a tumultuous week in the history of the Irish state, with the death of former Taoiseach Dr. Garret FitzGerald occurring between the state visits of Queen Elizabeth II and Barack Obama. John Bowman and the Taoiseach Enda Kenny, were on hand to offer advice to viewers of The Late Late Show on these matters.

== Tony Blair interview ==
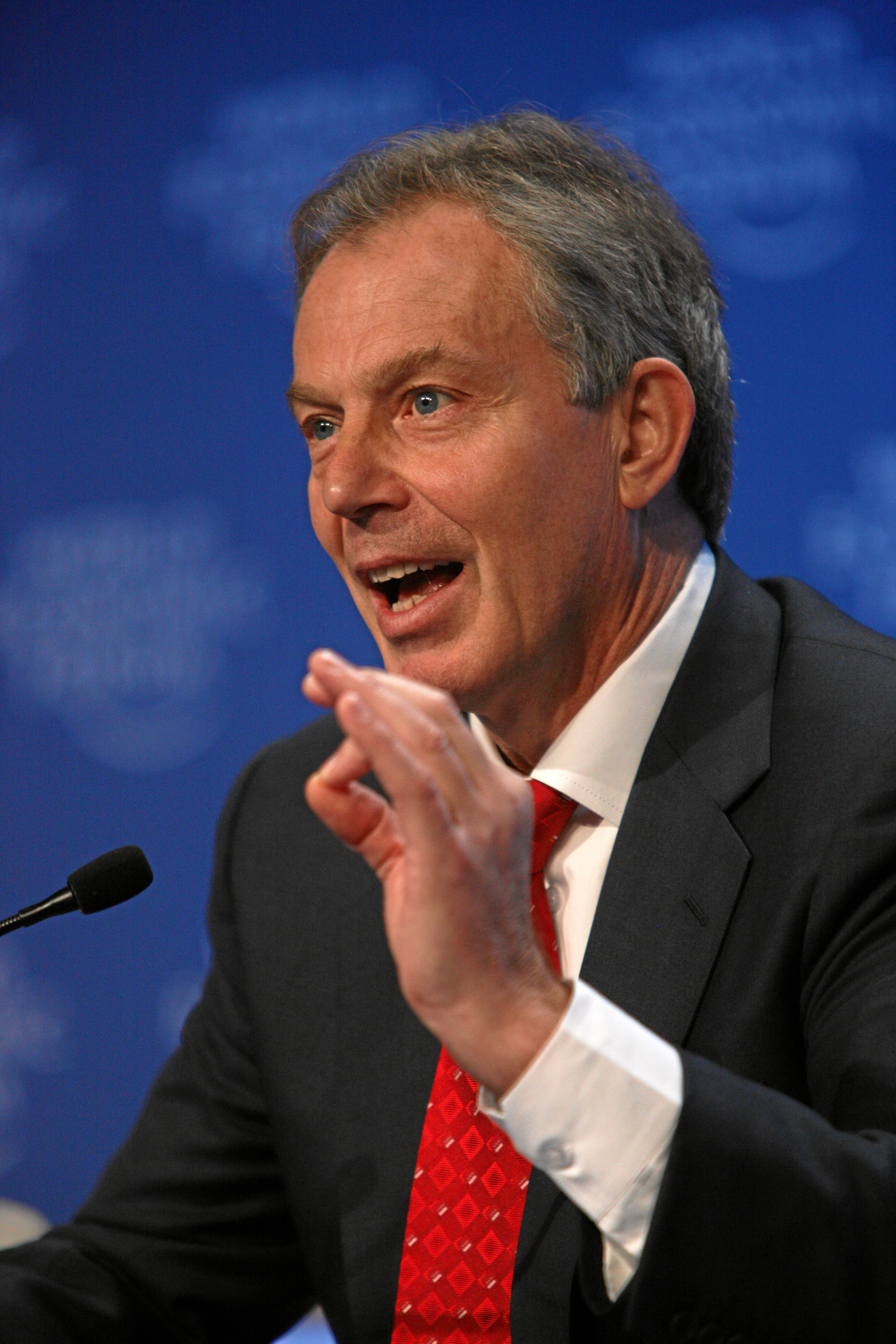
Tony Blair, who was pelted with shoes and eggs by angry civilians and subjected to an attempted citizen's arrest as he attempted to sign copies of his book A Journey after his appearance on The Late Late Show

Former British prime minister Tony Blair was the first guest of the season. It was Blair's first live television interview since the publication of his memoirs, A Journey (Pat Kenny obtained the first radio interview for Today with Pat Kenny but this was broadcast after the televised interview). Blair is believed to have taken this decision as he had hoped it would divert attention away from the more negative aspects of his foreign policy as UK prime minister, i.e. Afghanistan and Iraq. Tubridy spent an entire week studying Blair in preparation for the interview, and sought advice from Jon Snow of the UK's Channel 4 on which manner he ought to adopt in dealing with Blair. Snow vowed that anything interesting obtained during the interview would be broadcast on Channel 4 News. Blair wore a tie, though initially seemed reluctant to do so. Blair arrived to the sounds of dozens of protesters who had gathered outside the TV studio. 10 minutes were spent discussing Blair's role in the Northern Ireland peace process. Then the conversation turned to Blair's part in the wars of Afghanistan and Iraq. Tubridy asked Blair if he was a war criminal; however, Blair denied his belief in such a thing. He also denied having "blood on his hands" and looked generally quite annoyed at such questions. Blair stated his lack of desire to take decisions "based on [the wants of] those that [sic] shout most". He also stated that military action against Iran should not be ruled out. Blair was later photographed amusing himself in the company of Jedward, also guests on the same episode. Other guests that night included Donncha O'Callaghan and Imelda May.

== Second episode ==
Willie O'Dea, who resigned as Minister for Defence in some controversy, announced during his appearance on the second show of the season that he would be standing for re-election. He maintained his seat, as his party Fianna Fáil collapsed around him.

== Fifth episode ==
Rhys Ifans and Howard Marks appeared on The Late Late Show on 1 October 2010 to discuss Mr. Nice, the British independent film in which Ifans portrayed Marks. During the interview Ifans was playful with host Ryan Tubridy, at one point referring to him as a "dainty little bugger" in reference to his cross-legged manner. Netizens on boards.ie to this day refer to Tubridy as "DLB" in tribute to this incident.

The incident followed on from Ifans's playful request to buy Tubridy a drink. Tubridy said, "Uh absolutely" then tried to ask Ifans about his latest film. Ifans said, "It's called Neverland and uh, it's a prequel to Peter Pan. Yeah? OK? Are you familiar with that?" "I sure am" said Tubridy. "Because you've got very Peter Panny feet" Ifans continued. Tubridy thanked him for the compliment then Ifans smiled and said "Dainty little bugger" to laughter from the studio audience.

== Eighth episode ==
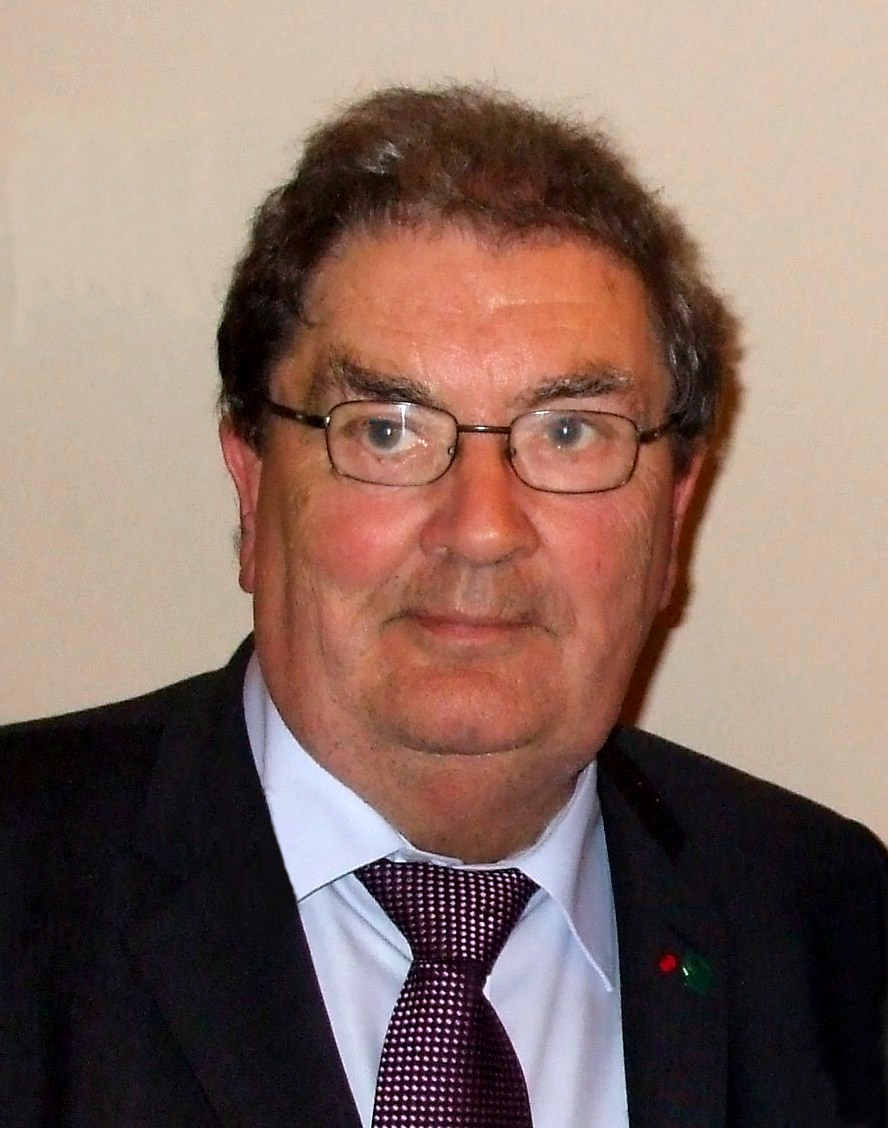
John Hume, "Ireland's Greatest" (according to a poll which concluded during the eighth episode of the season)

On the episode shown on 22 October 2010, the winner of the controversial poll was revealed to be John Hume. Historians noted the heavy emphasis on modern figures.

== Fifteenth episode ==
Former British Prime Minister Gordon Brown blamed Irish banking system regulation failures for the country's economic crisis during an interview on the show on 10 December 2010.

== Special editions ==
The season's edition of The Late Late Toy Show, broadcast on 26 November 2010, received a 72 per cent audience share and the highest number of viewers in 16 years. 90 per cent of the target audience watched the show.

The 2011 Eurosong Final was held on The Late Late Show on 11 February. Reported as one possible act in advance were Jedward. The five acts were named on 28 January 2011 as Don Mescall, Jedward, The Vard Sisters, Nikki Kavanagh and a then yet-to-be-named mystery act. The mystery act was later named as BLING. Jedward were announced as the winning act with their song "Lipstick" representing Ireland at Eurovision Song Contest 2011 in Düsseldorf.

== Episode list ==
| No. | Original release date | Guest(s) | Musical/entertainment guest(s) |
|---|---|---|---|
| 1 | 3 September 2010 | Tony Blair | Jedward |
| 2 | 10 September 2010 | The Script | The Script |
| 3 | 17 September 2010 | Mícheál Ó Muircheartaigh | N/A |
| 4 | 24 September 2010 | Tim Robbins | The Rogues Gallery Band |
| 5 | 1 October 2010 | Giovanni Trapattoni | O Emperor |
| 6 | 8 October 2010 | Una Healy and Declan Nerney | Una Healy and Declan Nerney |
| 7 | 15 October 2010 | Hector Ó hEochagáin | Singin' Bernie Walsh |
| 8 | 22 October 2010 | Nigella Lawson | Ronnie Wood |
| 9 | 29 October 2010 | Tom Jones | Tom Jones |
| 10 | 5 November 2010 | Michael Parkinson | N/A |
| 11 | 12 November 2010 | Dawn French | Two Door Cinema Club |
| 12 | 19 November 2010 | Dara Ó Briain | Shayne Ward |
| 13 | 26 November 2010 | Various children | McFly, Joe McElderry, The Strypes |
The Late Late Toy Show; television debut of The Strypes
| 14 | 3 December 2010 | Jack Black | Westlife |
| 15 | 10 December 2010 | Take That | Robbie Williams |
| 16 | 17 December 2010 | Mary Byrne | The Rubberbandits |
| 17 | 24 December 2010 | Robbie and Claudine Keane | Jimmy MacCarthy |
| 18 | 7 January 2011 | Brian Dennehy | Julian Lloyd Webber |
| 19 | 14 January 2011 | Kathryn Thomas and the five Operation Transformation leaders | The Coronas |
| 20 | 21 January 2011 | Discussion on the week's political upheaval that would later lead to the collapse of the government) | Clannad |
| 21 | 28 January 2011 | Bob Geldof | Bob Geldof |
| 22 | 4 February 2011 | Maura Tierney and Ardal O'Hanlon | Mary Coughlan |
| 23 | 11 February 2011 | N/A | Five musical acts |
Eurosong special
| 24 | 18 February 2011 | Thelma Madine | Ellie Goulding |
| 25 | 25 February 2011 | Maureen O'Hara | Wonderland |
| 26 | 4 March 2011 | Cast of The Commitments | Elbow |
| 27 | 11 March 2011 | Phil Lynott (in the year of her son's 25th anniversary) | Thin Lizzy |
| 28 | 18 March 2011 | Rory McIlroy | The JD Set |
| 29 | 25 March 2011 | Ireland cricket team | Buddy Greco |
| 30 | 1 April 2011 | Eamonn Holmes and wife Ruth Langsford | Villagers |
| 31 | 8 April 2011 | Charlie Bird | Jessie J |
| 32 | 15 April 2011 | Kevin Doyle, Sheamus | Josh Groban |
| 33 | 22 April 2011 | John Healy (The Restaurant) | Adrian Edmondson |
| 34 | 29 April 2011 | Jedward | Suede |
| 35 | 6 May 2011 | Seán Gallagher (on why he wants to run for President), Keith and Lisa Duffy (on their work with Irish Autism Action) | Crystal Swing |
| 36 | 13 May 2011 | Christian Louboutin | Mary Black |
| 37 | 20 May 2011 | John Bowman (on the life of Dr. Garret FitzGerald) | Andrea Corr |
| 38 | 27 May 2011 | Taoiseach Enda Kenny (on the visits of Queen Elizabeth II and Barack Obama) | Il Divo and Bell X1 with the RTÉ Concert Orchestra |
Neil Diamond's first ever Irish interview
