= Erin C. Myers Madeira =

American sailor (born 1977)

Erin C. Myers Madeira is the former captain of the sailing vessel Makulu II and led a 3-year educational expedition and global circumnavigation. She currently works with The Nature Conservancy supporting collaborations between the conservation sector and Indigenous Peoples. She is a former editor for Blue Water Sailing magazine, contributor to Soundings magazine, U.S. Fulbright Fellow., and Program Fellow at Resources for the Future. She is a graduate of the Bren School of Environmental Science & Management at the University of California, Santa Barbara and Dartmouth College.

== Sailing career ==
Erin learned to sail in a 12' bullseye sailboat during summers in Southwest Harbor, Maine, on Mount Desert Island. She worked on a commercial schooner, the Rachel B. Jackson, and later on the sail training vessels SSV Westward, SSV Corwith Cramer, and SSV Tole Mour. Erin raced competitively at Dartmouth College, earning recognition as an Inter-Collegiate Sailing Association All-American for three years in a row and part of the team winning the ICSA Women's Dinghy Championship in 2000.

== Circumnavigation ==
In 2001, she joined Heather Halstead at the educational non-profit Reach the World, which produces online educational materials based on real-world expeditions. As Captain and Expedition Leader, Erin led the 2001-2004 Voyage of Makulu, the flagship activity of Reach the World. The expedition members researched environmental science, geography, and livelihood topics and created curricular content for partner classrooms in the United States. The voyage began and ended in New York city and followed the standard antipodal circumnavigation route going westwards, visiting such areas as the Caribbean Islands, the Panama Canal, the Galapagos Islands, Polynesia, Australia, Southeast Asia, Sri Lanka, the Gulf of Aden, the Red Sea, the Suez Canal, the Mediterranean Sea, Morocco, West Africa, the Cape Verde Islands, and Bermuda.
