= Play TV (game show) =

- Presented by: Derval Mellett; Fiona Mulhall; Lauren Bannon; JG Murphy; Aoife Baker
- Country of origin: Ireland
- No. of episodes: 160

Production
- Running time: 3 hours
- Production company: Telemedia InteracTV

Original release
- Network: TV3 (Ireland)
- Release: 25 May 2009 – 6 March 2010

Related
- Psychic Readings Live

Play TV is an Irish late-night/early-morning phone-in quiz show produced by Telemedia InteracTV and broadcast by TV3 from May 2009 to March 2010. The show was broadcast live every night of the week, Monday to Sunday, from 12:00am to 3:00am from InteracTV's headquarters in Budapest, Hungary. The program was very controversial, with numerous complaints against it made to the Broadcasting Authority of Ireland.

TV3, however, justified it by saying that they got money from PlayTV, which saved jobs from being lost during the recession. Two years after TV3 removed Play TV from its schedules, it began to air Psychic Readings Live in the same slot. Newspaper reports compared the controversy generated by Psychic Readings Live to Play TV, with one saying "it will remind TV3 of a past life".

== Calling the show ==
While the show was on air, viewers were encouraged to call a premium rate number in order to give solutions to puzzles being put to them by the presenters. However, there was no guarantee that callers would get through to the studio, although they were still charged the full cost of the call.

According to TV3, there was a limit of 50 calls per night or 300 calls per month that could be made by any one person. However the accuracy of this statement seems to be in some doubt, as one person has claimed to have made 170 calls in one night at a cost of €370.

However, according to "terms and conditions" on the playtv website, "The daily limit is 40 calls."

== Games ==
The games ranged from spot the difference, to making a word out of jumbled up letters, to guessing words when given a clue. The word guessing game required viewers to identify an obscure object based on its color, or where it might be found.

== Presenters ==
The program had a number of presenters over its run. The original presenters were J(ohn) G(erard) Murphy (who left in November 2009), Derval Mellett (who left in August 2009, but returned when J G Murphy departed) and Fiona Mulhall. Mulhall, who had previously hosted IWW Wrestling as "Fiona Fox", presented the last show on the night of Friday, 5 March 2010. Presenters who joined during the show's run were Lauren Bannon, who worked on the programme from July 2009 to January 2010 and Aoife Baker who became a presenter in January 2010.

== Controversy ==
On 21 September 2009, callers to Joe Duffy's Liveline complained about the phone charges and methods surrounding TV3's late night quiz show Play TV. Joe Duffy had users of the Play TV service discussing the problems with this type of show. Joe stated that many of his listeners and callers to the show had not got a satisfactory reply from TV3 in relation to their complaints and hence his reason for this section of his show, TV3 were unwilling to be a part of the discussion show having been asked by RTÉ Radio. According to Joe Duffy the Regulator is not interested in this television show and is of the view that it is quite legitimate. Some of the contestants had not been paid their prize money. One caller explains Play TV to Joe Duffy: -

I was watching it one night for ten minutes or so and I had had enough of that so I decided to flick around and I came back about half an hour later the presenters was still at the same puzzle, they had 2 or 3 pictures and you have to pick out 3 things that were different, I spent some time figuring it out but it was simple enough and I thought surely somebody has seen those differences and she was giving more and more time for people to ring in, so I rang up. I got through to some lady who asked me some simple question to which I knew the answer. I was surprised to be asked another question because there was no forewarning of that but I knew the answer as it happened and then she said "Sorry try again you are not getting through" and that was it. So I was talking to a friend and she told me that I should ring the regulator called the Broadcasting Complaints Commission (BCC) they stated that they weren't the right people and pass my email on to another regulator I have not got a reply. It didn't cost much but if they are getting numerous calls in each night that amounts to a huge take for them and I feel it is a rip off. I am surprised that any TV station would be operating like this and would be allowing it to go on.

TV3 advised viewers who played the game to go to RegTel the self-regulatory body of premium rate phone number in Ireland with any complaints. RegTel only require the phone company to advise users that they have reached their €60 limit they do not require that they prevent players from continuing to play.

In response to the negative reaction from audiences to Play TV David McRedmond (CEO, TV3) was indignant about the show stating: -

Look, we've been through the toughest recession, with revenues plummeting to minus 20% to 25%. We've had two rounds of redundancies and all taken pay cuts, and we're doing our best to survive. And then we do something like Play TV and there's been all sorts of complaints.

David McRedmond stated that the show gets 12,000 viewers on some nights and that if people think it is "low-rent" they don't have to watch it. He feels that the Joe Duffy show was unfair to TV3 and stated that RTÉ radio show had two days of complaints and yet spoke nothing about the TV3 documentary The Forgotten Irish (which had been partly funded by the licence fee).

=== Complaints to the BAI ===
On 25 September 2009 the Broadcasting Authority of Ireland met to review 20 complaints made to it by individuals in relation to Play TV. Of the 20 15 were upheld, 1 was rejected, 1 was determined to be invalid and 2 remained under investigation.

TV3's full response to each of the complaints were as follows: -

1.Play TV as a program has been notified to all appropriate authorities and received all appropriate consents (including that of the Premium Rate Service Regulator – RegTel).
2.The program is run in accordance with all appropriate Codes of Practice and Regulatory Consents.
3.All appropriate terms and conditions are on display.
4.The Presenter of the service also informs viewers of the pricing which is clearly on a per call basis. The fact that not all calls get through to the studio is also made clear.
5.Full terms and conditions, help lines and other information are available via a non-premium rate number which is displayed on the screen and further, are available at www.playtvireland.com.
6.We would further make the point that the website makes it clear as to the winners are each night. TV3 can confirm that as of mid July, over 330 had won prizes of up to several thousand euros each. Full details are available on the website.
7.Given the nature of the prizes (up to several thousand euro per competition) and the nationwide distribution of the program TV3 would state that it is not reasonable to expect that if you simply know the answer to the question and ring in with it that you would win the prize.
8.The principle behind this service is exactly the same principle as behind that run on all other broadcasters in Ireland which use Premium Rate numbers to enter a competition. It is universal practice that a winner is then selected from the number of individuals who will have got the correct answer. This is a particularly prevalent form of competition mechanic when prizes such as cars, holidays etc., are given away on programs such as The Late Late Show, etc.
9. The service clearly states there is a charge per call. Given the time of the program, the service is clearly aimed at an adult audience. It must be stressed that an individual can only incur charges if they ring the service. There is no subscription element or other charge or mechanisms. The fee is payable only upon calls made.

In upholding the 15 complaints the BAI stated "that these broadcasts were in breach of the General Advertising Code and in particular sections 6.1, 3.1, 3.1.3 and 3.1.4."

6.1 The general principles and rules applying to all commercial communications and, where relevant, the general rules pertaining to advertising shall apply to teleshopping.
3.1 All commercial communications shall be prepared with a sense of responsibility both to the individual and to society and shall not prejudice the interests of either. All commercial communications shall be legal, honest, decent and truthful.
3.1.3 Commercial communications shall not contain inaccurate or misleading claims, statements, illustrations or representations, either direct or implied.
3.1.4 Commercial communications shall not omit relevant information in a manner that, in the result, is misleading or is likely to mislead. This means that all pertinent details of an offer shall be stated in a clear and understandable manner.

The BAI went on to say that it did not agree with the manner in which each complaint was replied to – a standard manner that did not take into account each individual complaint. As for other TV shows that provide prizes it stated; that the winner was selected at random sometime in the future, were a closing date/time was specifically given, this is not the case on PlayTV.

On viewing one of the spot the difference tapes the Authority thought it unlikely that no one during the whole game was able to get through to the presenter until the last minute of the game and that it the presenter continued to suggest that no one was calling because – as far as the presenter was concerned – the "easy" spot the difference was very difficult.

In January 2010 the compliance committee of the Broadcasting Authority of Ireland up held 10 more complains against TV3 and their broadcast of Play TV. However, as requested, in 2009, TV3 gave individual replies to each complaint rather than a standard reply as give with the previous complaints. Three other complaints about Play TV were rejected by the BAI.

In their judgement the compliance committee found that Play TV's practices were "misleading and unfair". In one example they found that one of the questions on the show asked, which eyes are Brad Pitt's, in all 12 eyes were shown on screen and one after another contests rang in until the final caller had eliminated each of the other 11 eyes only to find that the final pair of eyes were not the correct answer, as it turned out several sets of eyes were the answer to the question.

In February 2010 the compliance committee of the Broadcasting Authority of Ireland up held 3 more complains against TV3 and their broadcast of Play TV. In March 2010 the BAI upheld six more complaints, but rejected one complaint.

== Cancellation ==
On 5 March 2010 TV3 announced that the Play TV contract was terminated with immediate effect. Its last airing was from 00:15 to 03:15 on Saturday Morning 6 March 2010. TV3 noted the professionalism of Telemedia. TV3 also took time to note that it did not receive licence fee revenue, it has 30% of its schedule dedicated to Irish programming, their redundancies during 2009, the economy and the help of PlayTV in providing some money to continue their list of Irish shows. They also noted how News at 5.30, Tonight with Vincent Browne and The Apprentice had won an award at the annual IFTA awards. In their statement they put the removal of the program purely to audience figures. TV3 did not apologize for their conduct. The cancellation of Play TV was welcomed by the Minister for Communications, Energy and Natural Resources, Eamon Ryan.

On 9 September 2010, TV3 started broadcasting a similar format show called Brain Box. This ceased without explanation a week later.

At the launch of TV3's Autumn (18 August 2010) schedule David McRedmond (CEO TV3) was interviewed by The Irish Times where he admitted mistakes had been made and thatPlay TV was axed not just due to falling audience figures but also to the bad press and the regulator's constant scrutiny of the show. He still refused to apologize to viewers on behalf of TV3 again stating that "It was an essential part of getting us through the recession" regardless of what the BAI called a "misleading and unfair" program.

== Play TV in Canada ==
A version of Play TV by the same producers was broadcast since 2009 on Global in Canada; as with the Irish version, the program was produced in Budapest, featuring Canadian personalities, with similar game play, and generally broadcast during late-night hours. For the Canadian version, viewers pay $2 (plus taxes) per call or per mobile text for a chance to give their answer on air.

During the period that this program was on Global, viewers registered complaints to the network and the Canadian Broadcast Standards Council (CBSC), over accusations over the ambiguity of some of the questions presented, as well as the refusal to explain the answers to the questions, citing that a question of a similar type would be used in a later broadcast. The Global broadcast originally ended 26 March 2010; however, since that date, it had since broadcast on Telelatino, and resurfaced on Global as of May 2011.

On 1 April 2010, the CBSC admonished Global station CIII-TV in Toronto for its role in the broadcasts.
