= Golica TV =

Slovenian local TV station

GOLICA TV
- Country: Slovenija

Ownership
- Sister channels: TV Petelin Čarli TV

History
- Launched: 1995

Links
- Website: https://www.golica.si

Golica TV is a Slovenian local television station. Golica is one of the leading folk music stations in the Slovenian broadcasting market. The station offers a large compilation of folk music videos, entertainment live shows, live broadcasts and shopping network. It started in 1995.

== TV shows ==
- Gospodinje pojejo (Housewives sing)
- Z Golico na vas (With Golica to the countryside)
- Jutro z Pečom in Rezo (Morning with Pečo and Reza)
- Opoldne z Mino Pal (At noon with Mina Pal)
- Popoldne z Jasmino (Afternoon with Jasmina)
- Vikend z Mojco (Weekend with Mojca)
- Golica v zivo (Golica live)
- Odpelji Škodo (Take Škoda)

== TV shows of the past ==
- Pod židano marelo
- Golica Naj naj
- Glasbeni kviz (Music quiz)
- Vislice (Gallows)
- Iz domače skrinje (From our chests)

== TV hosts ==
- Špela Grošelj
- Mama Manka
- Katarina Jurkovič
- Karmen Klinc
- Maja Oderlap
- Jasmina Kandorfer Čekeliš
- Žiga Kršinar
- Domen Hren
- Robert Pečnik - Pečo
- Alenka Oldroyd - Reza
- Mina Pal
