= Take the Cake =

- Starring: Joe Clair; Toccara; Gary Anthony Sturgis (substitute)
- Country of origin: United States
- No. of episodes: 85

Production
- Running time: 60 minutes (inc. commercials)

Original release
- Network: BET
- Release: July 9 – November 2, 2007

Take the Cake is a live, interactive game show on BET. The one-hour program featured interactive games where the viewers could win cash prizes. The show aired from 12 midnight to 1 a.m. Eastern every Monday night through Friday night. The program was produced by Endemol, who produced Midnight Money Madness for TBS in 2006.

The show aired its finale on November 2, airing a total of 85 live shows.

== Rules ==
The contestants on Take the Cake were home viewers. United States residents 18 or older could have entered the program by text messaging a request or using the network's website. BET charged a fee for each text message entry, in addition to standard text messaging rates charged by the wireless provider. Entries on the website were free. Regardless of the method of entry, each entry had an equal chance of being selected. An entry did not necessarily guarantee an opportunity to appear on the show. Residents of certain states may have been ineligible to play various entry methods.

== Games ==
Take the Cake featured various minigames that were played throughout the program. The rewards for the games were usually cash prizes ranging from $100 to $2,000 in cash.

To speed up the games at certain points, various methods were employed:

- Hints given by the hosts to viewers.
- A "speed round" where more calls are accepted than normal.
- The host increasing the prize amount as an incentive.
- A timer will start to represent how long the game will remain and a new one will begin.

These games were featured on Take the Cake.

Game	Instructions
A-List	An "A-List" celebrity is shown, along with the first letter of the title of a movie he/she starred in. The caller must identify what movie was pre-chosen.
All Mixed Up	Similar to an anagram, a word, name or phrase with the letters mixed up is given. The contestant has to identify what the unscrambled words are.
Baby Momma Drama/Boo'd Up	One of the hosts will have their photo mixed with another celebrity, or a famous couple will have their images mixed, creating an odd picture. The caller must identify who the celebrity/couple is.
Black Don't Crack	A digitally-aged photograph of a black celebrity is shown. The caller must identify who that celebrity is.
Body Double	The host's face is superimposed over the face of a celebrity with the body still visible. The caller must identify who the celebrity is.
Caketown Scoop	A celebrity gossip story will be discussed, along with a pixelated photo and a hinting headline of the celebrity subject. The caller must identify who the celebrity is.
Cast Away	A photo of a television show's cast is shown, with each cast member being revealed in 20-second intervals. The caller must identify what the program is.
Clued Up	Similar to a crossword puzzle, this features a number of horizontal words with one letter in each word replaced with a question mark. Vertically, the letters behind the question marks make the name of a popular celebrity. The contestant must identify the hidden name.
Hot Moves	A popular hip hop dance is demonstrated. The caller must identify, from three choices, which dance is being performed.
Murder on Wax	A parody of a real rap song is performed by comedian Kel Mitchell. The caller must identify what the song being lauded is.
Say What You See	Three images are placed side-by-side. When the content of these images is said aloud, they formulate the name of a celebrity, movie or television program. The caller must identify the name.
Snake Word	A 3x3 of grid of letters is present. The contestant must make "snake" the letters in order to form the name of a celebrity.
Strip Tease	A picture of a celebrity is hidden behind 25 squares in a 5x5 grid. As the squares begin to disappear, the caller must identify the celebrity.
Twisted	A picture of a celebrity is morphed into various forms. The contestant must identify the celebrity.
Vowel Movement	The name of a celebrity is shown, with all of the consonants removed. The caller must identify who the celebrity is.
What the Blank?/Shooting Blanks	A word that may begin many words or phrases is given. Callers gave the answer that they thought would fill the blank. If he/she picked one of the pre-chosen answers, he/she won its designated value.
Who Am I?	Someone performs an impersonation of a celebrity. The caller must identify who the celebrity is.
Word Up	Sixteen letters are given. A contestant must make a smaller word using any of those letters. Choosing one of the pre‑determined words will win a prize.

These games were featured in separate segments outside of the normal rotation.

Game	Instructions
The Big Spin	Some nights, at the end of the program, a trivia question is given. The contestant has to answer that question correctly. If he/she does, one of the hosts spins a wheel with nineteen spaces containing values of $100, $150, $200, $300, $400 and $500 while the other simultaneously spins an eight‑spaced wheel with values of "single", "double" and "triple". The money value and multiplication the flipper of the wheel landed on is awarded to the contestant. The wheel may also be used to determine cash prizes during regular play, as well.
Jackpot	Occasionally, winners of normal games in the show are given a chance to play a special game for a designated large jackpot. There are two variations on the Jackpot game: Guess the Celebrity: Ten clues are hidden on a board, each with a riddle‑style clue describing a celebrity. The caller picks one of the hints to reveal and may use that clue along with any other previously revealed information to identify the celebrity. Memory: Names of celebrities are hidden behind ten panels on the board, three of which are identical. The hosts will identify which name is hidden three times. In order to win the jackpot, the caller must identify the three panels, in secession, the name is hidden behind. The Jackpot starts at a $1,000 base. For each unsuccessful attempt, the jackpot will raise $100 per clue or in the Memory game, per episode. If guessed correctly, a new Jackpot game is started on the next episode.

== Other features ==
During the regular program, celebrities often appeared to help as performers during the game or to help with clues in the games.

The show also featured chances to win when it was not airing. During the daily programming, "Daily Game" questions aired in which viewers could have won cash. The entry methods and regulations were the same as the regular Take the Cake program. This feature ended October 5.

== See also ==
- List of quiz channels
- PlayMania
- Midnight Money Madness
