= History of communication =

The history of communication technologies (media and appropriate inscription tools) have evolved in tandem with shifts in political and economic systems, and by extension, systems of power. Communication can range from very subtle processes of exchange to full conversations and mass communication. The history of communication itself can be traced back since the origin of speech circa 100,000 BCE. The use of technology in communication may be considered since back to the first use of symbols about 30,000 years BCE. Among the symbols used, there are cave paintings, petroglyphs, pictograms and ideograms. Writing was a major innovation, as well as printing technology and, more recently, telecommunications and the Internet.

== Prehistory ==
Human communication was initiated with the origin of speech approximately 100,000 years BCE. The earliest communicative symbols were developed about 30,000 years ago. The imperfection of speech allowed easier dissemination of ideas and eventually resulted in the creation of new forms of communication, improving both the range at which people could communicate and the longevity of the information.

The oldest known symbols created for communication were cave paintings, a form of rock art, dating to the Upper Paleolithic age. The oldest known cave painting is located within Chauvet Cave, dated to around 30,000 BCE. These paintings contained increasing amounts of information: people may have created the first calendar as far back as 15,000 years ago. The connection between drawing and writing is further shown by linguistics: in Ancient Egypt and Ancient Greece the concepts and words of drawing and writing were the same (Egyptian: 's-sh', Greek: 'graphein').

== Storytelling ==
Verbal communication is one of the earliest forms of human communication, the oral tradition of storytelling has dated back to various times in history. The development of communication in its oral form can be based on certain historical periods. Oral history is the method of collecting and preserving primary source testimonies from individuals and groups who lived through those time periods. The complexity of oral communication has always been reflective based on the circumstance of the time period. Verbal communication was never bound to one specific area, instead, it had and continues to be a globally shared tradition of communication. People communicated through song, poems, and chants, as some examples. People would gather in groups and pass down stories, myths, and history. Oral poets from Indo-European regions were known as "weavers of words" for their mastery over the spoken word and ability to tell stories. Nomadic people also had oral traditions that they used to tell stories of the history of their people to pass them on to the next generation.

Semi-nomadic Arabian tribes, such as the Bedouin, carried a rich oral tradition. Due to the nature of a nomadic lifestyle, little material evidence of these early nomads was left behind, their oral history however was readily disseminated across space and time. The richness of the nomadic life and culture is preserved by early Muslim scholars who collect the poems and stories that are handed down from generation to generation. Poems created by these Arabic nomads are passed down by specialists known as sha'ir. These individuals spread the stories and histories of these nomadic tribes, and often in times of war, would strengthen morale within members of given tribes through these stories. Another example of this ascetic nomadic lifestyle were the Waldensians, who passed along the word of the Christian God to anyone who would listen.

== Petroglyphs ==
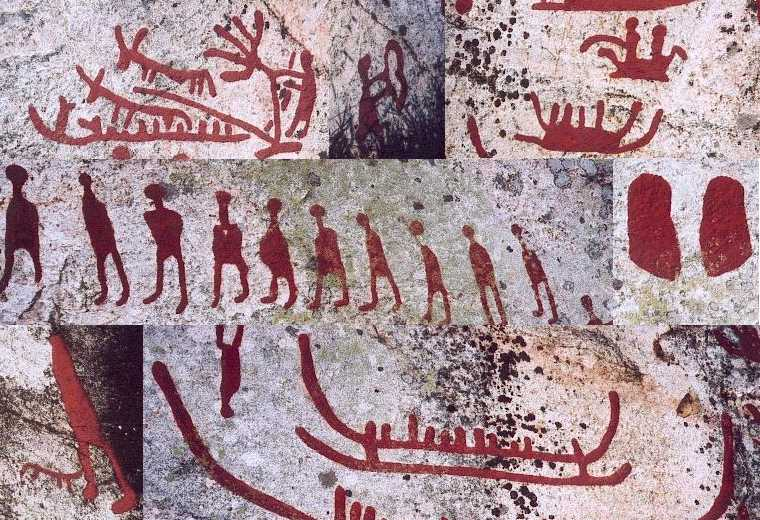
Petroglyphs from Häljesta (sv), Sweden. Nordic Bronze Age

The next advancement in the history of communications came with the production of petroglyphs, carvings into a rock surface. It took about 20,000 years for Homo sapiens to move from the first cave paintings to the first petroglyphs, dated to approximately the Neolithic and late Upper Paleolithic boundary, about 10,000 to 12,000 years ago. The petroglyphs of the Hawaiian islands were associated with several kinds of symbolism, myths, legends, and art.

It is possible that Homo sapiens (humans) of that time used some other forms of communication, often for mnemonic purposes - specially arranged stones, symbols carved in wood or earth, quipu-like rocks, tattoos, but little other than the most durable carved stones has survived to modern times and we can only speculate about their existence based on our observation of still existing 'hunter-gatherer' cultures such as those of Africa or Oceania.

== Pictograms ==
A pictogram (pictograph) is a symbol representing a concept, object, activity, place or event by illustration. Pictography is a form of proto-writing whereby ideas are transmitted through drawing. Pictographs were the next step in the evolution of communication: the most important difference between petroglyphs and pictograms is that petroglyphs are simply showing an event, but pictograms are telling a story about the event, thus they can for example be ordered chronologically.

Pictograms were used by various ancient cultures all over the world since around 9000 BCE, when tokens marked with simple pictures began to be used to label basic farm produce and become increasingly popular around 6000–5000 BCE. Another example of this is how the people of the Netherlands used pictograms to portray what was going on at the time.

They were the basis of cuneiform and hieroglyphs and began to develop into logographic writing systems around 5000 BCE.

== Ideograms ==
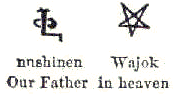
The beginning of the Lord's Prayer in Míkmaq hieroglyphic writing. The text reads Nujjinen wásóq – "Our father / in heaven".

Pictograms, in turn, evolved into ideograms, graphical symbols that represent an idea. Their ancestors, the pictograms, could represent only something resembling their form: therefore a pictogram of a circle could represent a sun, but not concepts like 'heat', 'light', 'day' or 'Great God of the Sun'. Ideograms, on the other hand, could convey more abstract concepts.

Because some ideas are universal, many different cultures developed similar ideograms. For example, an eye with a tear means 'sadness' in Native American ideograms in California, as it does for the Aztecs, the early Chinese and the Egyptians.

Ideograms were precursors of logographic writing systems.

== Writing ==
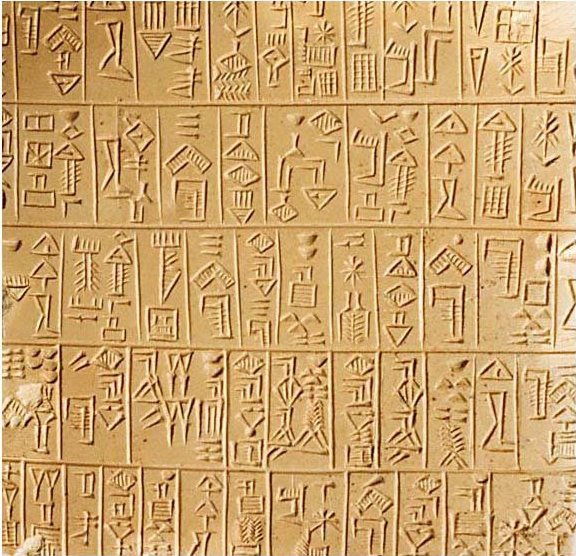
26th century BC Sumerian cuneiform script in Sumerian language, listing gifts to the high priestess of Adab on the occasion of her election. One of the earliest examples of human writing.

=== Early scripts ===
The oldest-known forms of writing were primarily logographic in nature, based on pictographic and ideographic elements. Most writing systems can be broadly divided into three categories: logographic, syllabic and alphabetic (or segmental); however, all three may be found in any given writing system in varying proportions, often making it difficult to categorize a system uniquely.

The invention of the first writing systems is roughly contemporary with the beginning of the Bronze Age in the late Neolithic of the late 5th millennium BCE. The first writing system is generally believed to have been invented in prehistoric Sumer and developed by the late 4th millennium BCE into cuneiform. Egyptian hieroglyphs, and the undeciphered Proto-Elamite writing system and Indus Valley script, also date to this era, though a few scholars have questioned the Indus Valley script's status as a writing system.

By the end of the 4th millennium BCE, this had evolved into a method of keeping accounts, using a round shaped stylus impressed into soft clay at different angles for recording numbers. This was gradually augmented with pictographic writing using a sharp stylus to indicate what was being counted. Round-stylus and sharp-stylus writing was gradually replaced about 2700–2000 BC by writing using a wedge-shaped stylus (hence the term cuneiform), at first only for logograms, but developed to include phonetic elements by 2800 BCE. About 2600 BCE cuneiform began to represent syllables of spoken Sumerian language.

Finally, cuneiform writing became general-purpose writing system for logograms, syllables, and numbers. By the 26th century; BCE, this script had been adapted to another Mesopotamian language, Akkadian, and from that to others such as Hurrian, and Hittite. Scripts similar in appearance to this writing system include those for Ugaritic and Old Persian.

The Chinese script may have originated independently of the Middle Eastern scripts, around the 16th century BCE (early Shang dynasty), out of a late neolithic Chinese system of proto-writing dating back to c. 6000 BCE. The inspiration of Chinese script originally came from bird and animal tracks and how they are so distinct. The pre-Columbian writing systems of the Americas, including Olmec and Mayan, are also generally believed to have had independent origins.

=== Alphabet ===
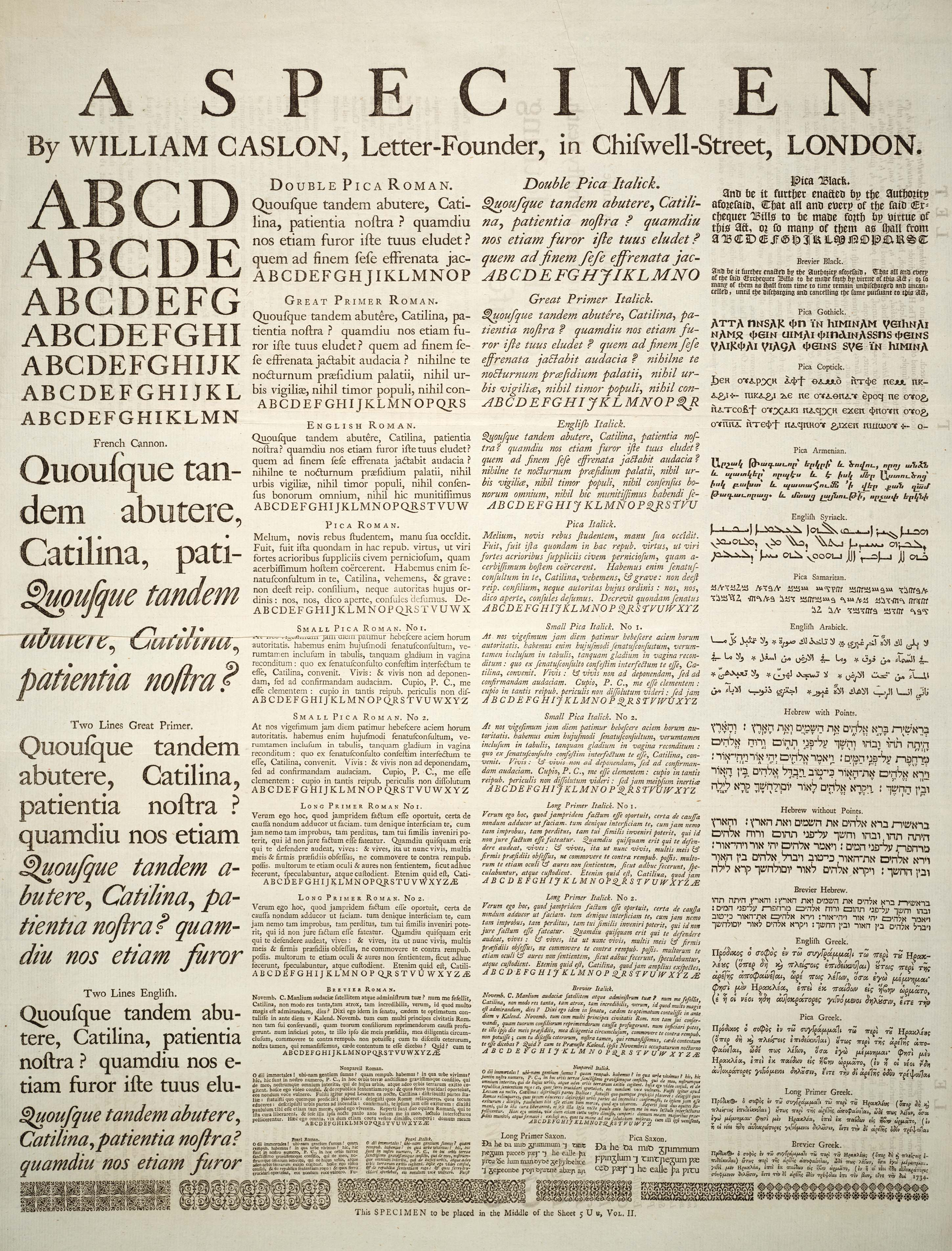
A Specimen of typeset fonts and languages, by William Caslon, letter founder; from the 1728 Cyclopaedia.

The first pure alphabets (properly, "abjads", mapping single symbols to single phonemes, but not necessarily each phoneme to a symbol) emerged around 2000 BCE in Ancient Egypt, but by then alphabetic principles had already been incorporated into Egyptian hieroglyphs for a millennium (see Middle Bronze Age alphabets). For example, the letter F is a phonetic variant of the first letter of the Hebrew word "vav", meaning nail.

By 2700 BCE, Egyptian writing had a set of some 22 hieroglyphs to represent syllables that begin with a single consonant of their language, plus a vowel (or no vowel) to be supplied by the native speaker. These glyphs were used as pronunciation guides for logograms, to write grammatical inflections, and, later, to transcribe loan words and foreign names.

However, although seemingly alphabetic in nature, the original Egyptian uniliterals were not a system and were never used by themselves to encode Egyptian speech. In the Middle Bronze Age an apparently "alphabetic" system is thought by some to have been developed in central Egypt around 1700 BCE for or by Semitic workers, but we cannot read these early writings and their exact nature remains open to interpretation.

Over the next five centuries this Semitic "alphabet" (really a syllabary like Phoenician writing) seems to have spread north. All subsequent alphabets around the world with the sole exception of Korean Hangul have either descended from it, or been inspired by one of its descendants.

Scholars agree that there is a relationship between the West-Semitic alphabet and the creation of the Greek alphabet. There is debate between scholars regarding the earliest uses of the Greek alphabet because of the changes that were made to create the Greek alphabet.

The Greek alphabet had the following characteristics:

1. The Greek lettering we know of today traces back to the eighth century BCE
2. Early Greek scripts used the twenty-two West-Semitic letters and included five supplementary letters.
3. Early Greek was not uniform in structure, and had many local variations.
4. The Greek lettering was written using a lapidary style of writing.
5. Greek was written in a boustrophedon style.

Scholars believe that at one point in time, early Greek scripts were very close to the West-Semitic alphabet. Over time, the changes that were made to the Greek alphabet were introduced as a result of the need for the Greeks to find a better way to express their spoken language in a more accurate way.

=== Timeline of writing technology ===
- 30,000 BCE – In ice-age Europe, people mark ivory, bone, and stone with patterns to keep track of time, using a lunar calendar.
- 14,000 BCE – In what is now Mezhirich, Ukraine, the first known artifact with a map on it is made using bone.
- Prior to 3500 BCE – Communication was carried out through paintings of indigenous tribes.
- 3500s BCE – The Sumerians develop cuneiform writing and the Egyptians develop hieroglyphic writing.
- 16th century BCE – The Phoenicians develop an alphabet.
- 105 – Cai Lun invents paper.
- 7th century – Hindu-Malayan empires write legal documents on copper plate scrolls, and write other documents on more perishable media.
- 751 – Paper is introduced to the Muslim world after the Battle of Talas.
- 1250 – The quill is used for writing.
- 1795 – Nicolas-Jacques Conté invents the pencil.
- 1888 – John J. Loud invents the ballpoint pen.
- 1938 – László Bíró invents the first commercially-successful ballpoint pen.

=== Urban communication ===
The study of urban communication is an interdisciplinary field that examines how communication is shaped by urban life and addresses the urban city experience with cities as communicative environments. Urban communication views cities themselves as complex communicative spaces where the surrounding environment, infrastructure, and communities the citizens create are means of exchanging or carrying messages and interpersonal interactions.

It also accounts for modern digital media such as smartphones or the internet becoming increasingly popular since the 1990s and early 2000s, which allows for accessible, real-time exchanges between individuals and groups who want to give and receive information in industrialized countries.

=== Timeline of printing technology ===
- 1305 – The Chinese develop wooden block movable type printing.
- 1406 – Toni Bell invents the Wordwheel, a mechanical contraption that turns out text.
- 1440 – Johannes Gutenberg invents a printing press with metal movable type.
- 1844 – Charles Fenerty produces paper from a wood pulp, eliminating rag paper which was in limited supply.
- 1849 – Associated Press organizes Nova Scotia pony express to carry latest European news for New York newspapers.
- 1938 – Chester Carlson invents the first photocopier suitable for office use.
- 1959 – Xerox begins sales of the Xerox 914 photocopier.

== History of telecommunication ==
The history of telecommunication - the transmission of signals over a distance for communication - began thousands of years ago with the use of smoke signals and drums in Africa, America and parts of Asia. In the 1790s the first fixed semaphore systems emerged in Europe however it was not until the 1830s that electrical telecommunication systems started to appear.

=== Morse code ===
Morse code was invented by Samuel F. B. Morse, who originally built telegraph lines in 1837. The telegraph is considered to be of the most revolutionary inventions in regards to telecommunication history with its use in World War 2. Morse Code has a symbiotic relationship with the telegraph because the invention of the code allowed for the creation of messages, and the telegraph was able to transmit the message.

Morse code is operated by using telegraph keys as the transmitter device, while the operator sends out the dots as signals combined sequentially with the dashes as longer signals. On the receiving end, the receiving device would make a clicking noise that the operator would transcribe.

=== Pre-electric ===
- 26–37 CE – Roman Emperor Tiberius rules the empire from the island of Capri by signaling messages with metal mirrors to reflect the sun.
- 1520 – Ships on Ferdinand Magellan's voyage signal to each other by firing cannon and raising flags.
- 1792 – Claude Chappe invents the semaphore telegraph.

=== Telegraph ===
- 1792 – Claude Chappe establishes the first long-distance semaphore telegraph line.
- 1831 – Joseph Henry proposes and builds an electric telegraph.
- 1836 – Samuel Morse develops the Morse code.
- 1843 – Samuel Morse builds the first long-distance electric telegraph line.
- 1899 – The Marconi Wireless Telegraph Company of America was incorporated in New Jersey, and Spencer Trask & Co., an American investment service, underwrote the IPO. This was a subsidiary of the British Wireless Telegraph and Signal Company.

=== Landline telephone ===
- 1876 – Alexander Graham Bell and Thomas A. Watson exhibit an electric telephone along with making the first official call in Boston
- 1889 – Almon Brown Strowger patents the direct dial

=== Phonograph ===
- 1877 – Thomas Edison patents the phonograph.
- 1977 – William K. Heine invents the laser turntable.
- 1997 – ELP offers the first commercial laser turntable for sale, the LT-1XA.

=== Radio and television ===
- 1895 – Guglielmo Marconi, an inventor and electrical engineer, used radio waves to transmit signals over a large distance.
- 1920 – Radio station KDKA based in Pittsburgh began the first broadcast.
- 1924 – Bell Laboratories invents the first two-way, voice-based radio telephone.
- 1925 – John Logie Baird transmits the first television signal.
- 1942 – Hedy Lamarr and George Antheil invent frequency-hopping spread spectrum communication technique.
- 1947 – The first full-scale television commercial is broadcast.
- 1963 – The first geosynchronous communications satellite is launched, 17.5 years after Arthur C. Clarke's article.
- 1999 – Sirius Satellite Radio is introduced.

=== Fax ===
- 1843 – Patent issued for the "Electric Printing Telegraph," a very early forerunner of the fax machine
- 1926 – Commercial availability of the radioax
- 1964 – First modern fax machine commercially available (Long Distance Xerography)
- 1996 – First internet fax machine.

=== Mobile telephone ===
- 1947 – Douglas H. Ring and W. Rae Young of Bell Labs propose a cell-based approach which led to "cellular phones."
- 1957 – Leonid Kupriyanovich invents the LK-1 mobile radio telephone, the first to use code-division multiple access.
- 1965 – Chandros Rypinski, Jr. patents the first multiple-channel radio telephone system, which was licensed to Bell Labs (patent no. US3173996A).
- 1973 – Martin Cooper, then an employee of Motorola, made the first mobile phone call.
- 1981 – Comvik introduces the world's first automatic mobile phone service followed a week later by Nordic Mobile Telephone.
- 1981 – Millicom Inc., a telecommunications agency, and E.F. Johnson & Co. introduced the first portable cellular phone commercially available for use on a cellular network. It was called the "Lunch Box."
- 1983 – Motorola launches the DynaTAC 8000X or the "Brick," the first commercially available handheld mobile phone weighing 3 pounds (1.4 kg).
- 1986 – Technophone, under the guidance of the company's then-chief executive officer, Nils Martensson, released the first pocket-sized mobile phone, the Excell PCT105.
- 1991 – GSM is put into operation
- 1992 – Neil Papworth sends the first SMS (or text message), on the Vodafone network.
- 1996 – Motorola StarTAC mobile phone introduced. It was significantly smaller than previous cellphones.
- 2001 – The first commercial launch of 3G was also by NTT DoCoMo in Japan
- 2007 – iPhone is launched
- 2009 – The first commercial LTE deployment
- 2014 – The number of mobile connections surpasses the global population.
- 2019 – The first 5G networks were launched in South Korea

=== Computers and Internet ===
- 1946 – The University of Pennsylvania introduces ENIAC, the first programmable, electronic, general-purpose digital computer
- 1949 – Claude Shannon, the "father of information theory", mathematically proves the Nyquist–Shannon sampling theorem.
- 1957 – Gordon Gould invents the laser and the optical amplifier.
- 1965 – First email sent (at MIT).
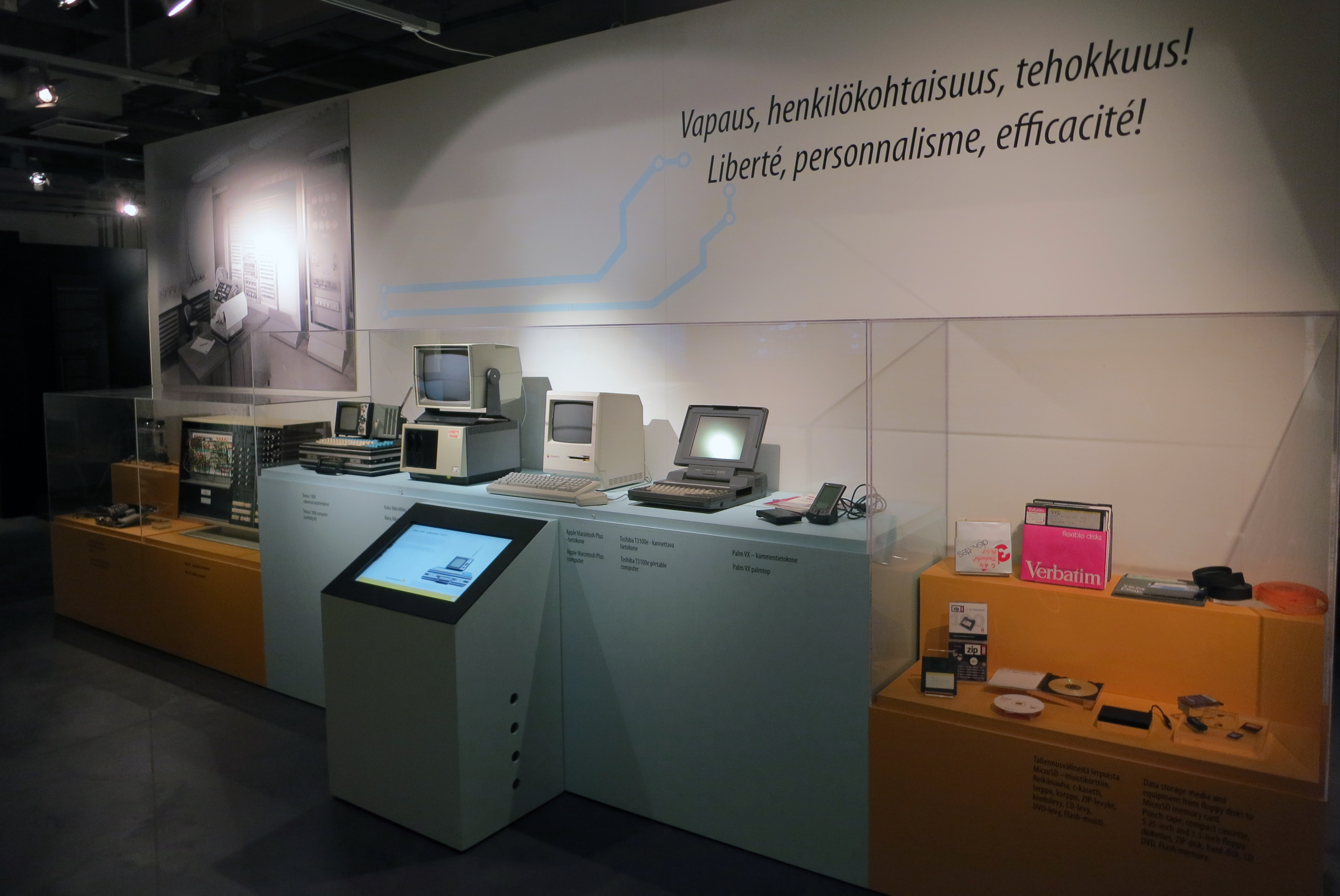
  Exhibition space at Rupriikki Media Museum in Tampere, Finland
- 1966 – Charles K. Kao realizes that silica-based optical waveguides offer a practical way to transmit light via total internal reflection.
- 1969 – The first hosts of ARPANET, Internet's ancestor, are connected.

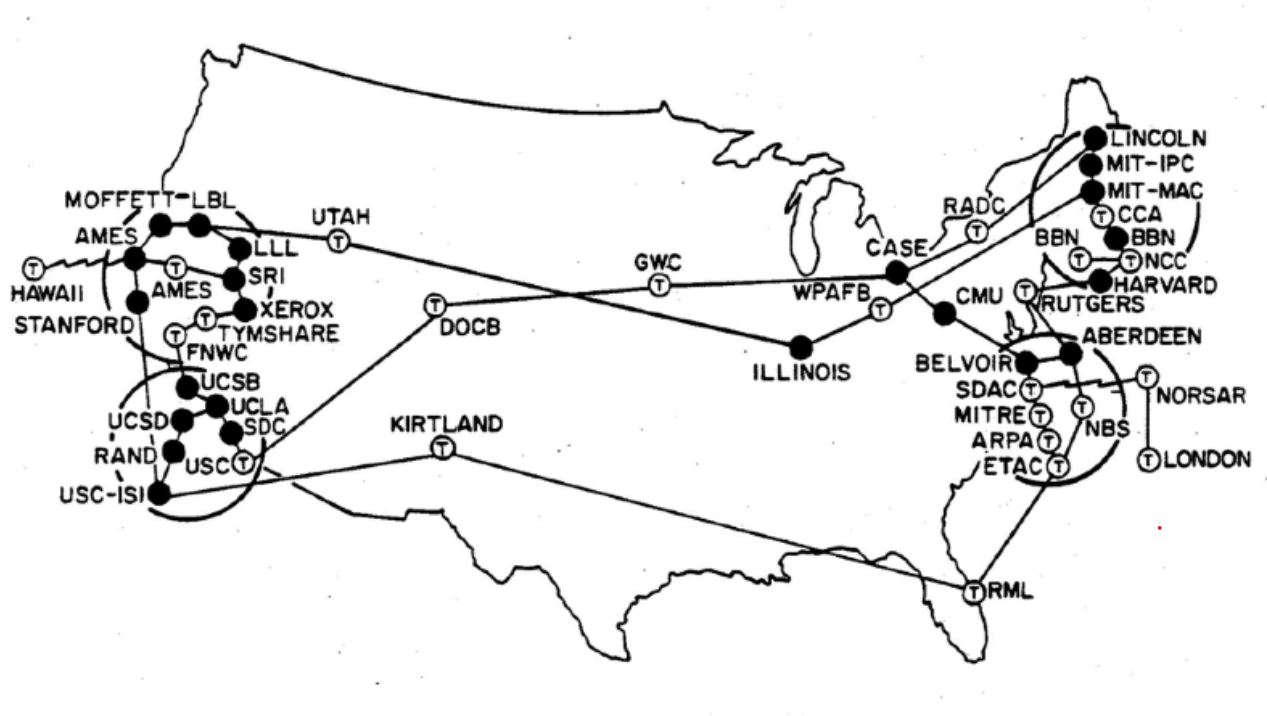
ARPANET access points in the 1970s

- 1971 – Erna Schneider Hoover invents a computerized switching system for telephone traffic.
- 1971 – 8-inch floppy disk removable storage medium for computers is introduced.
- 1973 – Optelecom, Inc. delivers the first operational optical communications system under an ARPA contract to the US Army Missile Command, and the first commercial fiber optic system to Chevron.
- 1975 – First list servers are introduced.
- 1976 – The personal computer (PC) market is born.
- 1977 – Donald Knuth begins work on TeX.
- 1980 – Usenet is established.
- 1981 – Hayes Smartmodem introduced.
- 1983 – Microsoft Word software is launched.
- 1985 – AOL is launched.
- 1988 – Internet Relay Chat (IRC) is released.
- 1989 – Tim Berners-Lee and Robert Cailliau build the prototype system which became the World Wide Web at CERN.
- 1989 – WordPerfect 5.1 word processing software released.
- 1989 – Lotus Notes software is launched.
- 1990 – Archie, the world's first search engine, was released.
- 1990 – Adobe Photoshop is released.
- 1991 – Anders Olsson transmits solitary waves through an optical fiber with a data rate of 32 billion bits per second.
- 1992 – Internet2 organization is created.
- 1992 – IBM ThinkPad 700C laptop computer created. It was lightweight compared to its predecessors.
- 1993 – Tim Bernes-Lee released the World Wide Web to the general public.

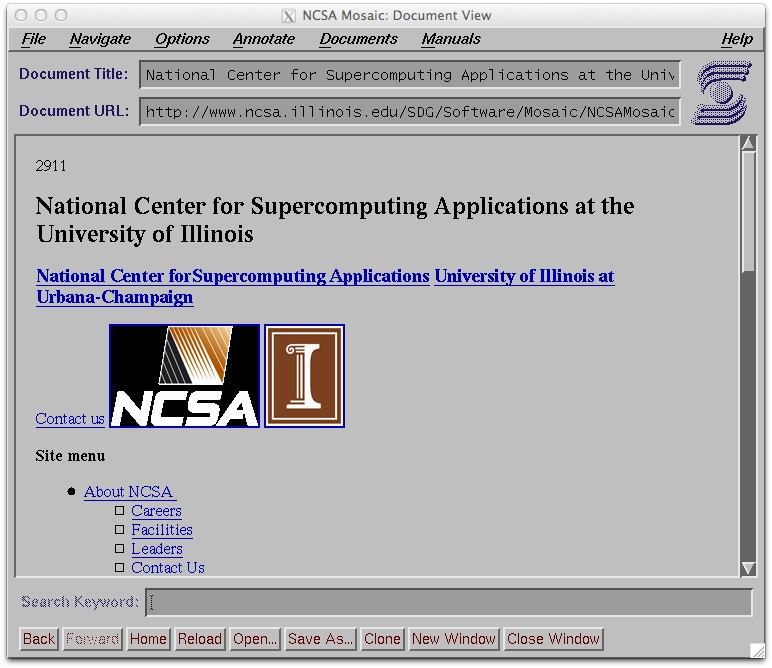
Screenshot of NCSA Mosaic browser

- 1993 – Mosaic graphical web browser is launched. It was one of the first browsers to display images in line with text and not in a separate window.
- 1994 – Internet radio broadcasting is born.
- 1995 – Yahoo, an American web services provider, is launched.
- 1996 – The first Dense Wave Division Multiplexing (WDM) system was installed Ciena Corp under the guidance of co-founder David Huber. WDM subsequently became the common basis of all telecommunications networks and a foundation of the Internet.
- 1997 – SixDegrees.com is launched, the first of several early social networking services.
- 1998 – Google, an advanced search engine, is launched.
- 1999 – Napster peer-to-peer file sharing is launched.
- 1999 – XMPP is released.
- 2001 – Cyworld adds social networking features and becomes the first of several mass-market social networking service
- 2003 – Skype video calling software is launched.
- 2004 – Facebook is launched, becoming the largest social networking site in 2009.
- 2004 – Gmail is launched.
- 2005 – YouTube, the video-sharing site, is launched.
- 2005 – Reddit is launched.
- 2006 – Twitter is launched.
- 2007 – iPhone is launched.
- 2009 – WhatsApp is launched.
- 2010 – Instagram is launched.
- 2011 – Snapchat is launched.
- 2013 – Telegram is launched.
- 2014 – Signal is launched.
- 2015 – Discord is launched.
- 2017 – Teams is launched.

== See also ==
- Animal communication
- Biocommunication (science)
- Biosemiotics
- Cylcon
- Historical linguistics
- History of ancient numeral systems
- History of art
- History of writing
- Message stick
- Plant communication
- Prehistoric counting
- Proto-writing
