= VisualAudio =

Method of retrieving sound from the picture of a record

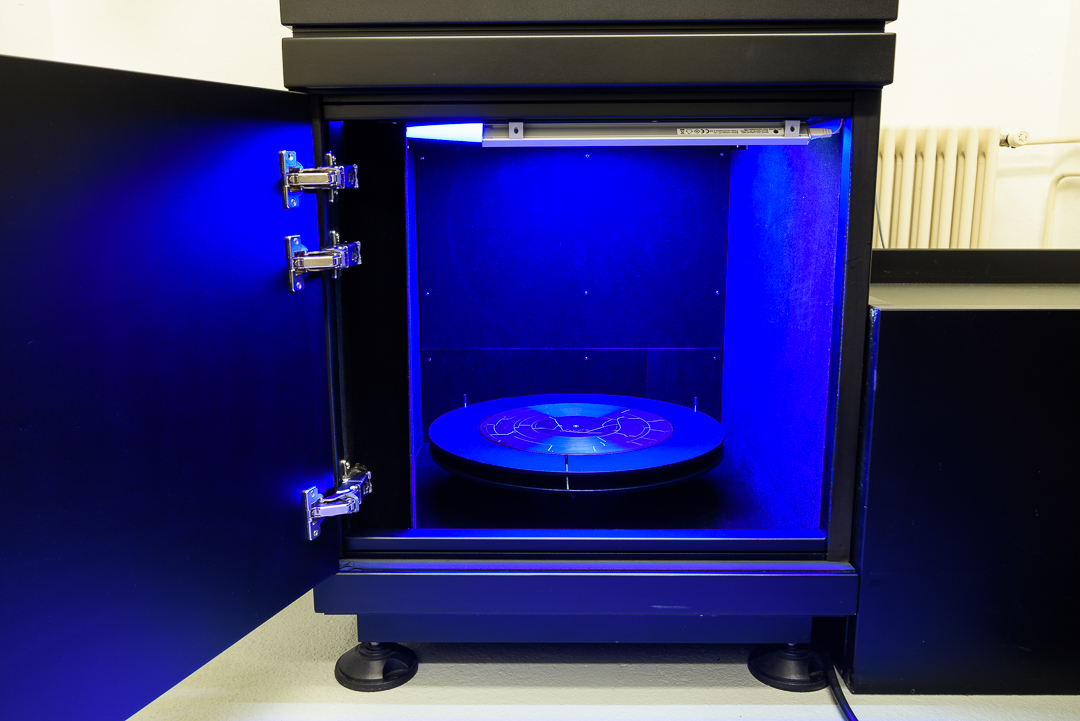
VisualAudio

VisualAudio is a project that retrieves sound from a picture of a phonograph record. It originated from a partnership between the Swiss National Sound Archives and the School of Engineering and Architecture of Fribourg.

== Introduction ==
Discs were the only means of preserving sound before the introduction of magnetic tapes. Until the advent of the vinyl in the 1950s, the records were made of shellac or wax. The organic composition of these materials enabled them to degrade over time and also made them prone to attack by fungi.

As a result, many records, including unique original radio productions, are in a state of deterioration which precludes play by traditional mechanical means, hence the interest in a non-contact approach.

== History ==
The idea of this recovery of the sound of old records through optical scanning started in the summer of 1999 in Lugano, among the technical manager of the Swiss National Sound Archives (Fonoteca Nazionale) Stefano S. Cavaglieri (creator and holder of the intellectual property, initiator of the project), the former director of M & C Management and Communications SA Pierre Hemmer (co-creator of the project), and the Director of the Swiss National Sound Archives Pio Pellizzari (co-creator of the project).

The Fribourg school of engineering and architecture (Hochschule für Technik und Architektur Freiburg) was the main partner, at first studying its feasibility and then starting a project that progressed over years.

== Principle ==
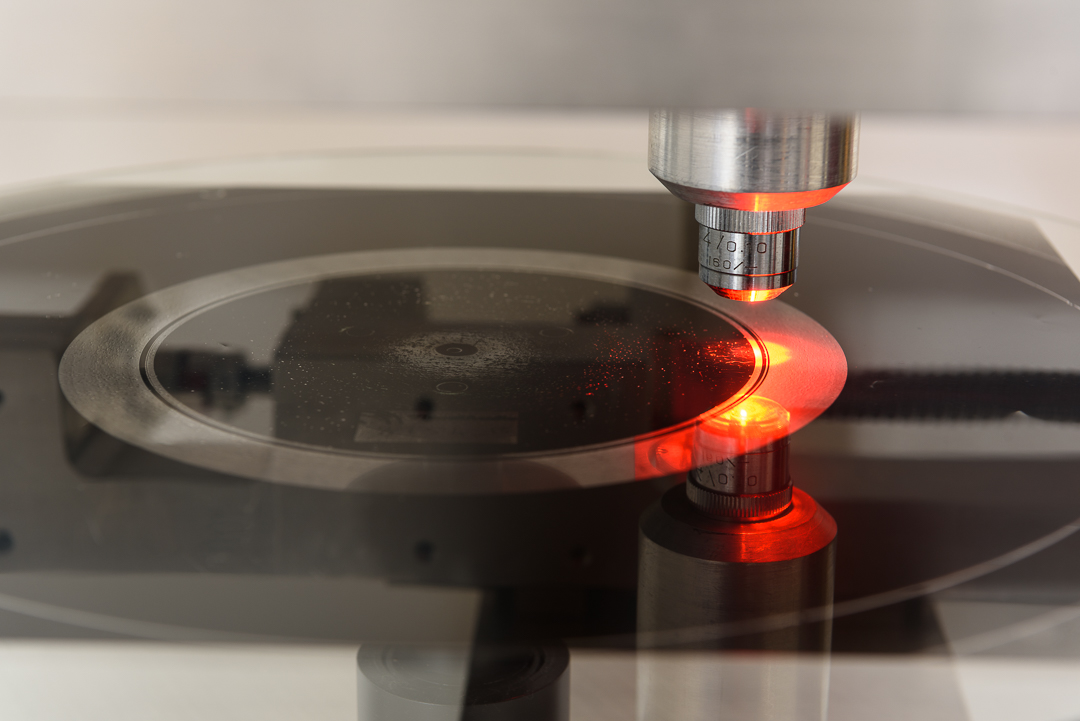
Image processing

During normal playback of a phonograph record, sound is obtained by a stylus following the groove. The radial displacement of the groove is observable through a microscope which means that sound information is visible.

If a high-resolution analog picture of each side of the record is taken and the information in the film is then digitised using a circular scanner, various algorithms can process the image in order to extract and reconstruct the sound.

== Method ==
=== Photography ===
A central part of the process is photo shooting. It is performed at the beginning of the process on a properly cleaned record, in order to archive it as a film.

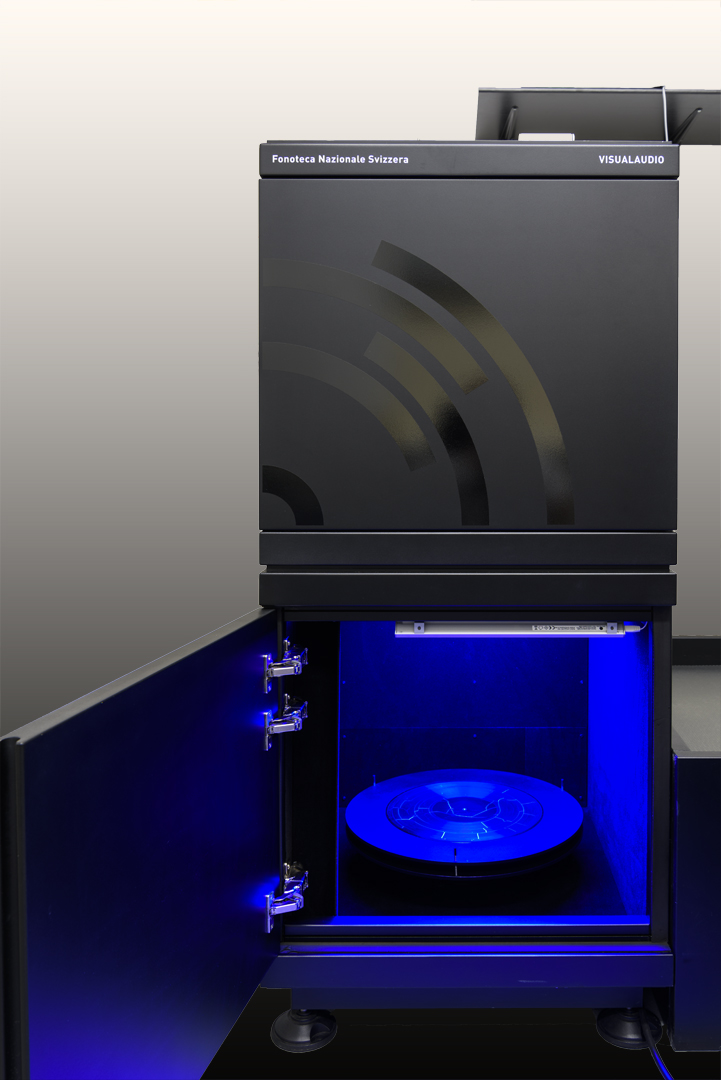

The photographic film has a high resolution of 600 lines per mm. This resolution is sufficient to accurately follow the groove displacement.

=== Scanning process ===
Once the record content is stored on a photographic film, the next step is to recover the original sound. The University of Applied Sciences of Fribourg built a scanner prototype to do this.

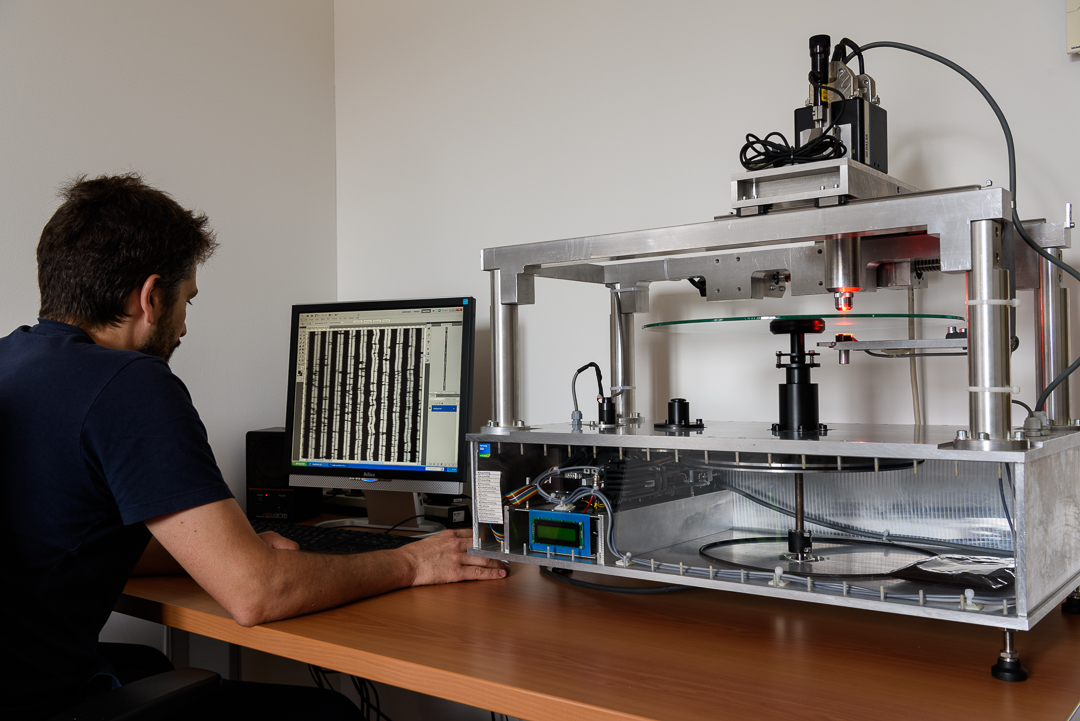
Latest version of the scanner

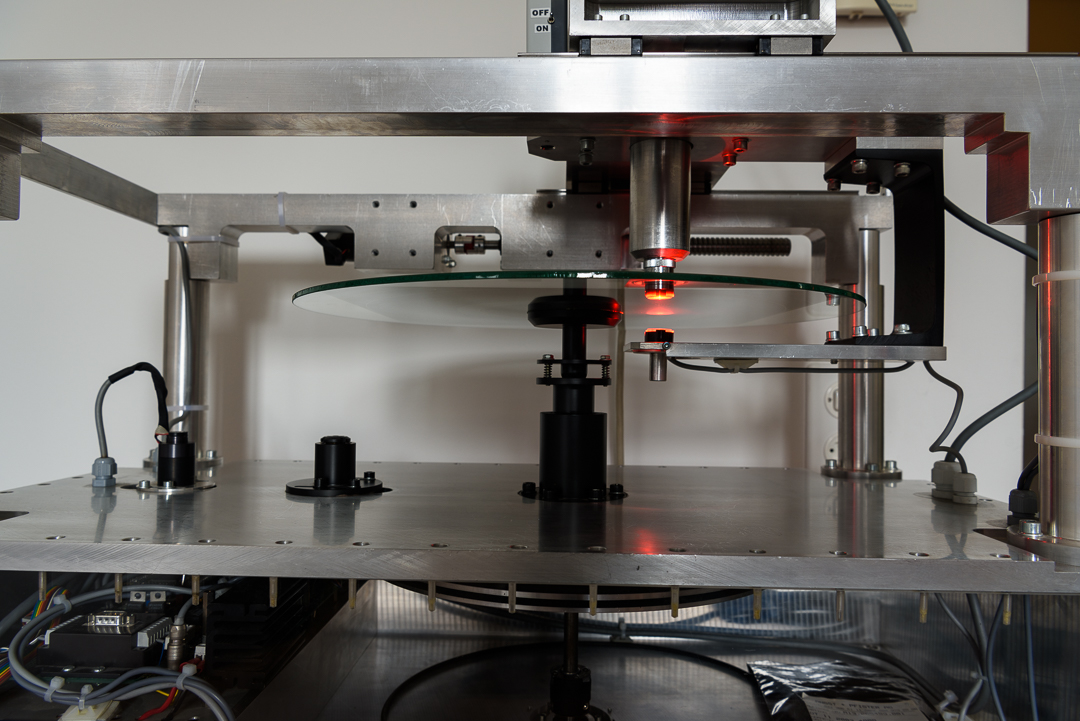
Latest version of the scanner

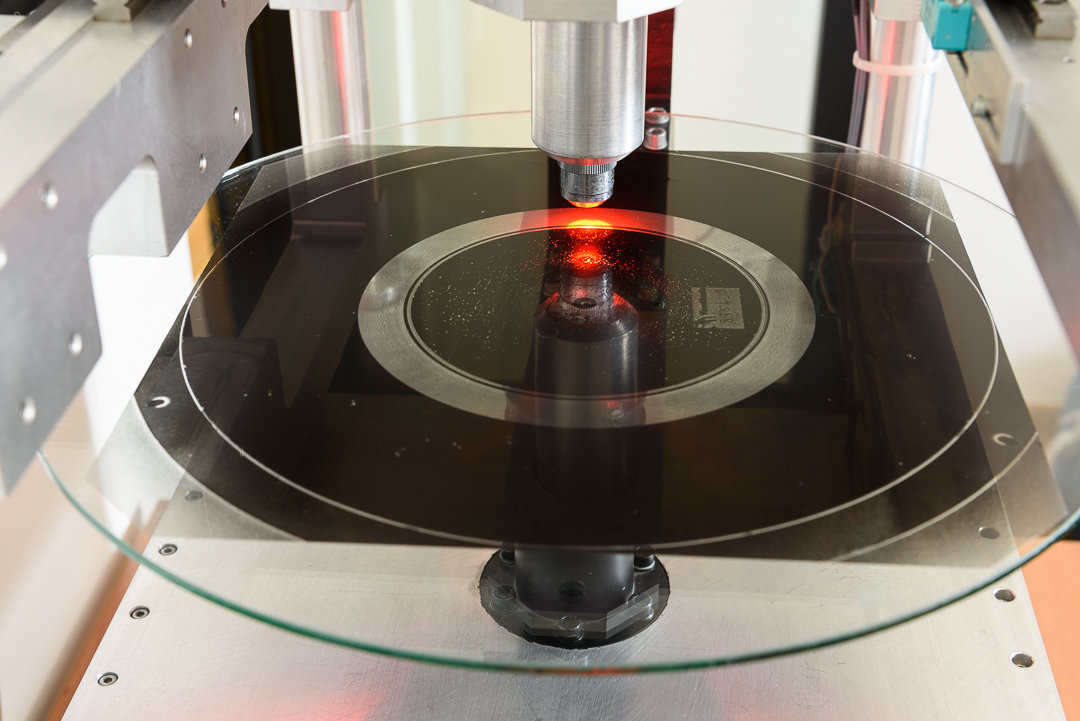
Latest version of the scanner

The current version of the scanner is made of a glass rotating plate, on which is placed the film. The digitisation of the image is done by a linear CCD camera of 2048 pixels wide, which takes pictures at regular intervals, with frequencies ranging from 25,000 to 200,000 lines per rotation. The combination of the camera with the rotating film delivers a rotary scan of the record in the form of a rectangular picture of a ring. A second radial movement provides the next ring.

=== Image processing ===
Once digitized, the images are processed to analyze and determine the positions and displacement of the groove. The first step is to correct the imperfections of the captured images. Many disturbances can come from various stages of the acquisition process: the record itself (cracks, scratches, dust), the photography (film grain), or the scanning (dust, optics, CCD sensors).

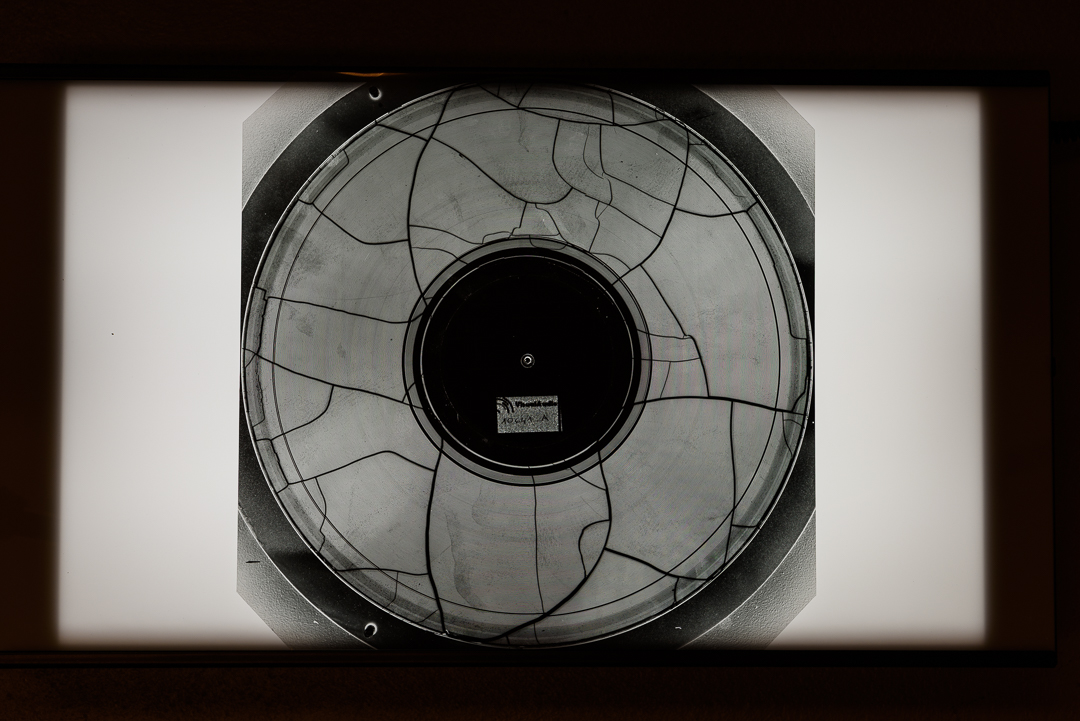
Cracks on a record

Then, the groove position is estimated using edge detection algorithms. Once the edges are detected, corrections requiring more complex knowledge about the structure of the image are carried out. Some examples of corrections:

- Interpolation if the groove is interrupted
- If an edge of the groove is damaged, the information provided by the other side of the groove is useful

=== Sound extraction ===
The final step is converting groove displacement into an audible signal. This signal is processed by band-pass filters in order to obtain only the bandwidth of the original recording. Some frequency equalizations (for instance RIAA) are implemented.

This project aims to retrieve and archive the sound as close as possible to the original one. By default, audio restoration is not applied.

=== Broken records ===
The ultimate goal of this project is getting sound out of an otherwise forever lost record.

Many records from the 1940s are cracked and definitely unplayable. The result is an interesting jigsaw puzzle. As the cracks are due to the shrinkage of the lacquer, there is no material loss in most of the cases. To solve this problem, in November 2006, the Swiss National Sound Archives started a project funded by the Gebert Rüf Foundation. The results so far are encouraging. The algorithm basically uses signal features to determine whether two groove parts are contiguous or not.

The project is still in a test validation phase, but some sound is already available.

=== System quality ===
Reaching the same quality as good as an original record replayed on a modern turntable is probably unrealistic. Originally around 20 dB in the early prototype, the signal-to-noise ratio of modern system is situated around 19 dB for a good 78 rpm record.

== Advantages and disadvantages ==
With its intermediate photographic stage, this solution solves several significant challenges found in archiving systems.

- Speed of the archiving process, because of the relatively short time for the photo-shooting.
- The storage of information occurs on an analog film so it is not reliant on a technology that could become quickly obsolete and the freezing and storing of the record's state in a new format allows the retrieval of the information later using new technologies.
- The periodic transfer to new data storage media is avoided because the photographic film has a life span of several hundred years.
- The possibility of using the system for vertical cut records.

Disadvantages of the system:

- Not usable for wax cylinders
- Some irregularities such as rounded or bulging records, which do not affect play on a traditional turntable, can influence the sound of VisualAudio.

== Recovered files ==
Among the unique audio files recovered with such techniques, the speech of Italian politician and poet Aldo Spallicci.

== See also ==
- Laser turntable
- IRENE (Image, Reconstruct, Erase Noise, Etc.) technology

== Bibliography ==
- Cavaglieri, Stefano S. "Practical VisualAudio: A Long Journey to Tangible Results". Sustainable Audiovisual Collections Through Collaboration: Proceedings of the 2016 Joint Technical Symposium. Indiana University Press, 2017.
- Johnsen, Ottar, et al. "Detection of the Groove Position in Phonographic Images." 2007 IEEE International Conference on Image Processing. Vol. 6. IEEE, 2007.
- Stotzer, Sylvain, et al. "Groove extraction of phonographic records". Document Analysis Systems VII: 7th International Workshop, DAS 2006, Nelson, New Zealand, February 13-15, 2006. Proceedings 7. Springer Berlin Heidelberg, 2006.
- Johnsen, Stefano S. Cavaglieri–Prof Ottar, and Frédéric Bapst. "Optical Retrieval and Storage of Analog Sound Recordings."
- Stotzer, Sylvain, et al. "Phonographic sound extraction using image and signal processing. " 2004 IEEE International Conference on Acoustics, Speech, and Signal Processing. Vol. 4. IEEE, 2004.
- Stotzer, Sylvain, et al. "Visualaudio: an optical technique to save the sound of phonographic records." IASA Journal (2003): 38-47.
- Stotzer, Sylvain. VisualAudio: Caractéristiques matérielles des disques phonographiques. Département d'informatique, Université de Fribourg, 2003.
- Johnsen, Ottar, et al. "VisualAudio: eine optische Technik zur Bewahrung phonographischer Auf-nahmen".
- Fadeyev, Vitaliy, and Carl Haber. "Reconstruction of mechanically recorded sound by image processing." Journal of the Audio Engineering Society 51.12 (2003): 1172-1185.
- McCann, M., P. Calamia, and N. Ailon. "Audio Extraction from Optical Scans of Records". (2004).
- Tian, Baozhong, and John L. Barron. "Reproduction of sound signal from gramophone records using 3d scene reconstruction." Irish Machine Vision and Image Processing Conference. 2006.
- Stotzer, Sylvain. Phonographic record sound extraction by image processing. Diss. Université de Fribourg, 2006.
- Cornell, Earl W., et al. "Using optical metrology to reconstruct sound recordings." Nuclear Instruments and Methods in Physics Research Section A: Accelerators, Spectrometers, Detectors and Associated Equipment 579.2 (2007): 901-904.
- Li, Beinan, Simon de Leon, and Ichiro Fujinaga. "Alternative Digitization Approach for Stereo Phonograph Records Using Optical Audio Reconstruction." ISMIR. 2007.
- Boltryk, P. J., et al. "Noncontact surface metrology for preservation and sound recovery from mechanical sound recordings". Journal of the Audio Engineering Society 56.7/8 (2008): 545-559.
- Aleksandrović, Vesna. "Analog/digital sound. National Library of Serbia digital collection of 78 rpm gramophone records." Review of National Center for Digitization 12 (2008): 37-42.
- Li, Beinan, Jordan BL Smith, and Ichiro Fujinaga. "Optical Audio Reconstruction for Stereo Phonograph Records Using White Light Interferometry." ISMIR. 2009.
- Tian, Baozhong, Samuel Sambasivam, and John Barron. "Practical digital playback of gramophone records using flat-bed scanner images". Audio Engineering Society Convention 131. Audio Engineering Society, 2011.
- Tian, Baozhong, and John L. Barron. "Using computer vision technology to play gramophone records". Journal of the Audio Engineering Society 59.7/8 (2011): 514-538.
- Janukiewicz, Kristofer. "A Laser Triangulation Approach for Optical Audio Reconstruction of Phonograph Records." (2016).
- Cavaglieri, Stefano S. "Practical VisualAudio: A Long Journey to Tangible Results." Sustainable Audiovisual Collections Through Collaboration: Proceedings of the 2016 Joint Technical Symposium. Indiana University Press, 2017. ISBN 9780253027139
- Chenot, Jean-Hugues, Louis Laborelli, and Jean-Etienne Noiré. "Saphir: Digitizing broken and cracked or delaminated lacquer 78 rpm records using a desktop optical scanner."
- Chenot, Jean-Hugues, Louis Laborelli, and Jean-Étienne Noiré. "Saphir: optical playback of damaged and delaminated analogue audio disc records." Journal on Computing and Cultural Heritage 11.3 (2018): 14-1.
- Hawkins, Julia, and Bryce Roe. "IRENE audio preservation at the Northeast Document Conservation Center: Developing workflows and standards for preservation projects that use innovative technology." Journal of Digital Media Management 9.3 (2021): 262-278.
- Chenot, Jean-Hugues, and Jean-Etienne Noiré. "Challenges in Optical Recovery of Otherwise Unplayable Analogue Audio Disc Records." Audio Engineering Society Conference: AES 2023 International Conference on Audio Archiving, Preservation & Restoration. Audio Engineering Society, 2023.
- Using Optical Metrology to Restore Sound Recordings
- Using Physics to Restore Early Sound Recordings
- Reconstruct Sound Recordings
