= Carl Haber =

American physicist

- Born: Queens, New York, United States
- Citizenship: United States
- Education: Columbia University B.A. (1980), M.Phil. (1982), and Ph.D. (1985)
- Awards: MacArthur Fellowship (2013) Guggenheim Fellowship (2006)
- Scientific career
- Fields: Physics

Carl Haber is an American physicist. He is best known for his work in audio preservation. In 2013 he was awarded a MacArthur Fellowship.

== Career ==
Haber attended Columbia University for his B.A., M.Phil, and Ph.D. Since 1986, he has worked for the Lawrence Berkeley National Laboratory. Haber's work on the IRENE system has involved collaboration with the Smithsonian and the Library of Congress. Methods invented by Haber have been credited with restoring the earliest known recording of a human voice, as well as early recordings of Alexander Graham Bell's voice.

He was elected a Fellow of the American Physical Society in 2001.
