= IRENE (technology) =

Digital imaging technology

IRENE (Image, Reconstruct, Erase Noise, Etc.) is a digital imaging technology designed to recover analog audio stored on fragile or deteriorating phonograph cylinders, records, and other grooved audio media. It is in use by several archives and preservation institutions in the United States seeking to preserve and digitize historical audio.

== History ==
The technology was developed at Lawrence Berkeley National Laboratory by Carl Haber and Vitaliy Fadeyev and was announced in a publication of the Journal of the Audio Engineering Society in 2003. It grew out of Haber's research in particle physics; in the 1990s, he had worked on Higgs boson detection experiments, and realized that the cameras he was using to set the detectors could also be used for detailed imaging of grooved audio recordings. The name IRENE is a backronym of the phrase "Image, Reconstruct, Erase Noise, Etc.", and was chosen because the first audio recovered by the system was a recording of the song "Goodnight, Irene" by The Weavers. By 2005, Haber and Fadeyev had developed two-dimensional and three-dimensional machines, capable of recovering audio from vertically-cut and laterally-cut grooved media. Soon after, Haber and Fadeyev were contacted by the Library of Congress, which began operating its own machine in 2006. In 2013, Haber was awarded a MacArthur Fellowship to continue development of the system. As of 2020, IRENE machines are operated by three institutions – Lawrence Berkeley National Laboratory, the Library of Congress, and the Northeast Document Conservation Center.

== Design and operation ==
The IRENE system uses a high-powered confocal microscope that follows the groove path as the disc or cylinder (i.e. phonograph cylinder) rotates underneath it, thereby obtaining detailed images of the audio information. Depending on whether the groove is cut laterally, vertically, or in a V-shape, the system may make use of tracking lasers or different lighting strategies to make the groove visible to the camera. The resulting images are then processed with software that converts the movement of the groove into a digital audio file.

An advantage of the system over traditional stylus playback is that it is contactless, and so avoids damaging the audio carrier or wearing out the groove during playback. It also allows for the reconstruction of already broken or damaged media such as cracked cylinders or delaminating lacquer discs, which cannot be played with a stylus. Media played on machines which are no longer produced can also be recovered. Many skips or damaged areas can be reconstituted by IRENE without the noises that would be created by stylus playback. However, it can also result in the reproduction of more noise, as imperfections in the groove are also more finely captured than with a stylus.

== Uses ==
Au clair de la lune
Earliest recognizable recording of human voice, from 9 April 1860, converted into sound by IRENE

Au clair de la lune
The recording slowed down to match what is now believed to be the correct speed; the result reveals a man's voice, presumably Scott's.

The IRENE system has been used to recover audio such as:

- The earliest recovered audio (1860), of Édouard-Léon Scott de Martinville singing "Au clair de la lune"
- Volta Laboratory recordings from the 1880s, including an 1885 recording of Alexander Graham Bell's voice
- A set of cylinders for talking dolls issued by the Edison Company in 1890
- Wax cylinder recordings from 1914–1916, documenting more than 78 Indigenous languages of the Americas, including some that are no longer spoken. They include the only known recordings of Ishi, the last survivor of the Yahi people. These were collected by anthropologist A.L. Kroeber and linguist Edward Sapir, and are held by the Phoebe A. Hearst Museum of Anthropology (formerly the anthropology museum of University of California, Berkeley)
- Transcription discs from the Woody Guthrie Foundation
- A transcription disc containing rare recordings of the Stanley Brothers
- Disc recordings from the Woodberry Poetry Room at Harvard University, of poets (including T.S. Eliot, Marianne Moore, Robert Frost, Muriel Rukeyser, Ezra Pound, and Sylvia Plath) reading their own poems

== See also ==
- Laser turntable
- VisualAudio

== Bibliography ==
- Fadeyev, Vitaliy, and Carl Haber. "Reconstruction of mechanically recorded sound by image processing." Journal of the Audio Engineering Society 51.12 (2003): 1172-1185.
- McCann, M., P. Calamia, and N. Ailon. "Audio Extraction from Optical Scans of Records." (2004).
- Fadeyev, Vitaliy, et al. "Reconstruction of mechanically recorded sound from an edison cylinder using three dimensional non-contact optical surface metrology." (2004).
- Tian, Baozhong, and John L. Barron. "Reproduction of sound signal from gramophone records using 3d scene reconstruction." Irish Machine Vision and Image Processing Conference. 2006.
- Stotzer, Sylvain. Phonographic record sound extraction by image processing. Diss. Université de Fribourg, 2006.
- Cornell, Earl W., et al. "Using optical metrology to reconstruct sound recordings." Nuclear Instruments and Methods in Physics Research Section A: Accelerators, Spectrometers, Detectors and Associated Equipment 579.2 (2007): 901-904.
- Li, Beinan, Simon de Leon, and Ichiro Fujinaga. "Alternative Digitization Approach for Stereo Phonograph Records Using Optical Audio Reconstruction." ISMIR. 2007.
- Boltryk, P. J., et al. "Noncontact surface metrology for preservation and sound recovery from mechanical sound recordings." Journal of the Audio Engineering Society 56.7/8 (2008): 545-559.
- Aleksandrović, Vesna. "Analog/digital sound. National Library of Serbia digital collection of 78 rpm gramophone records." Review of National Center for Digitization 12 (2008): 37-42.
- Li, Beinan, Jordan BL Smith, and Ichiro Fujinaga. "Optical Audio Reconstruction for Stereo Phonograph Records Using White Light Interferometry." ISMIR. 2009.
- Tian, Baozhong, Samuel Sambasivam, and John Barron. "Practical digital playback of gramophone records using flat-bed scanner images." Audio Engineering Society Convention 131. Audio Engineering Society, 2011.
- Tian, Baozhong, and John L. Barron. "Using computer vision technology to play gramophone records." Journal of the Audio Engineering Society 59.7/8 (2011): 514-538.
- Janukiewicz, Kristofer. "A Laser Triangulation Approach for Optical Audio Reconstruction of Phonograph Records." (2016).
- Chenot, Jean-Hugues, Louis Laborelli, and Jean-Etienne Noiré. "Saphir: Digitizing broken and cracked or delaminated lacquer 78 rpm records using a desktop optical scanner."
- Chenot, Jean-Hugues, Louis Laborelli, and Jean-Étienne Noiré. "Saphir: optical playback of damaged and delaminated analogue audio disc records." Journal on Computing and Cultural Heritage 11.3 (2018): 14-1.
- Hawkins, Julia, and Bryce Roe. "IRENE audio preservation at the Northeast Document Conservation Center: Developing workflows and standards for preservation projects that use innovative technology." Journal of Digital Media Management 9.3 (2021): 262-278.
- Chenot, Jean-Hugues, and Jean-Etienne Noiré. "Challenges in Optical Recovery of Otherwise Unplayable Analogue Audio Disc Records." Audio Engineering Society Conference: AES 2023 International Conference on Audio Archiving, Preservation & Restoration. Audio Engineering Society, 2023.
- Using Optical Metrology to Restore Sound Recordings
- Using Physics to Restore Early Sound Recordings
- Reconstruct Sound Recordings
- United States Patent US7345975 Metrological digital audio reconstruction
