= Swiss National Sound Archives =

- Fonoteca nazionale svizzera
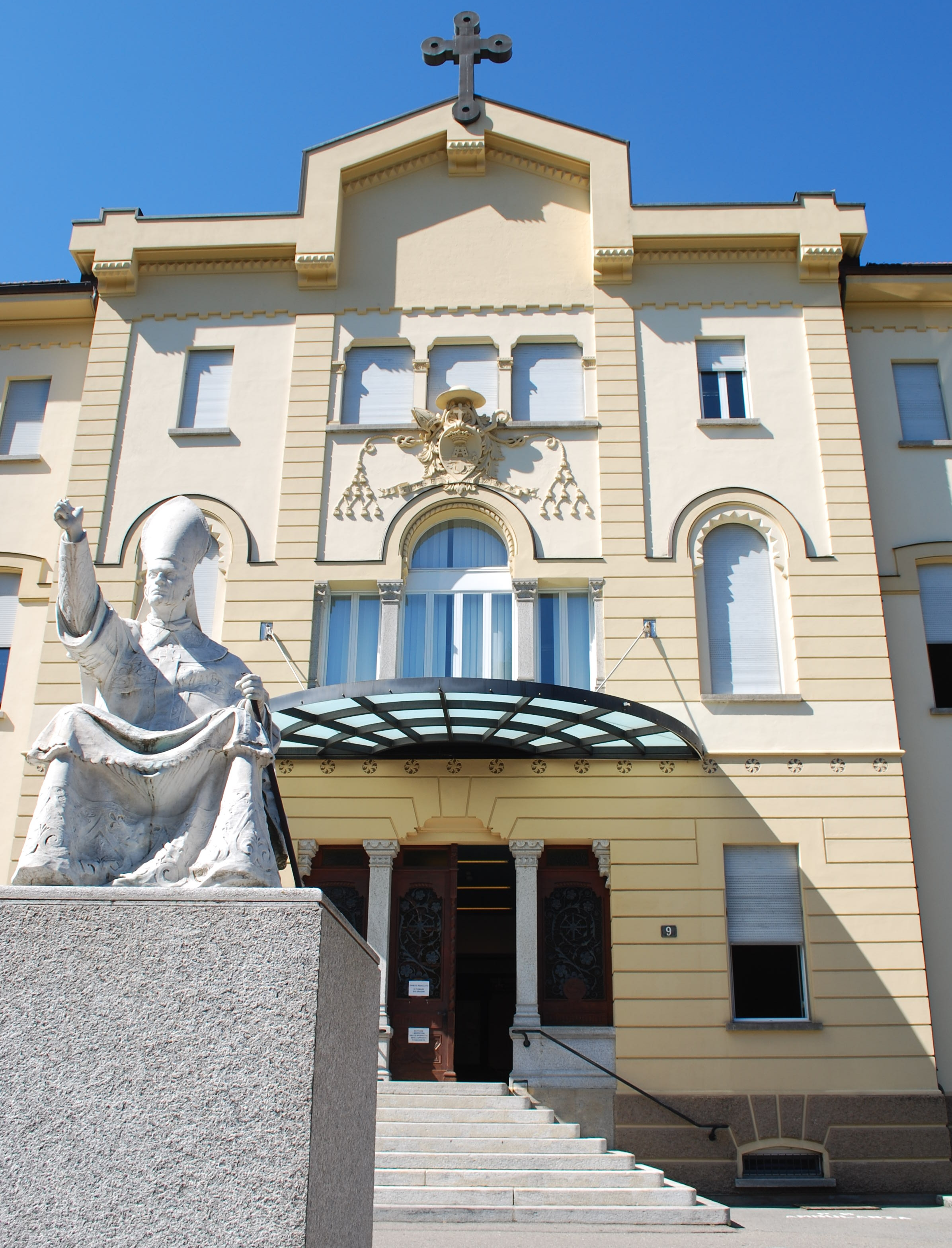
- Main entrance of Centro San Carlo which includes the Swiss National Sound Archives

- Location within Switzerland
- Established: 1984
- Location: Lugano, Switzerland
- Coordinates: 46.0060°N 8.9399°E
- Type: National Archive
- Collection size: 500,000
- Website: fonoteca.ch

The Swiss National Sound Archives are the sound archives of Switzerland, based in Lugano. Its mission is to collect sound recordings related to the history and culture of Switzerland, to make them accessible and to make them available for use. In terms of audio recordings, it thus fulfils a similar function to the Swiss National Library in the field of literature. Since 2016, the National Sound Archives have been an organisational part of the Swiss National Library. The collection has more than 500,000 audio carriers and 20–25,000 audio documents are added each year (as of 2018).

The institution is a member of the International Association of Sound and Audiovisual Archives (IASA) and the Audio Engineering Society (AES). The Swiss National Sound Archives is also a member of the Association for Recorded Sound Collections (ARSC) and the International Association of Music Libraries, Archives and Documentation Centres (IAML).

== History ==
There were 15 years between the idea of a Swiss sound archives and the actual foundation. As early as 1972, Robert Wyler, who was responsible for special collections in the Swiss National Library, suggested that a sound archives should be set up for Switzerland. Hans-Rudolf Dürrenmatt, head of the music department at the Central Library in Solothurn, also called for a sound archives in 1976. The two also held this position in the Phonotheque Commission of the Association of Swiss Librarians and the Swiss Association for Documentation. The 1975 Clottu Report (official title: "Eléments pour une politique culturelle suisse"), named after National Councillor Gaston Clottu, recommended the realisation of a phonotek. In 1980, a working group of the Federal Office of Culture presented a report on the planned Swiss National Sound Archives, which also contained a draft of a deed of foundation. However, an application to the Federal Council from the Federal Department of Home Affairs to this effect was withdrawn due to financial hurdles. In 1982, the Federal Council approved start-up financing of CHF 120,000. The city of Lugano made the former radio studio of the city available for the project free of charge.

In 1984, the "Swiss National Sound Archives Establishment Association" was founded, whose task was to set up the sound archives with the aim of transferring them to the Swiss National Library at a later date. In addition to the start-up funding provided by the Confederation, the Swiss Cooperative of Authors and Publishers of Music (SUISA) contributed 100,000 Swiss francs and the City of Lugano 163,000 Swiss francs for the conversion of the radio studio, which was completed in 1985. In 1987 the association was transformed into a foundation under private law. In addition to the canton of Ticino and the city of Lugano, the Swiss Radio and Television Society (SRG) and the collecting societies SUISA, SIG and IFPI also participated in the foundation. Since 1998 Pio Pellizzari has been director of the institution, which in 2007 was renamed from the National Sound Archives to the National Sound Archives.

In 2001, the Swiss National Sound Archives moved to the Centro San Carlo.

With the integration into the Federal Administration, which the Federal Council decided on 28 November 2014 with the adoption of the Cultural Message 2016–2020, the Foundation was dissolved with effect from 1 January 2016. In addition to the federal subsidy of CHF 1.6 million, the sound archives have received operating contributions from the Canton of Ticino (CHF 290,000) and the City of Lugano (CHF 170,000). This support will be continued. The sound archive is now integrated into the Federal Office of Culture as the "Swiss National Sound Archives Section" of the Swiss National Library.

== Collections ==
The National Sound Archives collects sound recordings with

- Works by Swiss composers and authors
- Recordings by Swiss performers
- Works published by Swiss companies

The National Sound Archives began its collecting activities in 1986, but thanks to the acquisition of various existing collections and estates, numerous sound recordings from earlier times are also available.

The current collection includes

- products of the record industry (insofar as they have been voluntarily handed over to the National Sound Archives by publishers, producers, authors and performers; in Switzerland there is no legal obligation to deliver published phonograms)
- Recordings of historical radio broadcasts (1932 to ca. 1955)
- Sound documents from scientific research
  - linguistics
  - Oral History
  - ethnography
  - anthropology
- Deposit of SUISA with audio carriers whose rights SUISA administers
- Older sound recordings of the Swiss National Library
- various collections and estates of individuals and corporations
- audio books
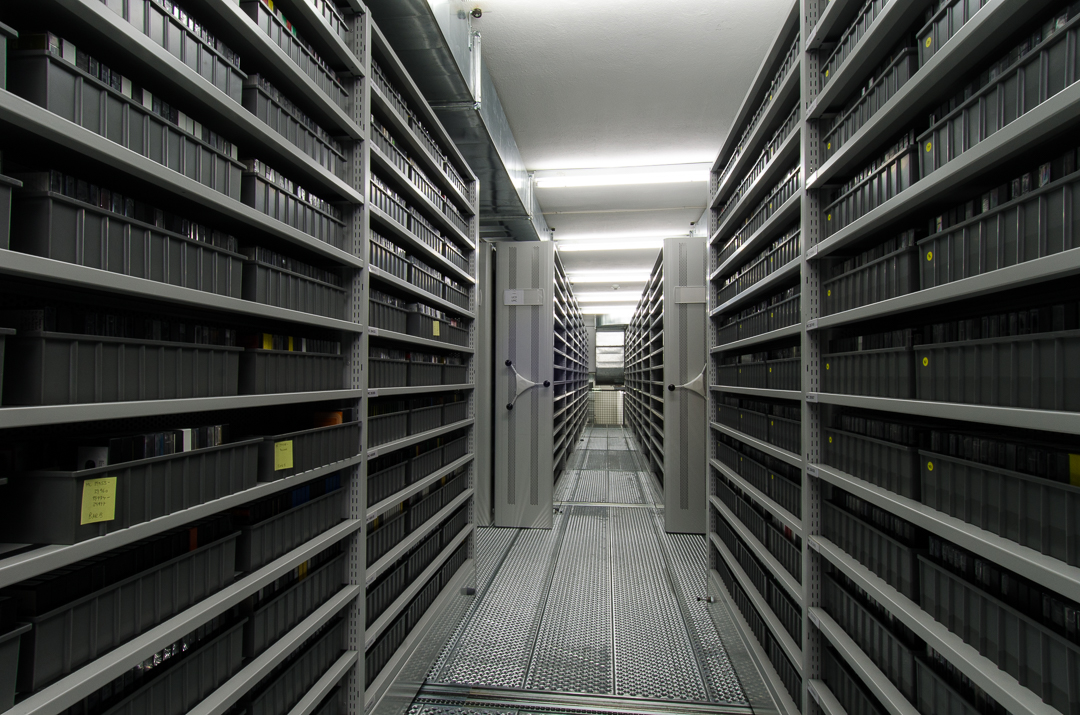
The physical archive

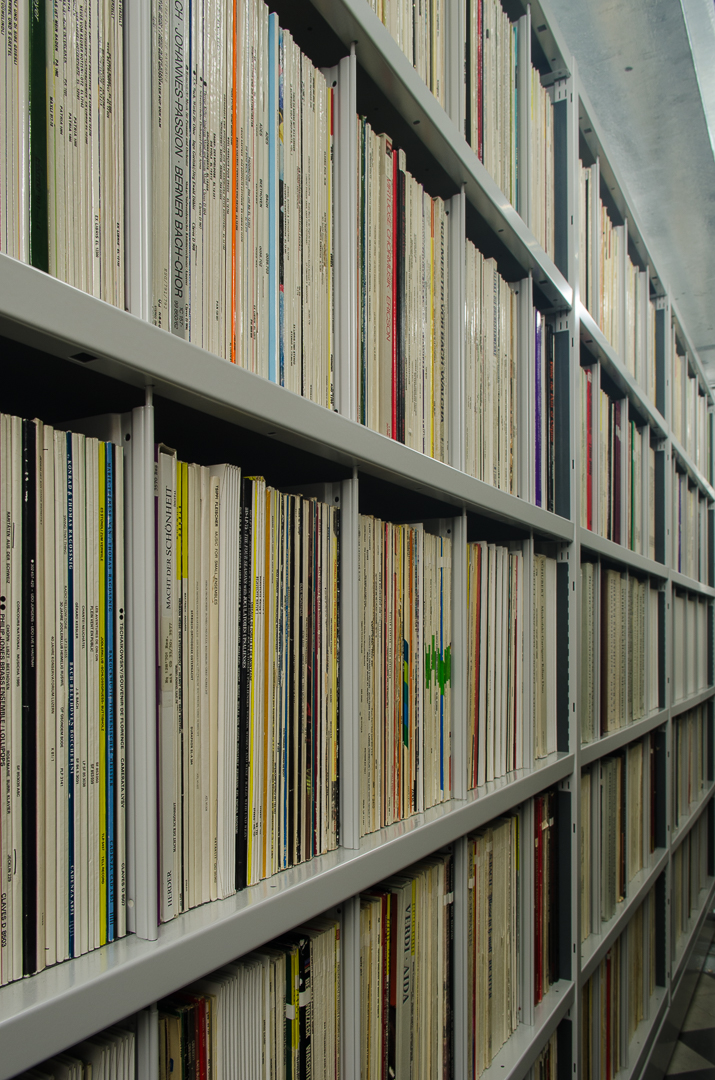
LP records

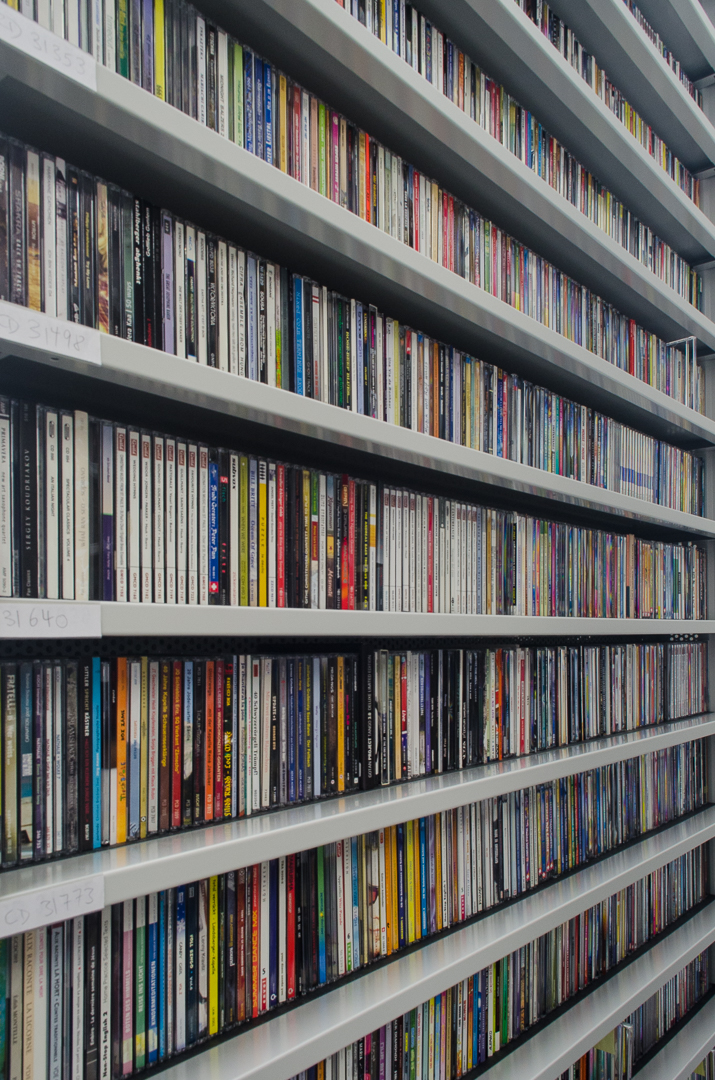
CDs

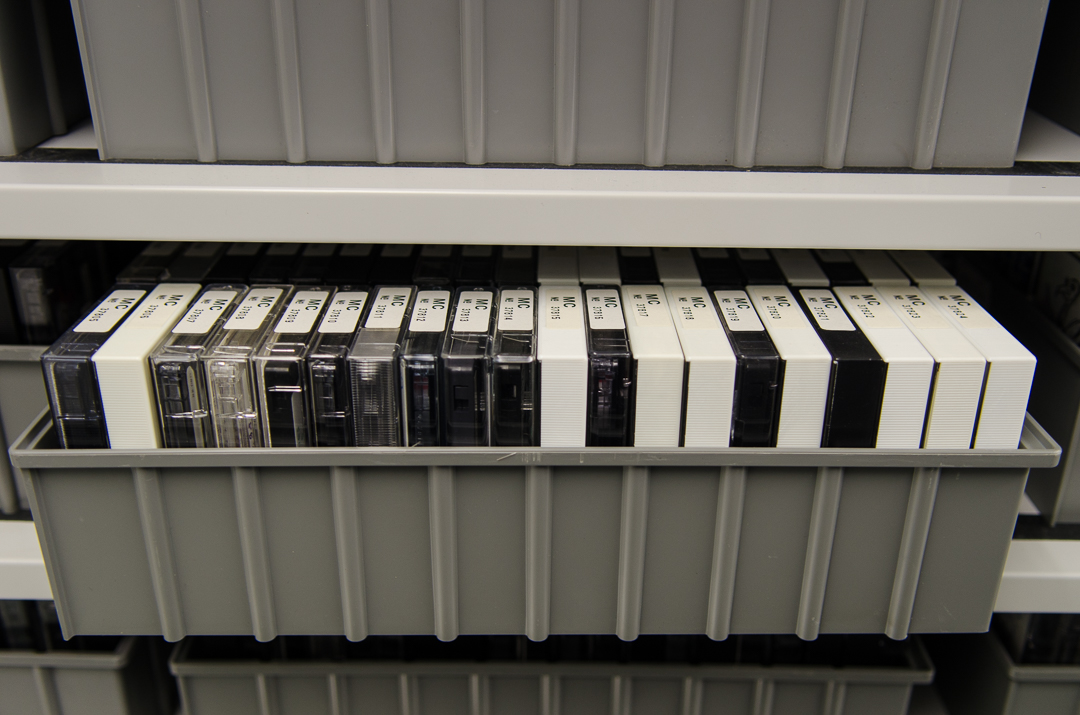
Cassettes

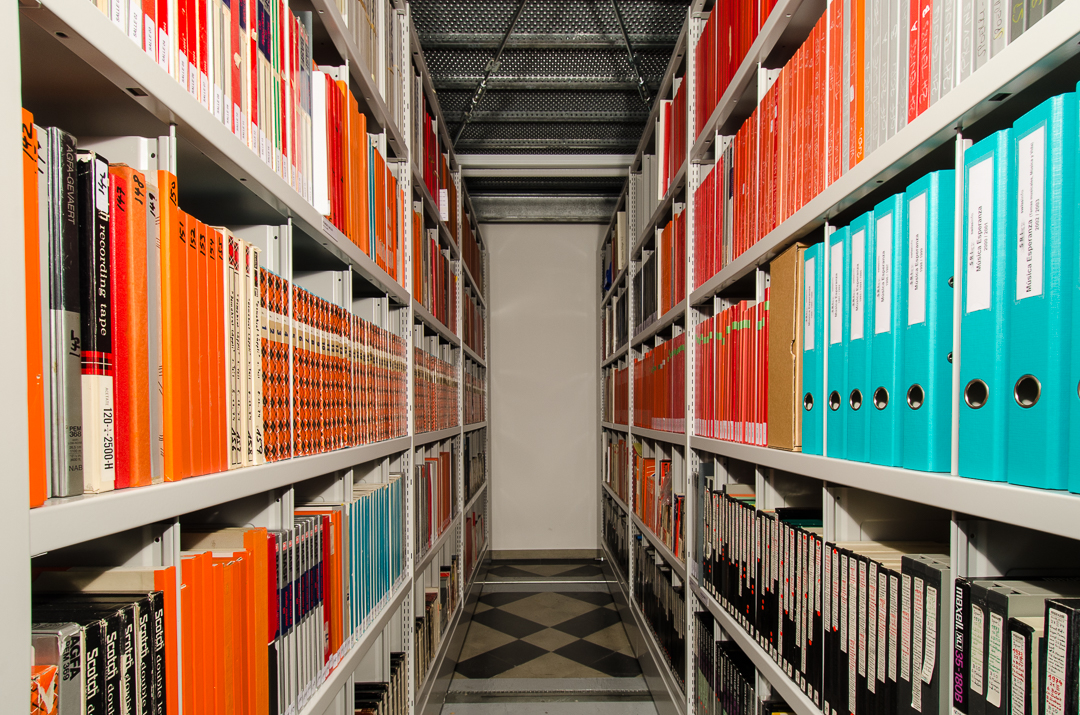
Audiotapes (left)

Among the collections acquired in 2016 are those of conductor Théo Loosli, chansonnier Pierre Dudan and recording studio Lorelei. In 2017, for example, the National Sound Archives acquired the estates of the conductor Josef Krips and the singer Caterina Valente as well as a large part of the archive of the Schaffhausen Jazz Festival. In 2018 it received, for example, the sound archive of the Tonhalle Zurich, the collection of George Mathys on jazz in French-speaking Switzerland and the collection of all previous recordings of the festival Stubete am See in Zurich, which is dedicated to Swiss folk music.

== Services ==
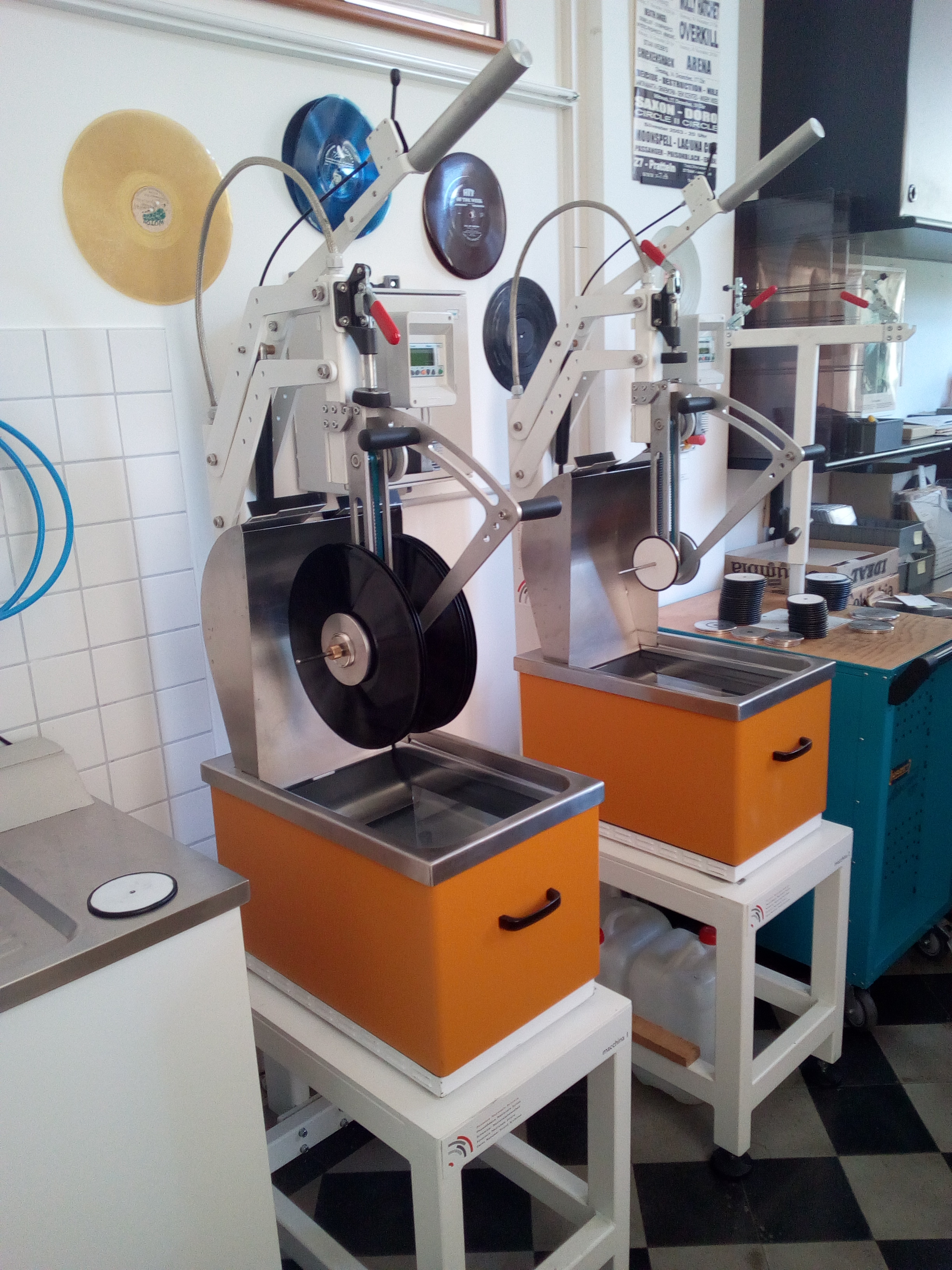
Device for the cleaning of vinyl records

The audio documents are digitized and catalogued in the FN-Base32 database developed by Revelation Software. The size of this database is over 40 terabytes.

On the website you can search this database for audio files and listen to them. Copying of the files is possible for private purposes against payment and on request also for professional purposes.

Another possibility is to visit one of the approximately 50 audiovisual stations located in Switzerland and Italy.

In addition to these access services, the Swiss National Sound Archives also offers archiving services such as restoration.

== Project ==
In the summer of 1999 the Swiss National Sound Archives started the project VisualAudio, developing the idea of recovery the sound from the picture of a record through optical scanning.

== Literature ==
- Kurt Deggeller, Projekt Tonträger, in: Methoden zur Erhaltung von Kulturgütern, published by F. Schweizer, V. Villiger, 1989, 225–230

== See also ==
- German Broadcasting Archive
