= Laser turntable =

Turntable that plays records using laser beams

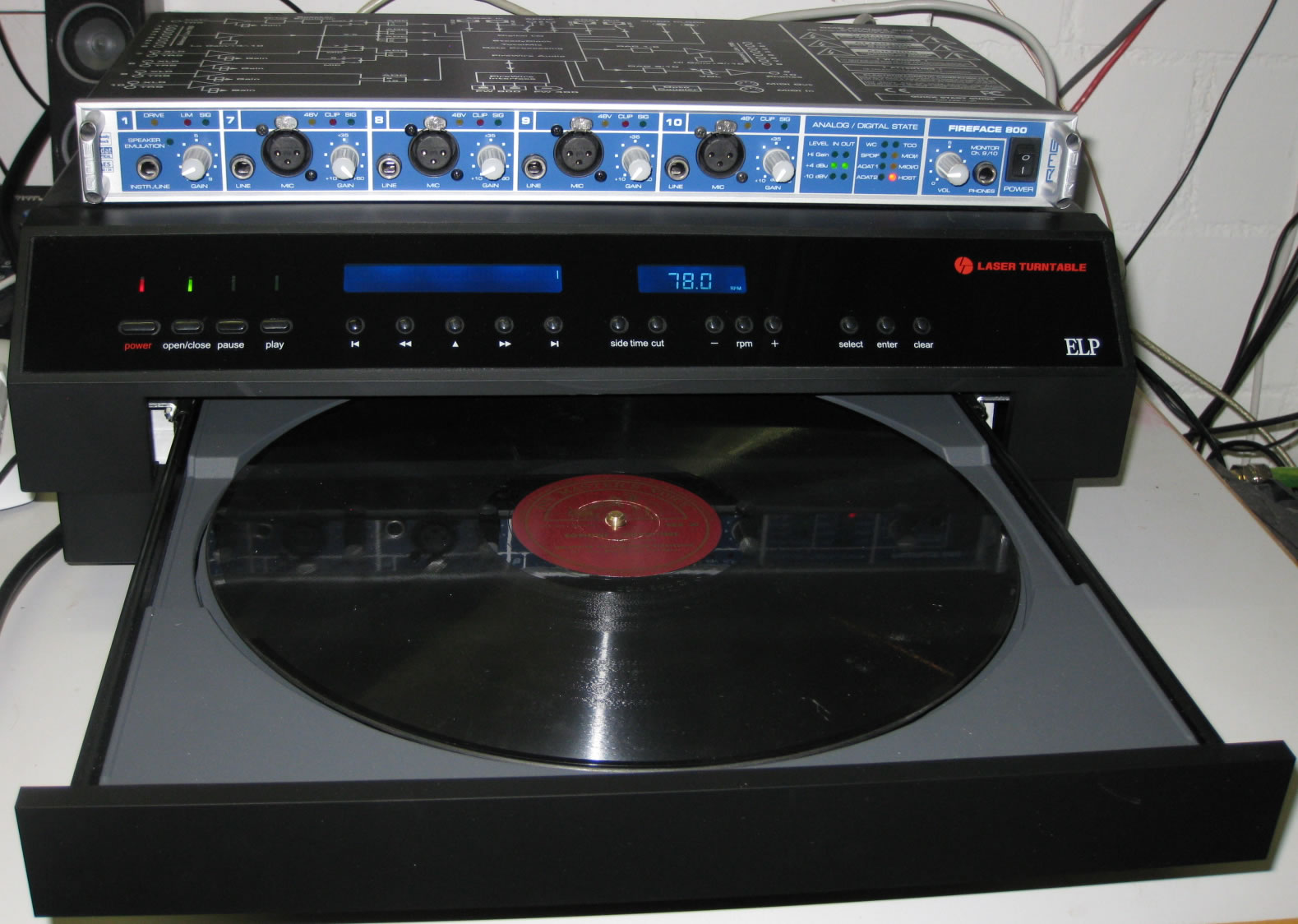
ELP Laser turntable (LT-2XA) and RME Fireface 800

A laser turntable (or optical turntable) is a phonograph that plays standard LP records (and other gramophone records) using laser beams as the pickup instead of using a stylus as in conventional turntables. Although these turntables use laser pickups, the same as Compact Disc players, the signal remains in the analog realm and is never digitized.

== History ==
William K. Heine presented a paper "A Laser Scanning Phonograph Record Player" to the 57th Audio Engineering Society (AES) convention in May 1977. The paper details a method developed by Heine that employs a single 2.2 mW helium–neon laser for both tracking a record groove and reproducing the stereo audio of a phonograph in real time. In development since 1972, the working prototype was named the "LASERPHONE", and the methods it used for playback was awarded U.S. Patent 3,992,593 on 16 November 1976. Heine concluded in his paper that he hoped his work would increase interest in using lasers for phonographic playback.

=== Finial ===
Four years later in 1981 Robert S. Reis, a graduate student in engineering at Stanford University, wrote his master's thesis on "An Optical Turntable". In 1983 he and fellow Stanford electrical engineer Robert E. Stoddard founded Finial Technology to develop and market a laser turntable, raising $7 million in venture capital. In 1984 servo-control expert Robert N. Stark joined the effort.

A non-functioning mock-up of the proposed Finial turntable was shown at the 1984 Consumer Electronics Show (CES), generating much interest and a fair amount of mystery, since the patents had not yet been granted and the details had to be kept secret. The first working model, the Finial LT-1 (Laser Turntable-1), was completed in time for the 1986 CES. The prototype revealed an interesting flaw of laser turntables: they are so accurate that they "play" every particle of dirt and dust on the record, instead of pushing them aside as a conventional stylus would. The non-contact laser pickup does have the advantages of eliminating record wear, tracking noise, turntable rumble and feedback from the speakers, but the sound is still that of an LP turntable rather than a Compact Disc. The projected $2,500 street price (later raised to $3,786 in 1988) limited the potential market to professionals (libraries, radio stations and archivists) and a few well-heeled audiophiles.

The Finial turntable never went into production. After Finial showed a few hand-built (and finicky) prototypes, tooling delays, component unavailability (in the days before cheap lasers), marketing blunders, and high development costs kept pushing back the release date. The long development of the laser turntable exactly coincided with two major events, the early 1980s recession, and the introduction of the Digital Compact Disc, which soon began flooding the market at prices comparable to LPs (with CD players in the $300 range). Vinyl record sales plummeted, and many established turntable manufacturers went out of business as a result.

With over US$20 million in venture capital invested, Finial faced a marketing dilemma: forge ahead with a selling price that would be too high for most consumers, or gamble on going into mass production at a much lower price and hope the market would lower costs. Neither seemed viable in a rapidly-shrinking market.

=== ELP ===
Finally, in late 1989 after almost seven years of research, Finial's investors cut their losses and liquidated the firm, selling the patents to Japanese turntable maker CTI Japan, which in turn created ELP Japan for continued development of the "super-audiophile" turntable. After eight more years of development the laser turntable was finally put on sale in 1997 – twenty years after the initial proposal – as the ELP LT-1XA Laser Turntable, with a list price of US$20,500 (in 2003 the price was lowered to US$10,500). The turntable, which uses two lasers to read the groove and three more to position the head, does allow one to vary the depth at which the groove is read, possibly bypassing existing record wear. It will not, however, read clear or colored vinyl records. ELP sells built-to-order laser turntables directly to consumers in two versions (LT-basic, and LT-master), at a reported cost (unpublished) of approximately $16,000 for the basic model.

=== Optora ===
In May 2018, Almedio of Japan, a computer drive manufacturer, presented the Optora ORP-1 optical (laser) turntable at the HIGH END Munich audio show. Few details were provided by the company because, like the 1984 presentation of the Finial turntable, the Optora was a non-working mockup. Company representatives indicated the turntable would use five lasers and be belt-driven, like the ELP. However, after producing some promotional materials (since deleted), a price was never announced and the Optora has not been put on the market. The company's website devoted to the turntable has since been deleted.

== Performance ==
In a 2008 review of the model ELP LT-1LRC, Jonathan Valin in The Absolute Sound described its presentation as "pleasant but dull".

Valin commended the tonal accuracy of playback, but criticized the lack of dynamic range and bass response (limitations of the vinyl records themselves). He emphasized that records must be wet-cleaned immediately before playback because:

Unlike a relatively massive diamond stylus, which plows through a record’s grooves like the prow of a ship, the ELP’s tiny laser-beam styli have next to no mass and cannot move dust particles out of their way. Any speck of dirt, however minute, is read by the lasers along with the music.

In 2008, Michael Fremer noted in Stereophile:

...consider the LT's many pluses: no rumble or background noise of any kind; no cartridge-induced resonances or frequency-response anomalies; no compromise in channel separation (the ELP guarantees channel separation in excess of what the best cutter heads offer); zero tracking or tracing error; no inner-groove distortion; no skating; no adjustments of VTA or azimuth to worry about; no tangency error (like the cutter head itself, the laser pickup is a linear tracker); no record wear; a claimed frequency response of 10Hz–25kHz; and, because the laser beam is less than a quarter the contact area of the smallest elliptical stylus, it can negotiate sections of the engraved waveform that even the smallest stylus misses.

Fremer also noted, however, that all of this comes at a cost:

[T]he LT-2XRC's laser pickup was unable to distinguish groove modulations from dirt. Records that sound dead quiet on a conventional turntable could sound as if I was munching potato chips while listening to the ELP. Bummer. There's a solution, of course: a record-cleaning machine. This can't be considered an 'accessory' with the LT: it's mandatory. Even new records fresh out of the jacket can sound crunchy.

Fremer concludes:

Ironically, if you listen to the music itself, you won't know you're listening to an LP. It's almost like a reel-to-reel tape. Unfortunately, when there is noise, it will always make you aware that you're listening to an LP. That's the confounding thing about this fabulous contraption.

== Optical record scanning ==
A similar technology is to scan or photograph the grooves of the record, and then reconstruct the sound from the modulation of the groove revealed by the image. Research groups that developed this technology include:

- IRENE (for Image, Reconstruct, Erase Noise, Etc.) developed by physicists Carl Haber and Vitaliy Fadeyev of the Lawrence Berkeley National Laboratory. Installed in the Library of Congress late in 2006, IRENE uses a camera rotating around the record and taking detailed photographs of the grooves. Software then uses the digital images to reconstruct the sound. In 2018 the system was used to play, for the first time, the only known recording of Alexander Graham Bell's voice. IRENE often produces a large amount of hiss with the recording, but it is very capable of removing pops and clicks produced by imperfections on the record surface.
- SAPHIR system developed at INA in 2002 (patented in France in 2004).
- VisualAudio developed by the Swiss National Sound Archives and the School of Engineering and Architecture of Fribourg.
- A laser beam reflection method was developed by Japanese scientists in Hokkaido university in 1986 for the purpose of reading audio recordings of the Ainu language made on fragile wax cylinders.

== See also ==
- LaserDisc

== Bibliography ==
- Uozumi, Jun, and Toshimitsu Asakura. "Reproduction of sound from old disks by the laser diffraction method." Applied optics 27.13 (1988): 2671-2676.
- Nakamura, Takashi, et al. "Optical reproduction of sounds from old phonographic wax cylinders." Proceedings of SPIE. Vol. 3190. 1997.
- Uozumi, Jun, and T. Asakura. "Optical methods for reproducing sounds from old phonograph records." International Trends in Optics and Photonics: ICO IV (1999): 409-425.
- Uozumi, Jun, Tsuyoshi Ushizaka, and Toshimitsu Asakura. "Optical reproduction of sounds from negative phonograph cylinders." Optics and Lasers in Biomedicine and Culture: Contributions to the Fifth International Conference on Optics Within Life Sciences OWLS V Crete, 13–16 October 1998. Springer Berlin Heidelberg, 2000.
- Asakura, Toshimitsu, et al. "Study on reproduction of sound from old wax phonograph cylinders using the laser." Optics and Lasers in Biomedicine and Culture: Contributions to the Fifth International Conference on Optics Within Life Sciences OWLS V Crete, 13–16 October 1998. Springer Berlin Heidelberg, 2000.
- ASAKURA, Toshimitsu. "Research and reconstruction of art and acoustic cultural heritage by means of optical methods." JSAP international 6 (2002): 12-19.
- Fadeyev, Vitaliy, and Carl Haber. "Reconstruction of mechanically recorded sound by image processing." Journal of the Audio Engineering Society 51.12 (2003): 1172-1185.
- Stotzer, Sylvain, et al. "Visualaudio: an optical technique to save the sound of phonographic records." IASA Journal (2003): 38-47.
- Penn, William A., and Martha J. Hanson. "The Syracuse University Library Radius Project: Development of a non-destructive playback system for cylinder recordings." First Monday 8.5-5 (2003).
- McCann, M., P. Calamia, and N. Ailon. "Audio Extraction from Optical Scans of Records." (2004).
- Lutz, Noé, and Michel Yerly. "Studies of Mechanical Recording Media with 3D Surface Profiling Methods: Data Collection and Analysis." Berkeley, LBNL, October (2005).
- Stotzer, Sylvain. Phonographic record sound extraction by image processing. Diss. Université de Fribourg, 2006.
- Tian, Baozhong, and John L. Barron. "Reproduction of sound signal from gramophone records using 3d scene reconstruction." Irish Machine Vision and Image Processing Conference. 2006.
- Li, Beinan, Simon de Leon, and Ichiro Fujinaga. "Alternative Digitization Approach for Stereo Phonograph Records Using Optical Audio Reconstruction." ISMIR. 2007.
- Cornell, Earl W., et al. "Using optical metrology to reconstruct sound recordings." Nuclear Instruments and Methods in Physics Research Section A: Accelerators, Spectrometers, Detectors and Associated Equipment 579.2 (2007): 901-904.
- Aleksandrović, Vesna. "Analog/digital sound. National Library of Serbia digital collection of 78 rpm gramophone records." Review of National Center for Digitization 12 (2008): 37-42.
- Boltryk, P. J., et al. "Noncontact surface metrology for preservation and sound recovery from mechanical sound recordings." Journal of the Audio Engineering Society 56.7/8 (2008): 545-559.
- Li, Beinan, Jordan BL Smith, and Ichiro Fujinaga. "Optical Audio Reconstruction for Stereo Phonograph Records Using White Light Interferometry." ISMIR. 2009.
- Canazza, Sergio, and Antonina Dattolo. "Listening the photos." Proceedings of the 2010 ACM Symposium on Applied Computing. 2010.
- Tian, Baozhong, Samuel Sambasivam, and John Barron. "Practical digital playback of gramophone records using flat-bed scanner images." Audio Engineering Society Convention 131. Audio Engineering Society, 2011.
- Hayes, James. "Lasers get groovy." Engineering & Technology 6.11 (2011): 58-59.
- Janukiewicz, Kristofer. "A Laser Triangulation Approach for Optical Audio Reconstruction of Phonograph Records." (2016).
- Chenot, Jean-Hugues, Louis Laborelli, and Jean-Étienne Noiré. "Saphir: optical playback of damaged and delaminated analogue audio disc records." Journal on Computing and Cultural Heritage 11.3 (2018): 14-1.
- Chenot, Jean-Hugues, Louis Laborelli, and Jean-Etienne Noiré. "Saphir: Digitizing broken and cracked or delaminated lacquer 78 rpm records using a desktop optical scanner."
- Hawkins, Julia, and Bryce Roe. "IRENE audio preservation at the Northeast Document Conservation Center: Developing workflows and standards for preservation projects that use innovative technology." Journal of Digital Media Management 9.3 (2021): 262-278.
- Chenot, Jean-Hugues, and Jean-Etienne Noiré. "Challenges in Optical Recovery of Otherwise Unplayable Analogue Audio Disc Records." Audio Engineering Society Conference: AES 2023 International Conference on Audio Archiving, Preservation & Restoration. Audio Engineering Society, 2023.
- Using Optical Metrology to Restore Sound Recordings
- Using Physics to Restore Early Sound Recordings
- Reconstruct Sound Recordings
