= ELP Japan =

Japanese audio equipment manufacturer

Edison Laser Player (ELP) Japan is a Japanese audio equipment company started by Sanju Chiba, who manufacture laser turntables.

The origin of ELP's turntable came from an American company named Finial Technologies, led by Michael Stoddard, who designed a prototype unit for playing vinyl using laser technology in the mid-1980s. Unfortunately, this coincided with the commercial rise of the CD, so Finial went into receivership and sold the rights to ELP in 1989.

The units are custom built to order - a typical price in the mid-2000s was about $11,000 to $15,000. The turntable uses a combination of five lasers, which point in different directions of the groove in a vinyl record to ensure a steady signal is picked up. Because of laser technology, loading and unloading a vinyl record is similar to the process used in most high end CD players.

The lack of mechanical components means it is far more capable of playing records, even those with scratches and warps, and it also allows direct track selection like a CD, along with the ability to change pitch in smaller increments, which is physically impossible using CD technology.

One notable disadvantage of the laser technology used is that it will not play clear or colored vinyl, which was sometimes used for novelty singles and promotional material. Another is that while the technology allows for superior sound pickup, it also “reads” all dust and dirt in the grooves rather than pushing it aside, so clicks and pops can become much more pronounced. A thorough and frequent cleaning of the vinyl is therefore required.
