= Cylcon =

Ancient Australian Aboriginal artifact

Cylcons are among the earliest artefacts of the Aboriginal Australians. A cylcon is a cylindrical stone tapering at one end and marked with incisions. The name is a shortening of the descriptive term "cylindro-conical stone".

Matthew Flinders saw two cylcons in 1802 and wrote a description. Archaeologists have sometimes assigned cylcons an original ritual, magical, or religious function that over time was displaced by a more utilitarian one, that of a pestle for use in food production.

It is impossible to date most cylcons, but the very heavy weathering of most attests to their great age. The earliest yet found in a dateable archaeological context is about 20,000 years old. They belong, with the earliest Aboriginal rock art, to the Early Stone Age. They are earlier than tjurungas. If they were used to communicate messages, as generally thought, they are the oldest form of recorded communication. Some are even thought to contain maps, which would be the oldest maps in existence.
