= List of Francisco Goya's tapestry cartoons =

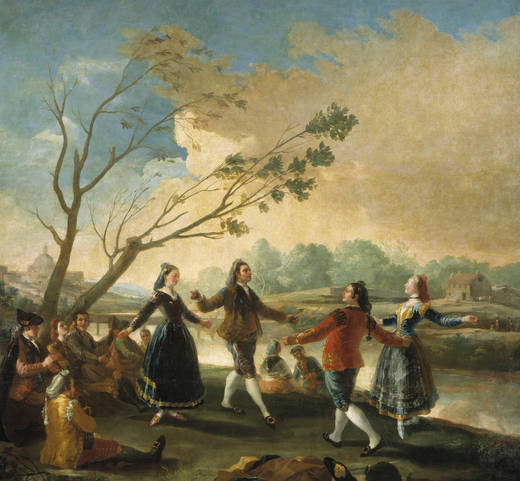
El baile de San Antonio de la Florida, 1791–1792

This is a complete list of Francisco Goya's 63 large cartoons for tapestries (Spanish: cartones para tapices) painted on commission for Charles III of Spain and later Charles IV of Spain between 1775 and 1791 to hang in the San Lorenzo de El Escorial and El Pardo palaces. The word "cartoon" is derived from the Italian cartone, which describes a large sheet of paper used in preparation for a later painting or tapestry. Goya's were executed on canvas which was then woven into wool tapestry to a large mural scale. While many of the large finished works are today in the Prado Museum, the original sketches were sold as works in their own right.

In 1774, Goya was asked by the German artist Anton Raphael Mengs, acting on behalf of the Spanish crown, to undertake the series. While designing tapestries was neither prestigious nor well paid, Goya used them, along with his early engravings, to bring himself to wider attention. They afforded his first contact with the Spanish monarchy that was to eventually appoint him court painter. The works are mostly popularist in a rococo style, and were completed early in his career, when he was largely unknown and actively seeking commissions. There is evidence that he later regretted having spent so much effort and time on the pieces, and that his later darker period, which begins roughly with Yard with Lunatics, was in part a reaction against them.

By 1776, aged 29, he had completed five tapestries, by the Real Fábrica de Tapices de Santa Bárbara, the royal tapestry manufactory. His brother-in-law Francisco Bayeu was made director of the tapestry works in 1777, which greatly advanced the ambitious artist's career prospects. However, Goya was beset by illness during the period, and his condition was used against him by the contemporary art scene, which looked jealously upon any artist seen to be rising in stature. Some of the larger cartoons, such as The Wedding, were more than 8 by 10 feet, and had proved a drain on his physical strength. Ever resourceful, Goya turned this misfortune around, claiming that his illness had allowed him the insight to produce works that were more personal and informal. However, he found the format limiting, because being inherently matte, tapestry was unable to capture complex colour shift or texture, and was unsuited to the impasto and glazing techniques he was by then applying to his painted works.

Dating the series has not been difficult as the Royal Tapestry Works maintained a detailed record of the dates, titles, sizes and states in which each of the cartoons arrived. Goya's letters to his friends (in particular his correspondence with the Aragonese industrialist Martín Zapater) contain additional details.

== Groupings ==
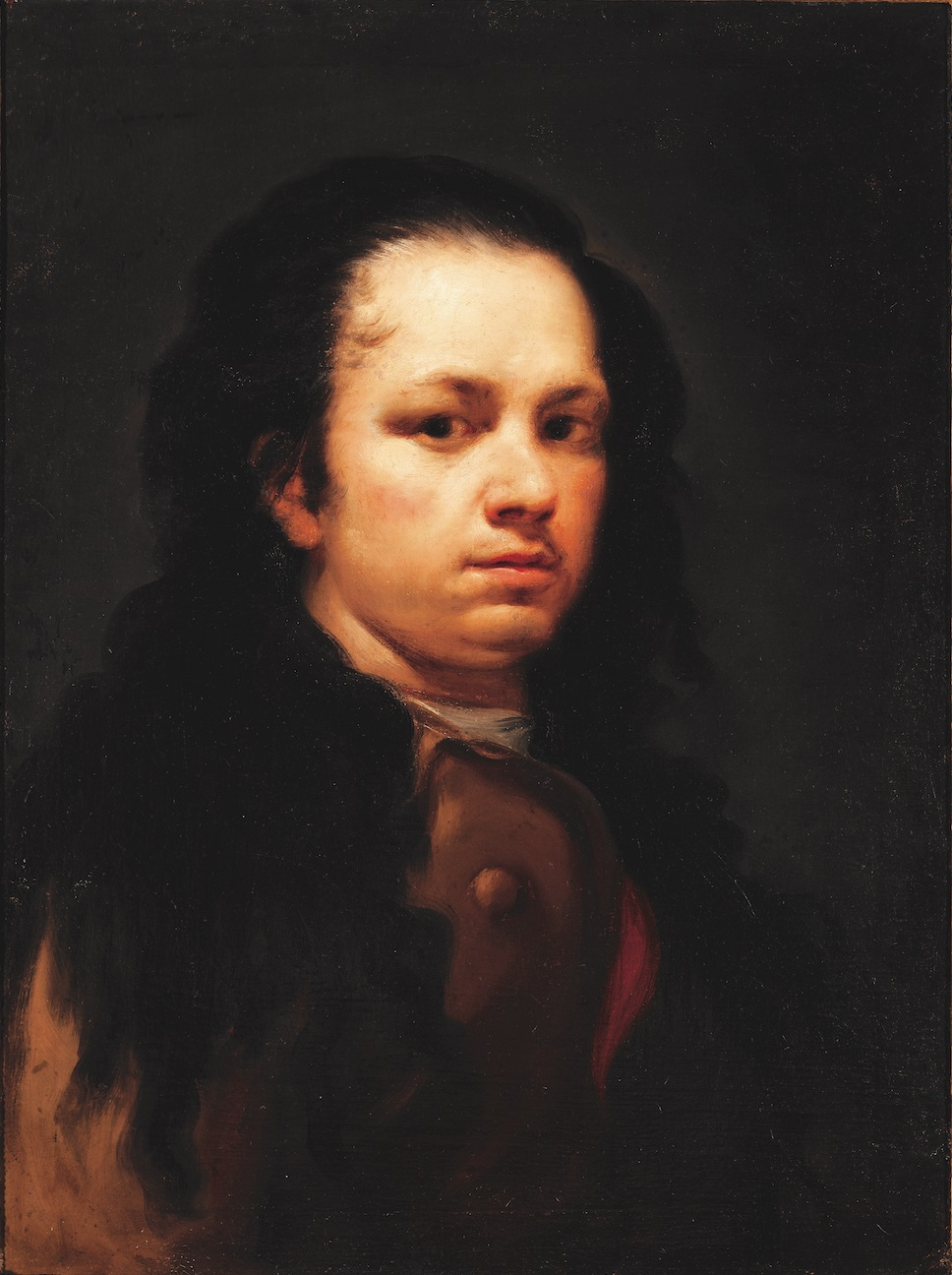
Self-portrait by Goya (1771-1775), shortly before beginning the first series of cartoons. 58 × 44 cm. Collection of Marquesa de Zurgena, Madrid

The series can be divided into a number of groups based on intended location or theme. Art historians Valeriano Bozal and Nigel Glendinning arrange the series in four groups, whereas Janis Tomlinson places them in seven. The Goya catalogue of the Museo del Prado is closer to Tomlinson than to Bozal or Glendinning, but attempts to reconcile the two positions by grouping the cartoons into five sequences.

Goya had at first wanted to paint French or Dutch pastoral scenes, however Charles IV preferred "entertainments and clothing of the present time". This afforded Goya the opportunity to study closely his fellow citizens going about their daily lives, and allowed him to work outside of ecclesiastical commissions, which he often found dull and uninspiring. In general the cartoons are playful and depict the leisure activities of a variety of ages and social classes. Nine are hunting scenes that were for the dining room at the Escorial, which pleased the king's son—the future Charles IV—who was an avid hunter. A further ten were created for the dining room at El Pardo. The prince's wife, Maria Luisa, enjoyed the scenes of dancing and singing. The works are painted in the then-fashionable Rococo style, and heavily influenced by Antoine Watteau, whose work Goya came to know through his studies of Titian.

== First series (1775) ==
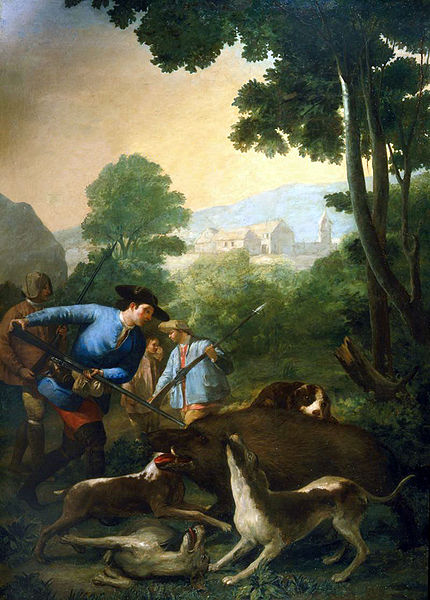
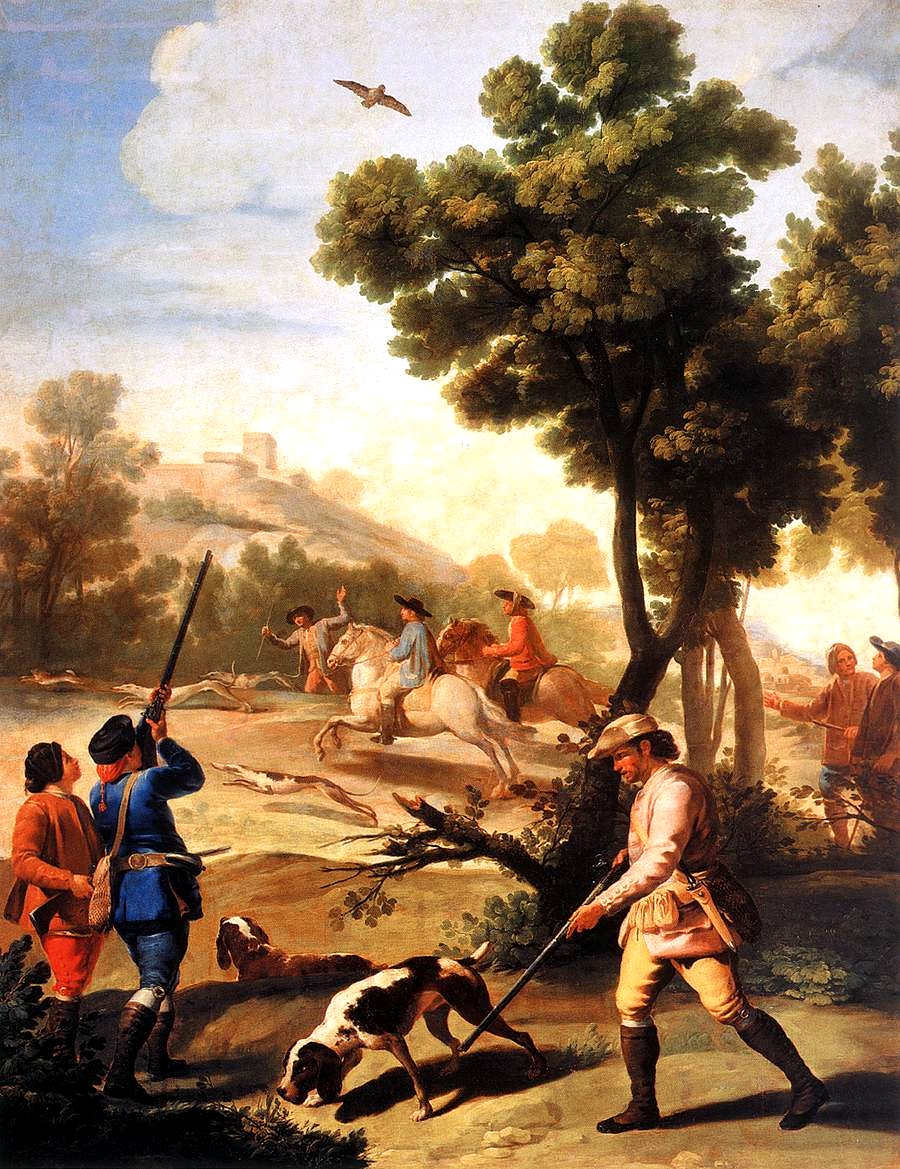
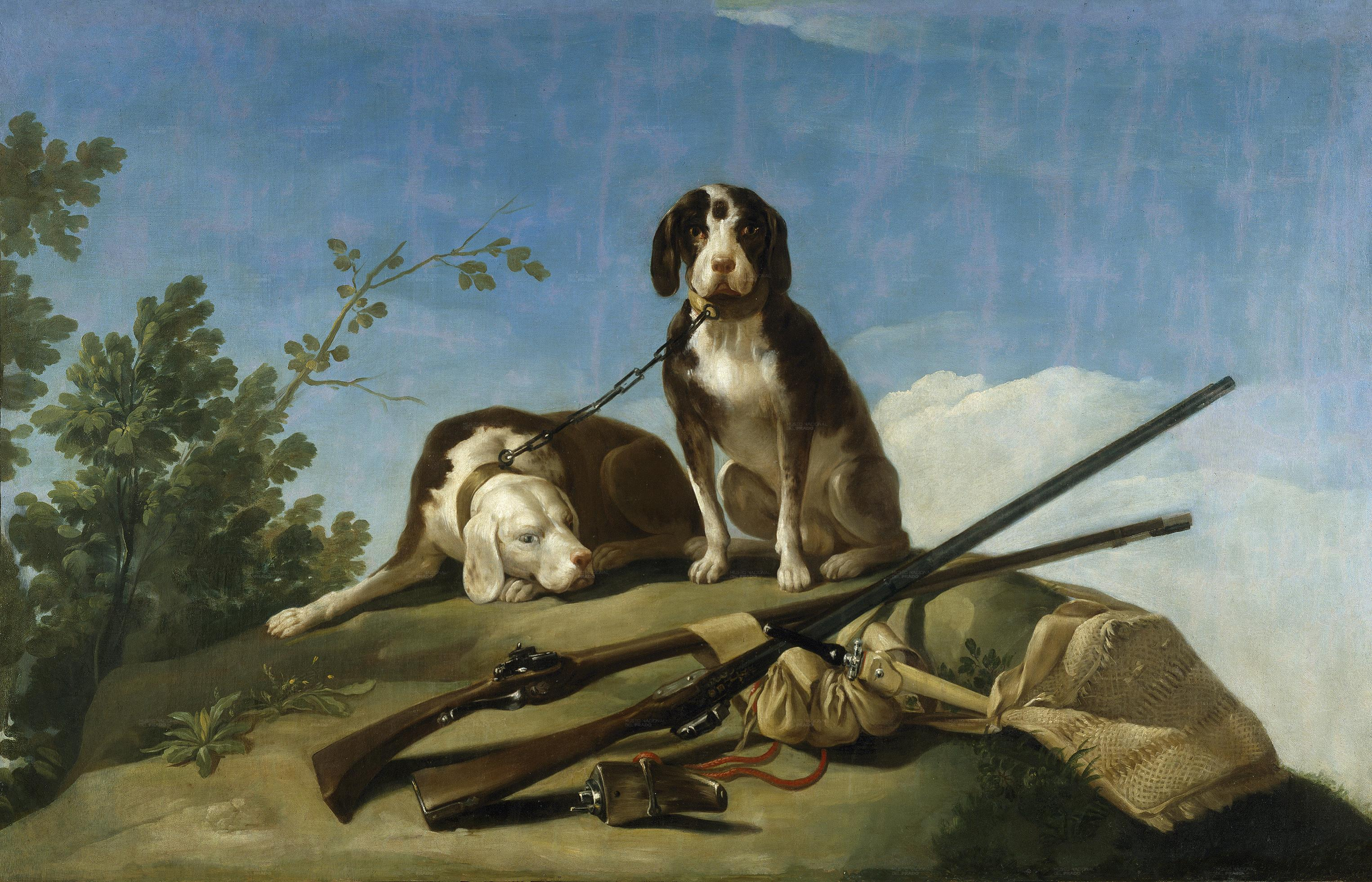
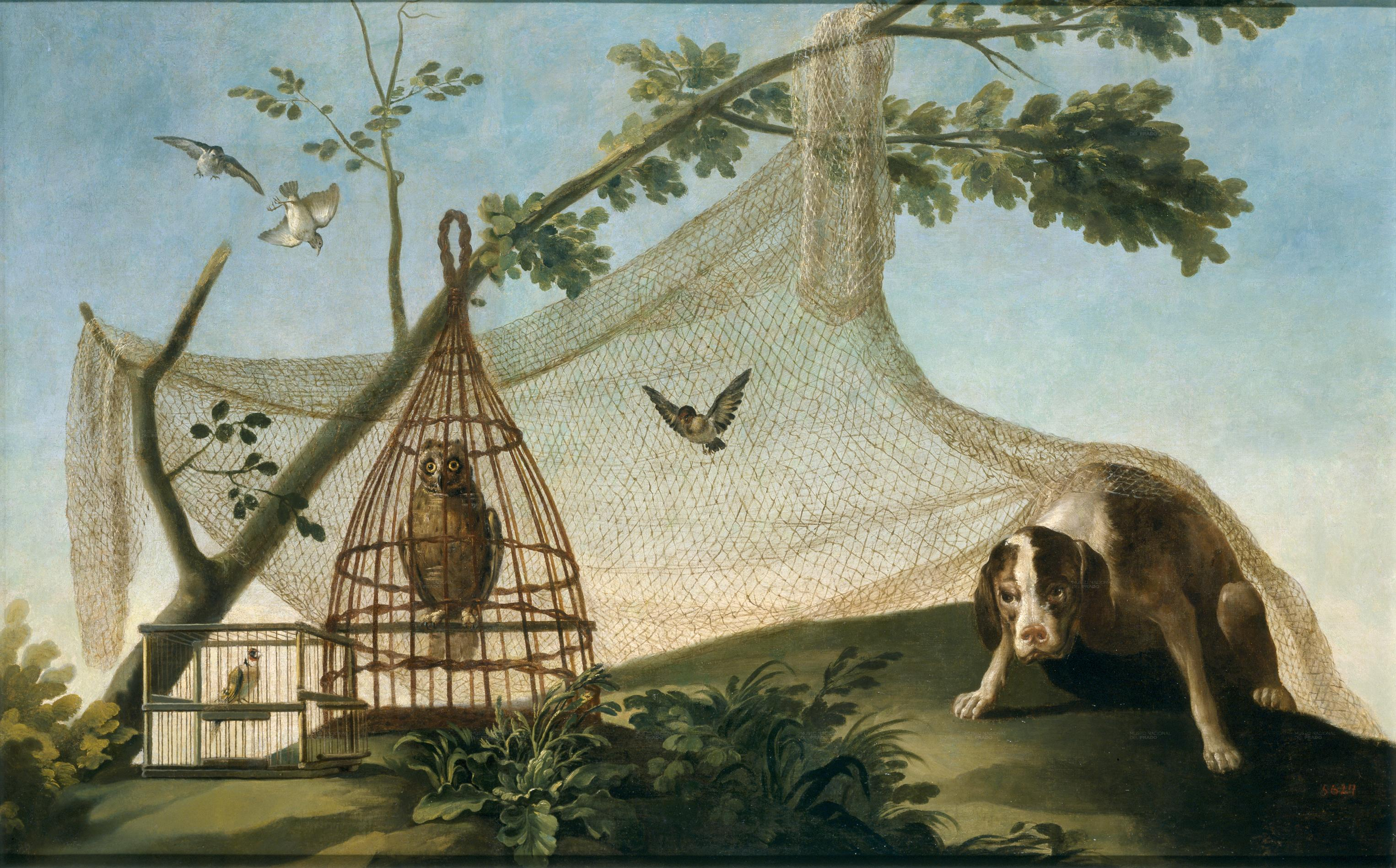
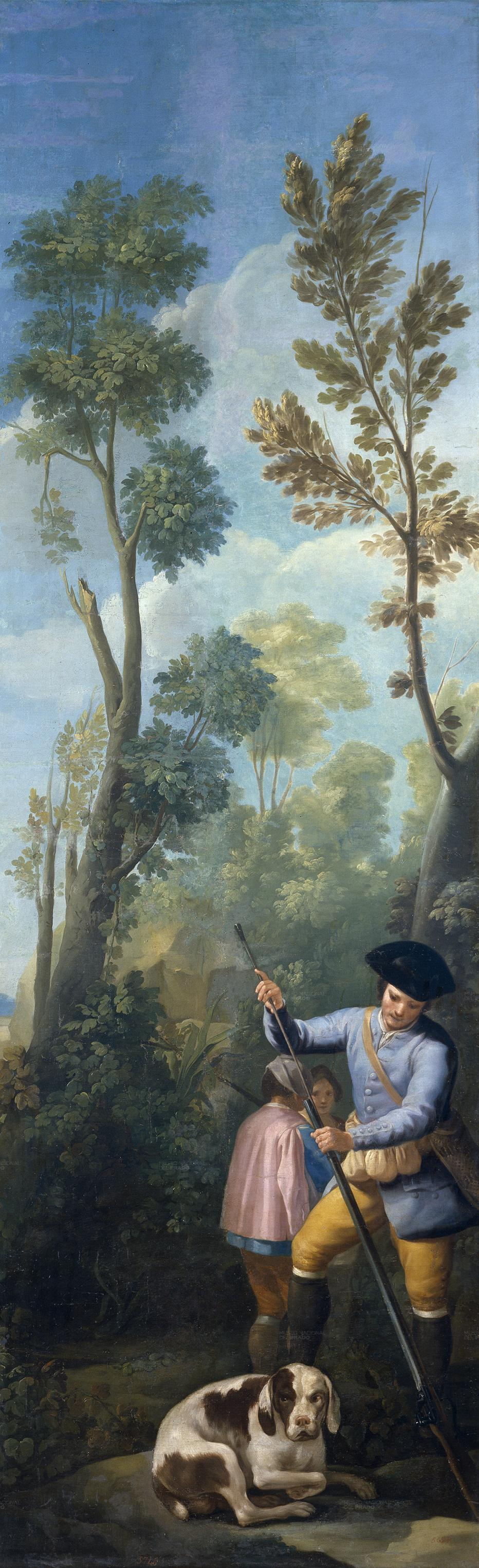
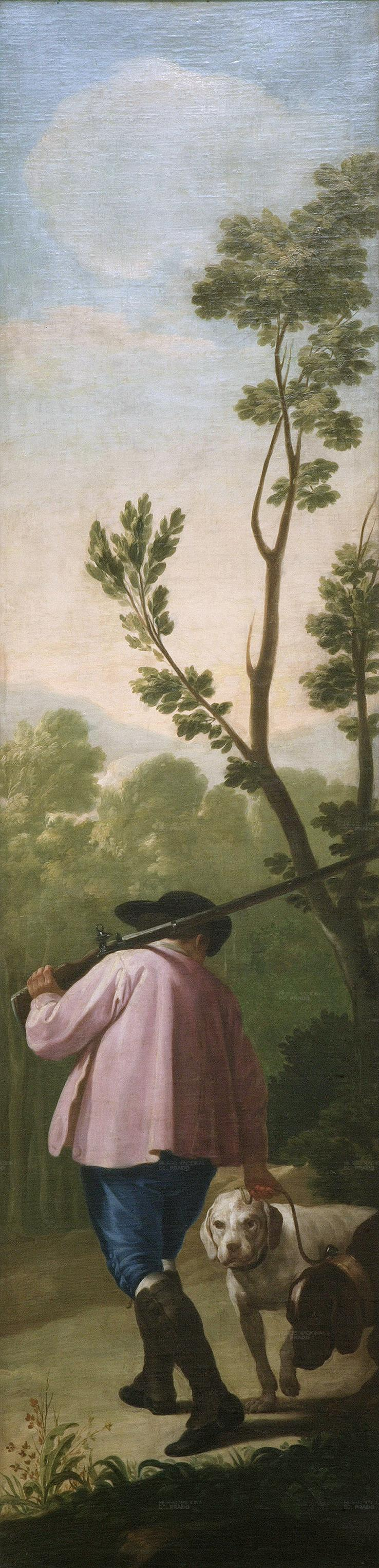
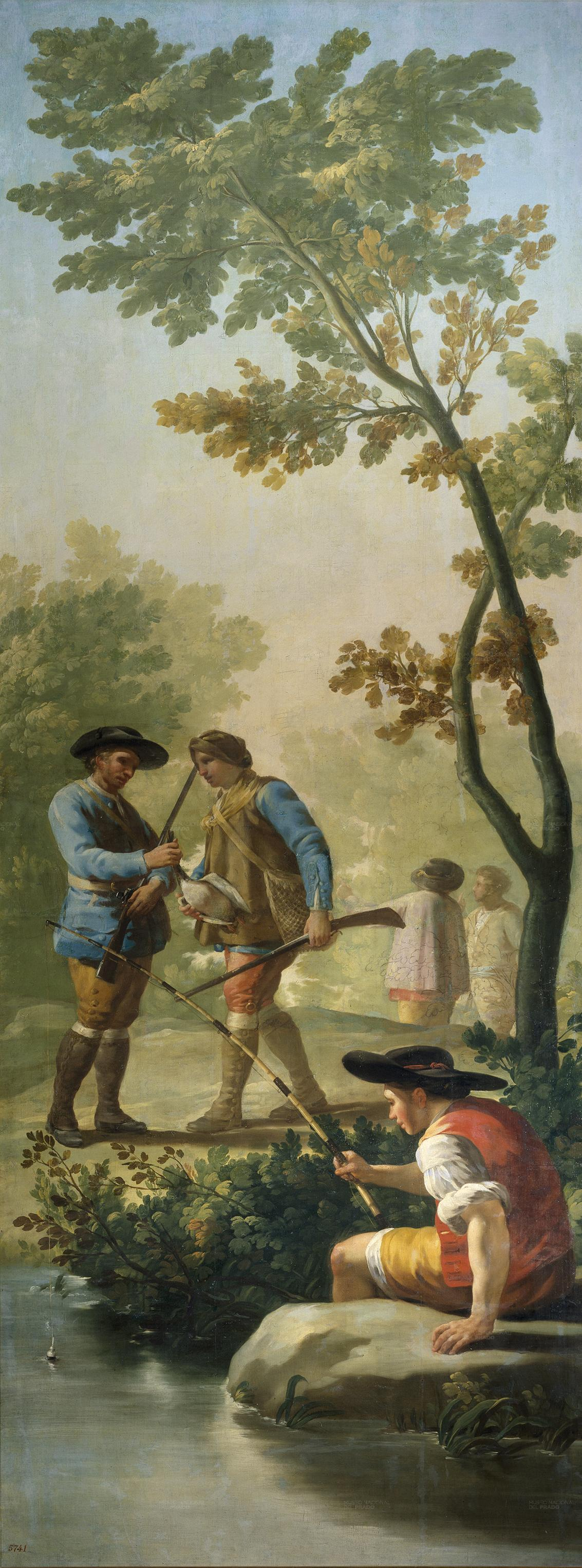
Tapestry	Spanish title	Date	Dimensions	Museum
	La caza del jabalí	1775	249 × 173 cm	Palacio Real (Madrid)
	La caza de la codorniz o Partida de caza	1775	290 × 226 cm	Museo del Prado (Madrid)
	Perros y útiles de caza	1775	112 × 174 cm	Museo del Prado
	Caza con reclamo	1775	112 × 179 cm	Museo del Prado
	Cazador cargando su escopeta	1775	289 × 90 cm	Museo del Prado
	El cazador con sus perros	1775	262 × 71 cm	Museo del Prado
	El pescador de caña	1775	290 × 226 cm	Museo del Prado

== Second series (1776–1778) ==
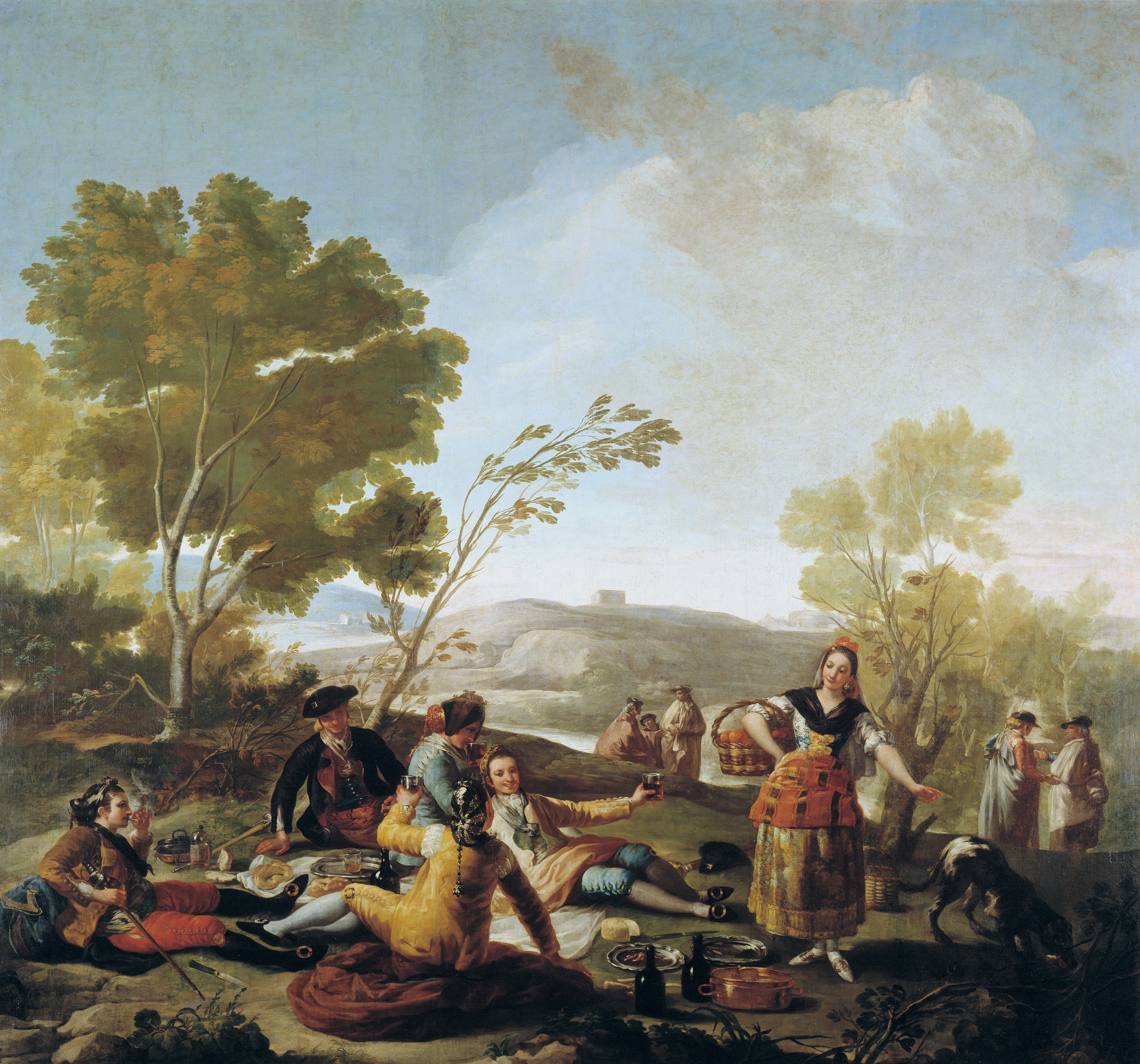
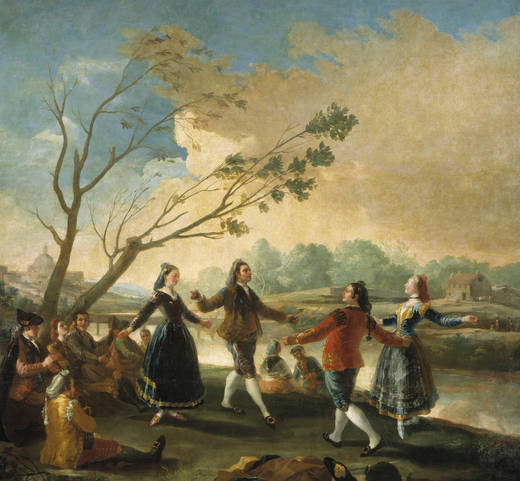
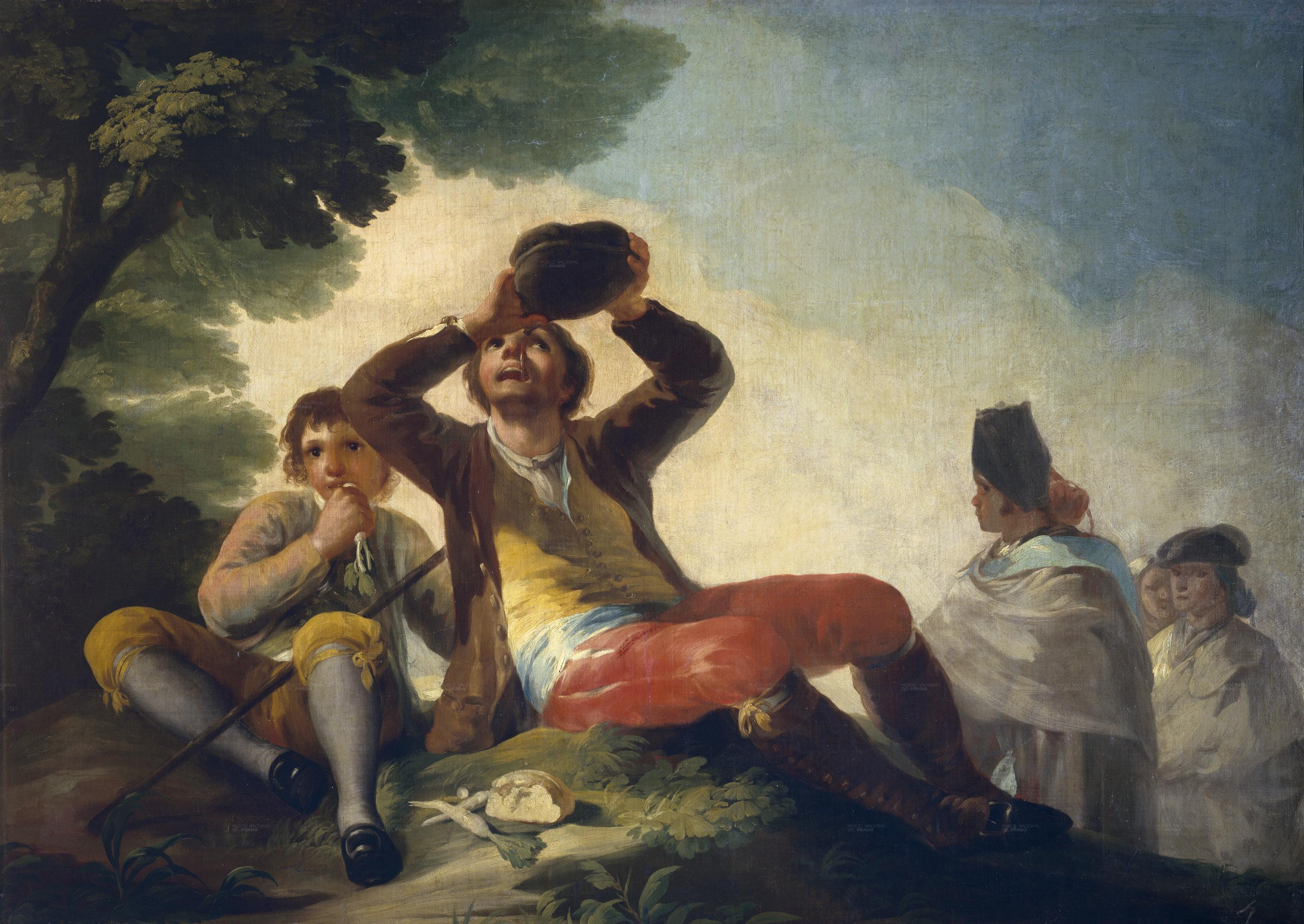
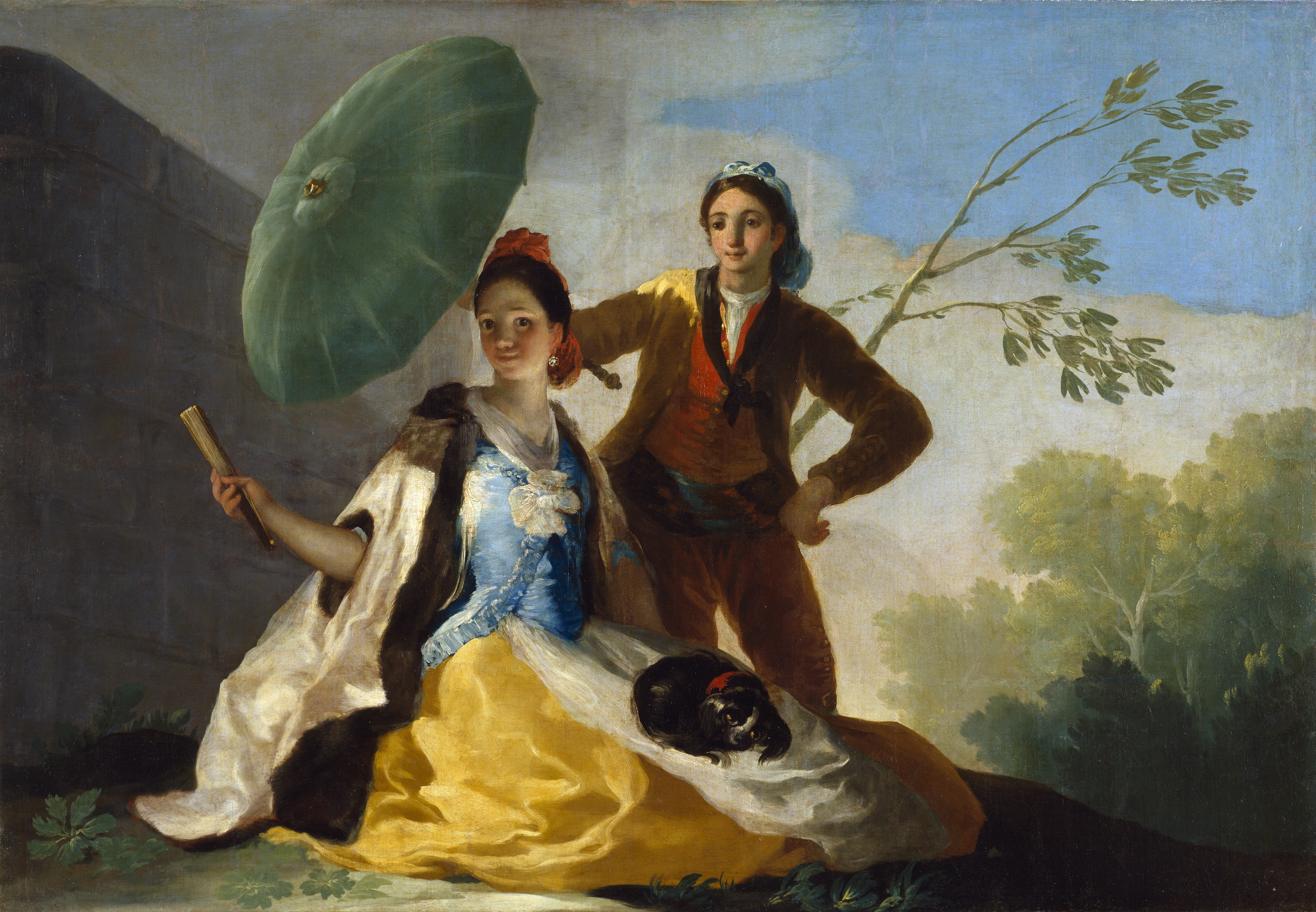
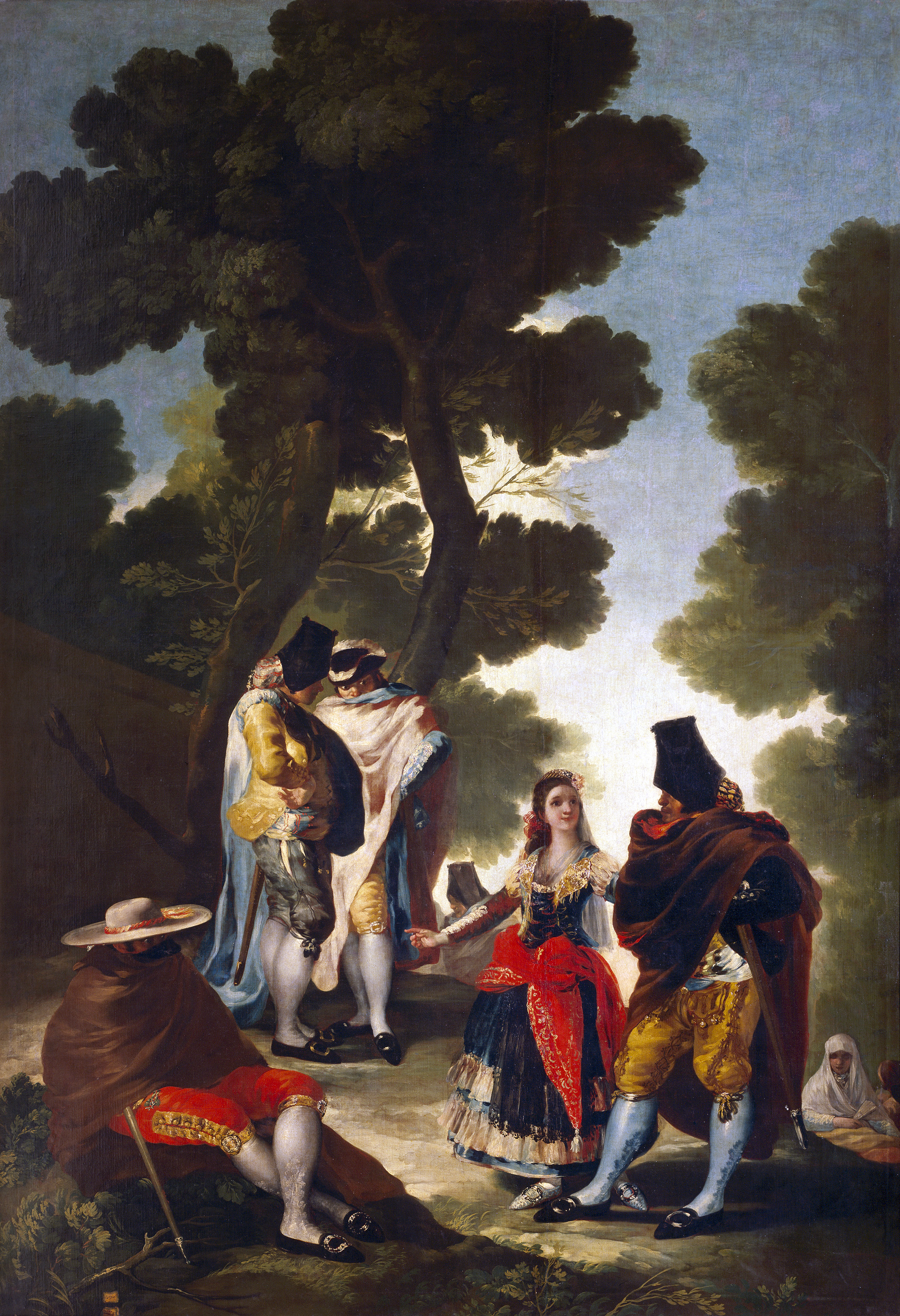
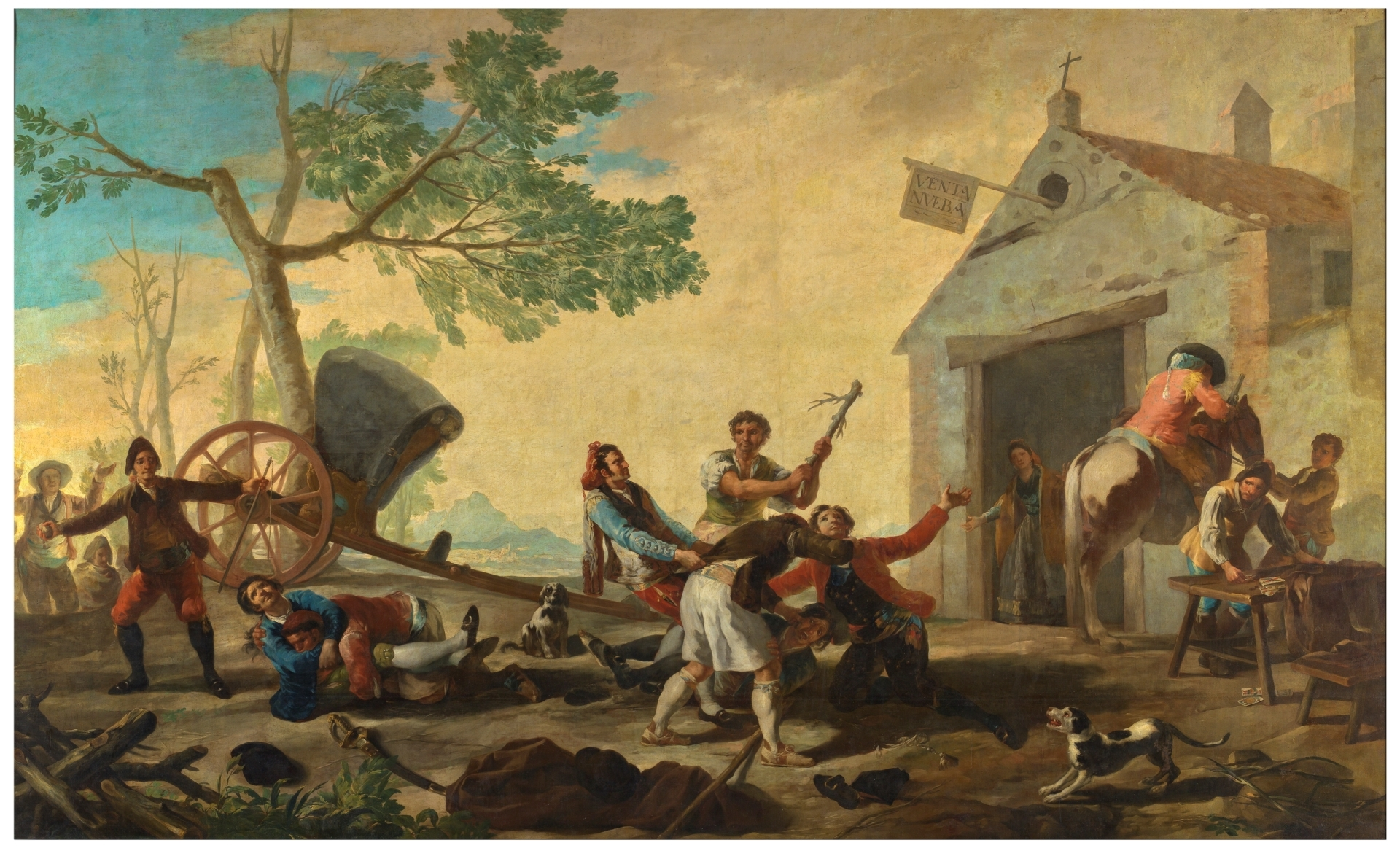
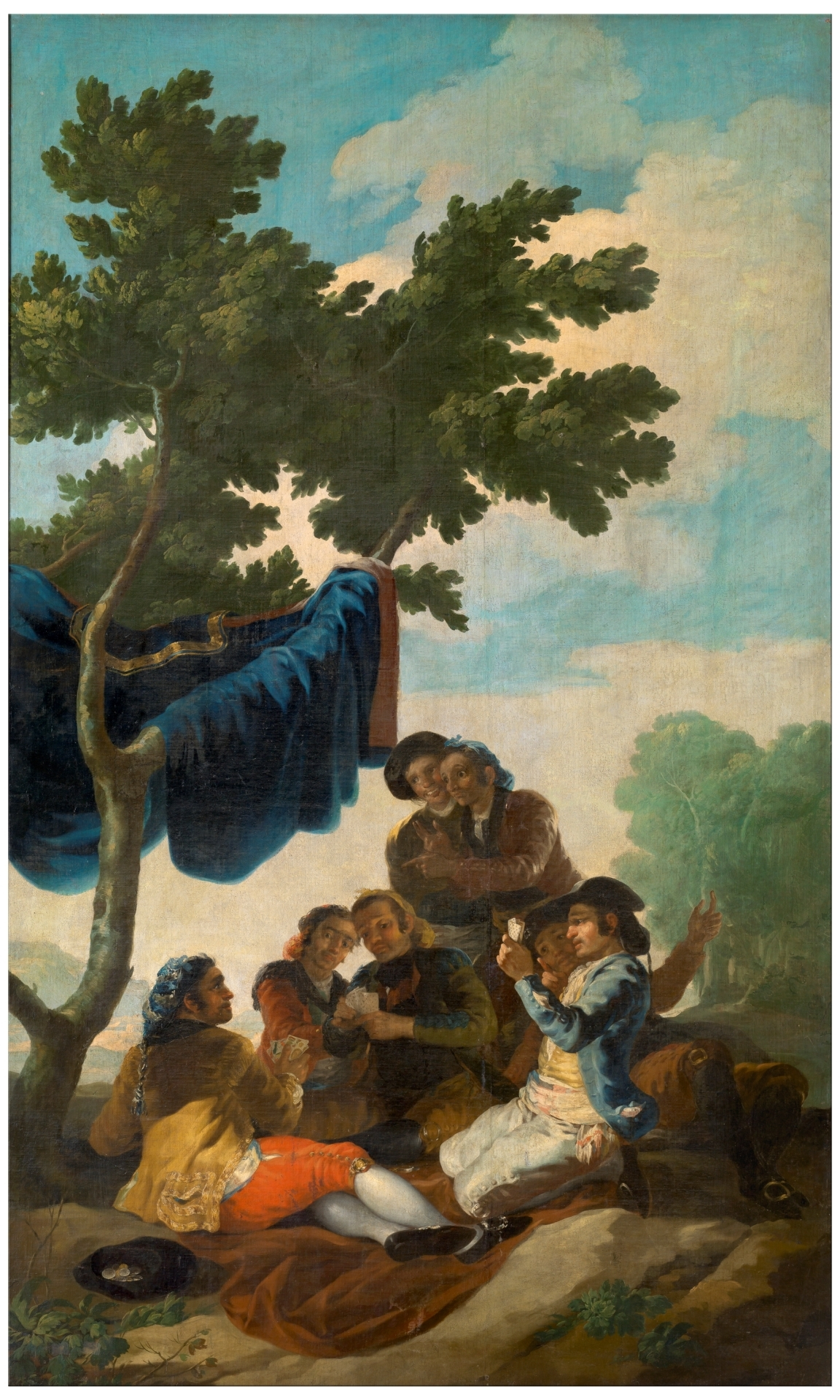
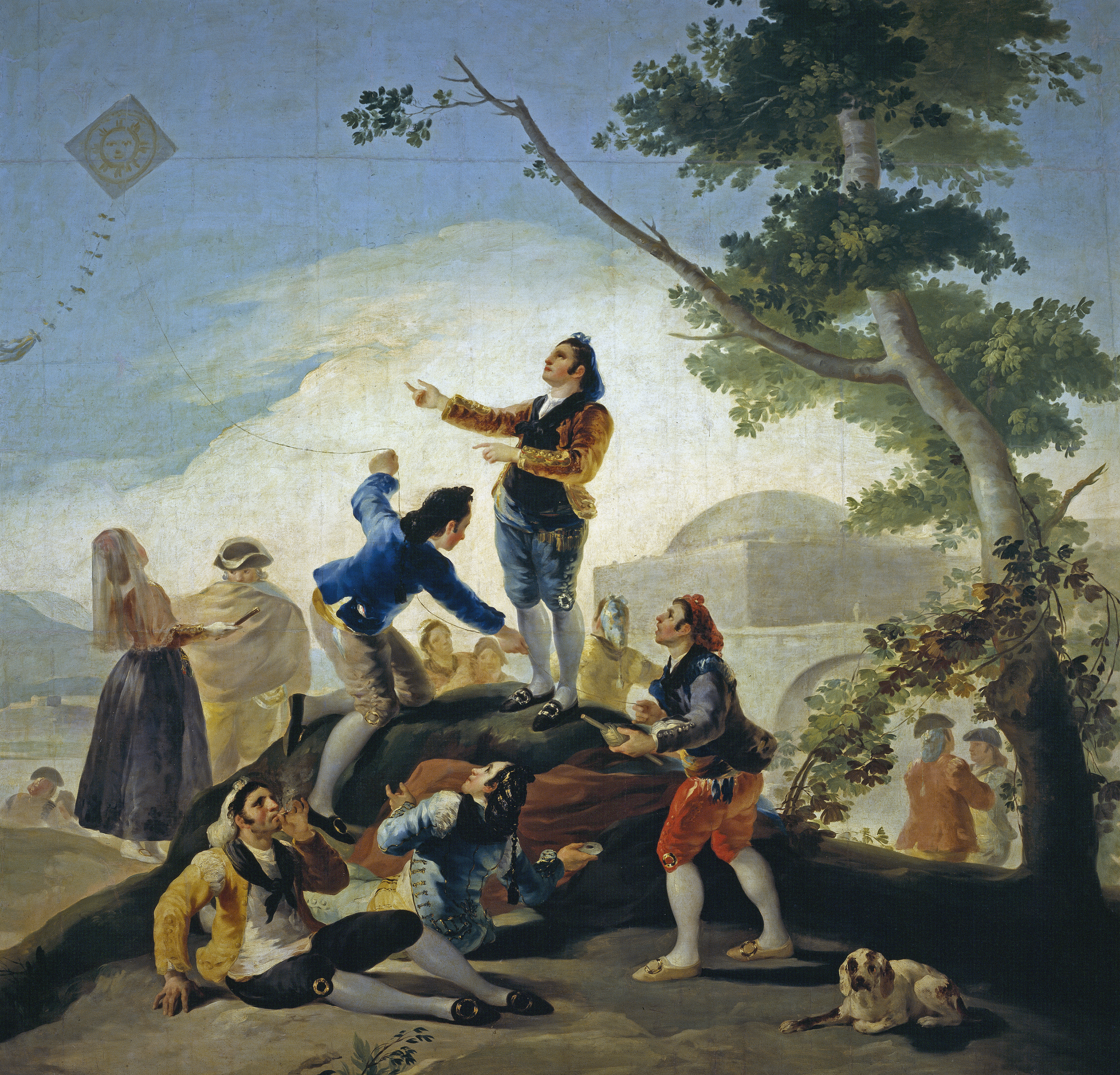
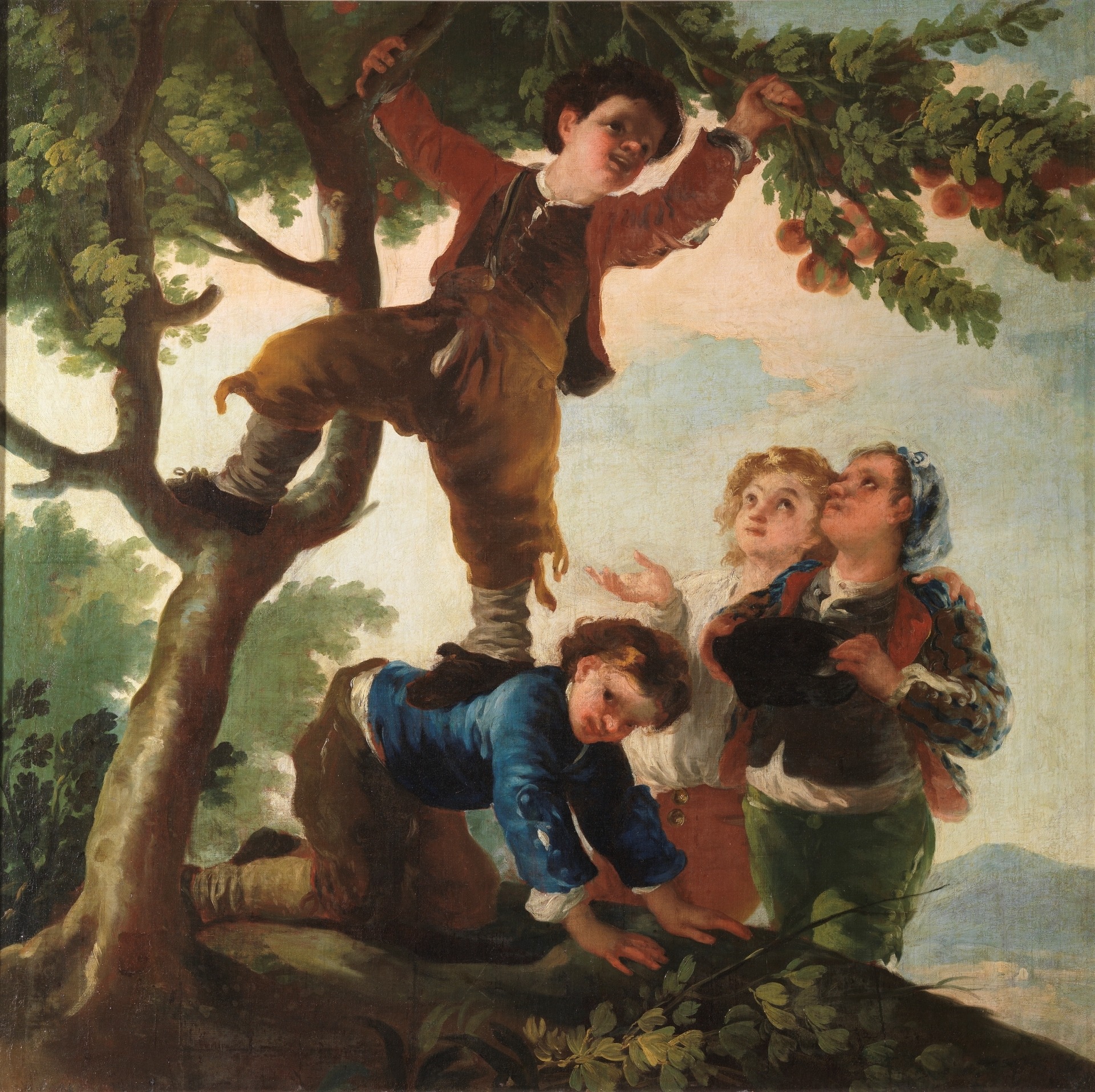
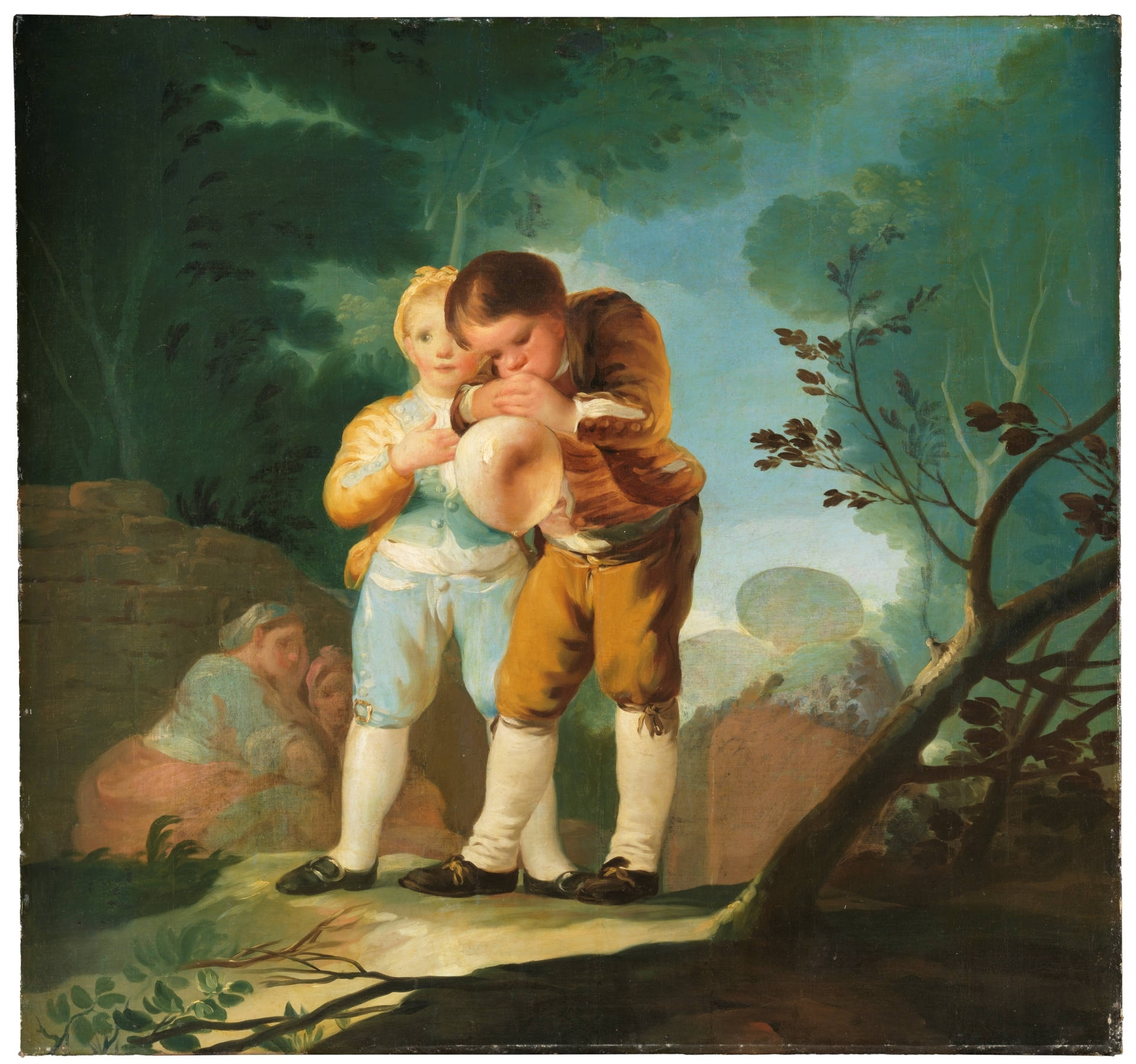
Tapestry	Spanish title	Date	Dimensions	Museum
	La merienda a orillas del Manzanares	1776	271 × 295 cm	Museo del Prado
	El baile de San Antonio de la Florida	1776–1777	275 × 298 cm	Museo del Prado
	El bebedor	1777	107 × 151 cm	Museo del Prado
	El quitasol (The Parasol)	1777	104 × 152 cm	Museo del Prado
	La maja y los embozados	1777	275 × 190 cm	Museo del Prado
	La riña en la Venta Nueva	1777	275 × 414 cm	Museo del Prado
	Jugadores de naipes	1777–1778	270 × 167 cm	Museo del Prado
	La cometa	1778	269 × 285 cm	Museo del Prado
	Muchachos cogiendo fruta	1778	119 × 122 cm	Museo del Prado
	Niños inflando una vejiga	1778	116 × 124 cm	Museo del Prado

== Third series (1778–1779) ==
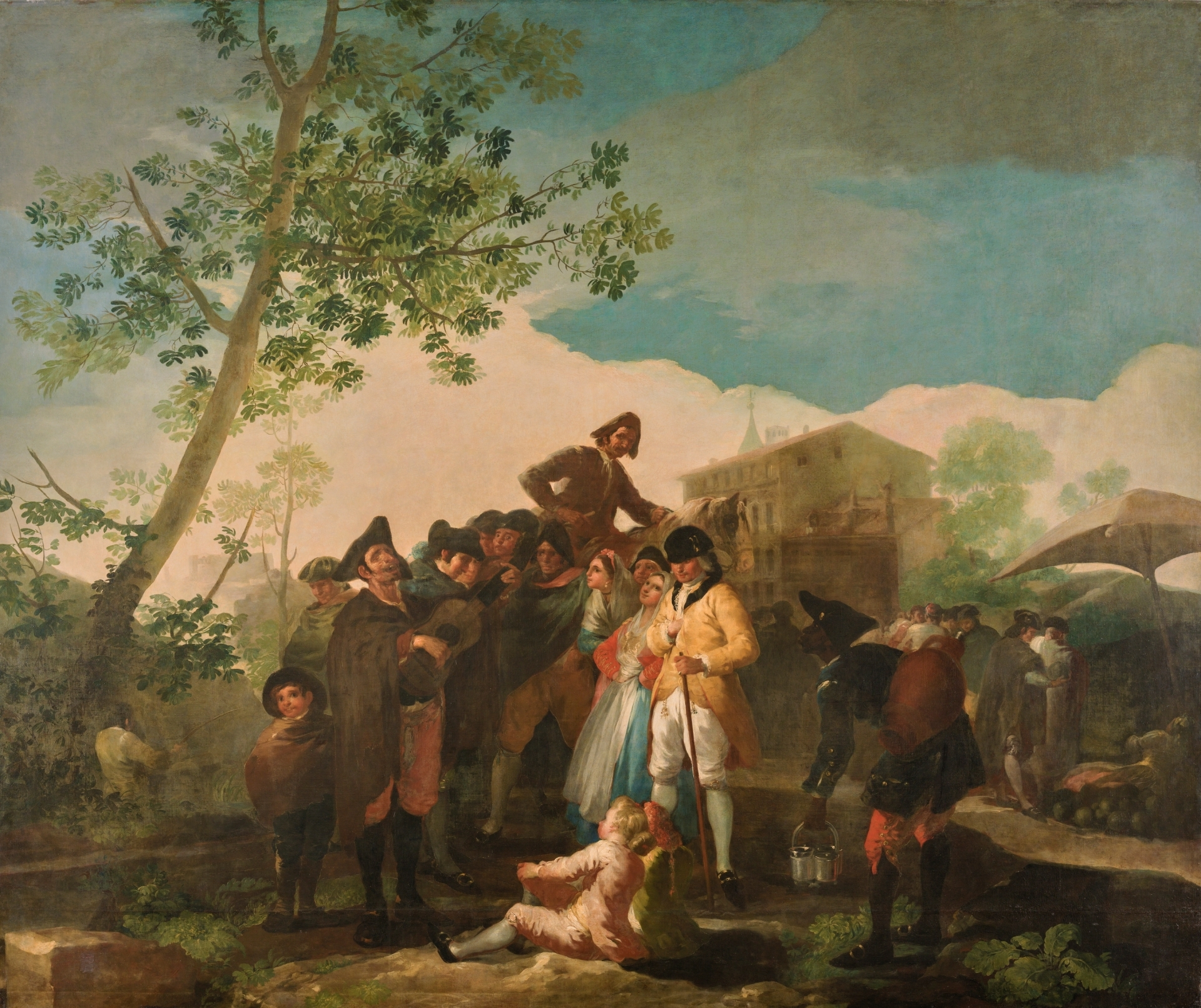
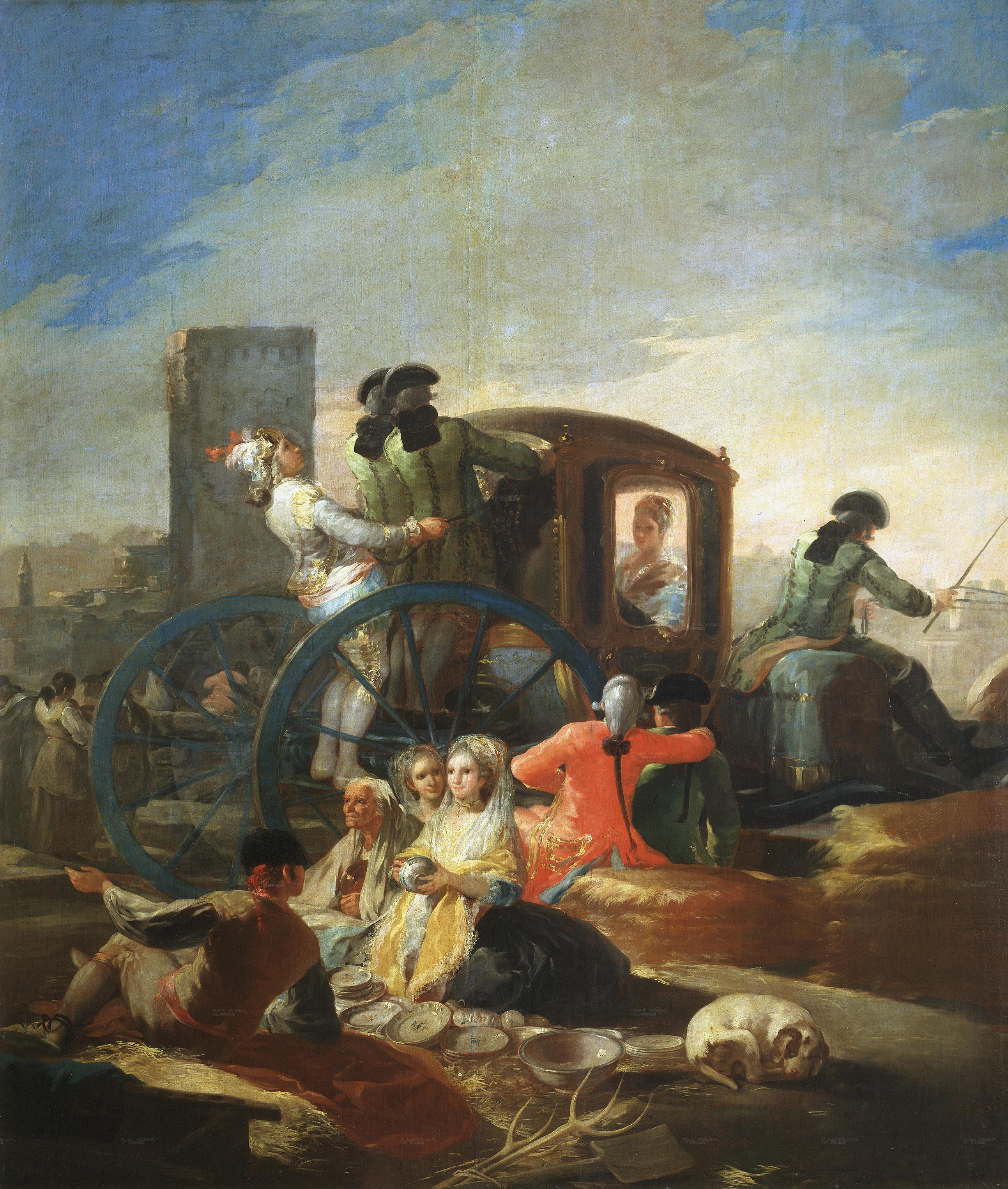
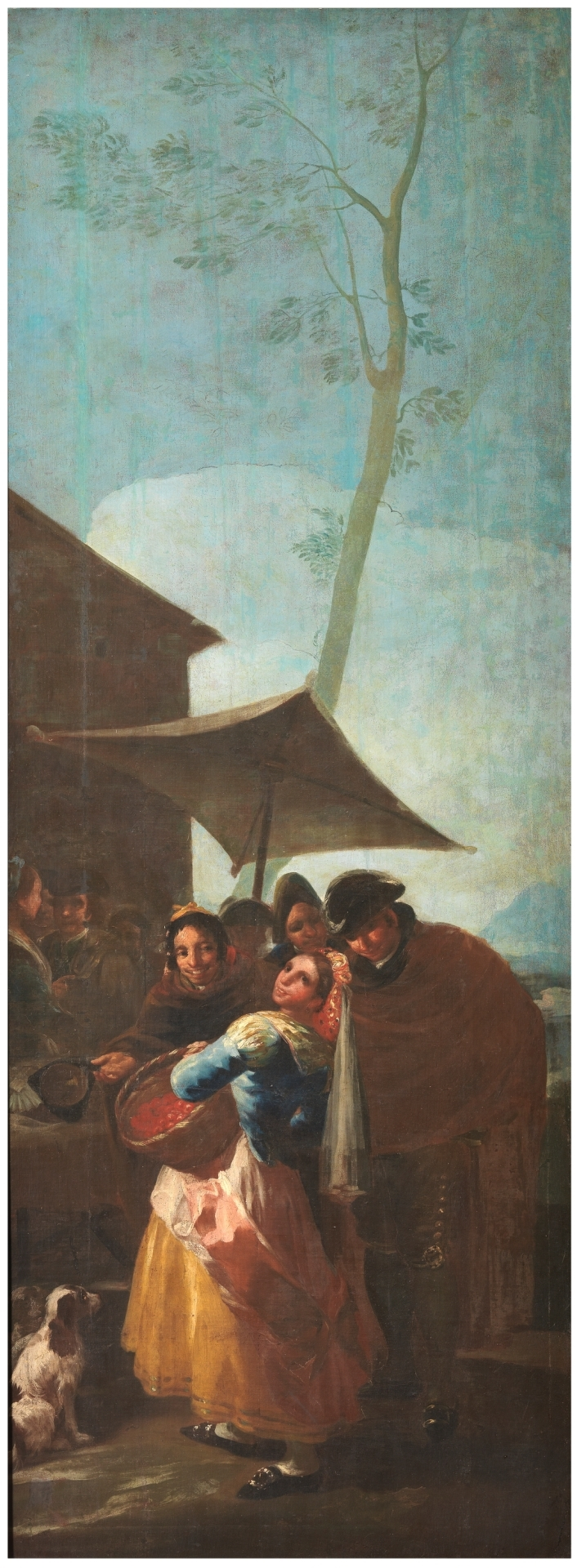
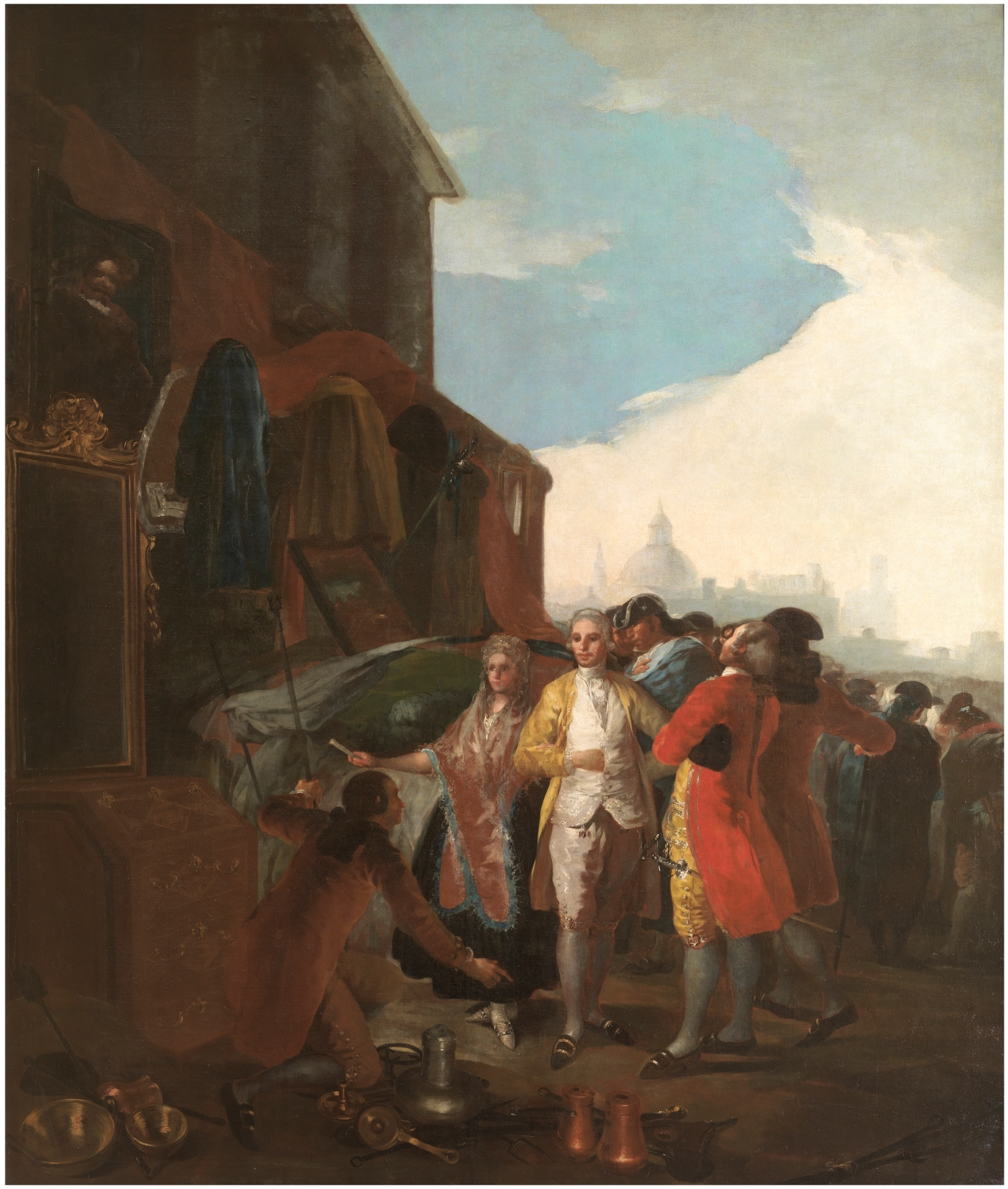
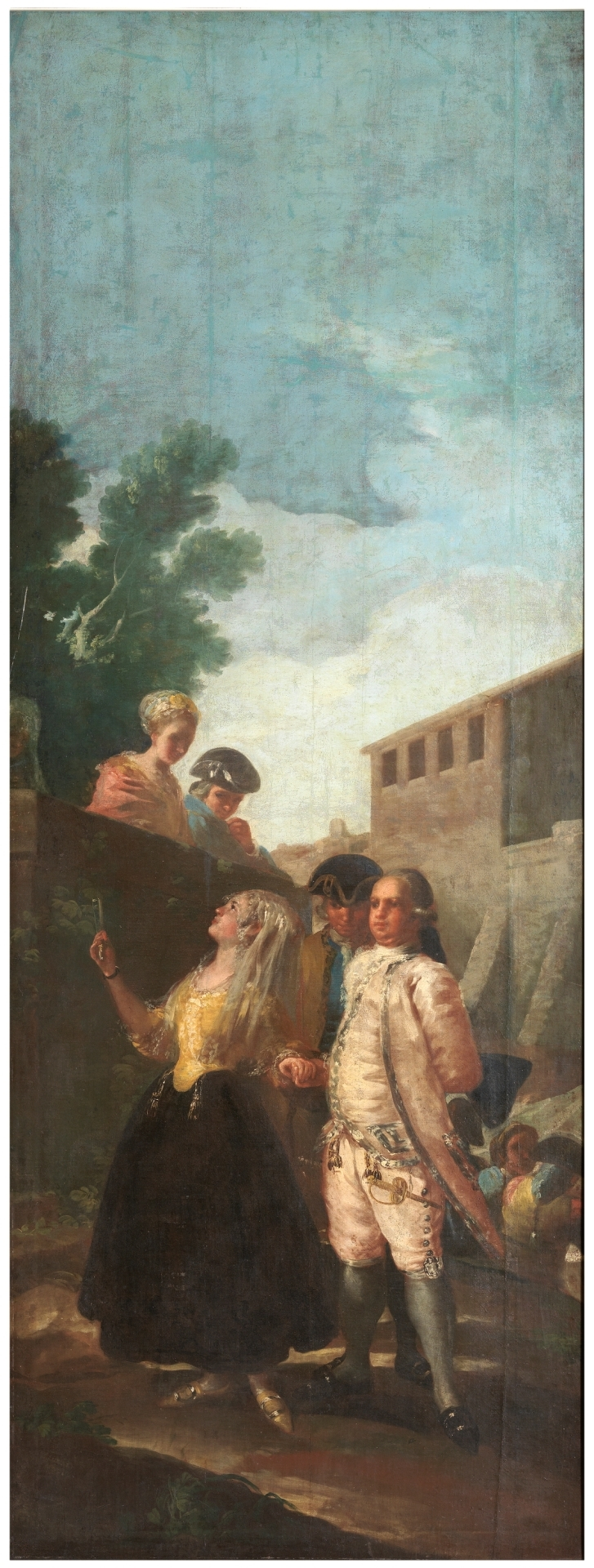
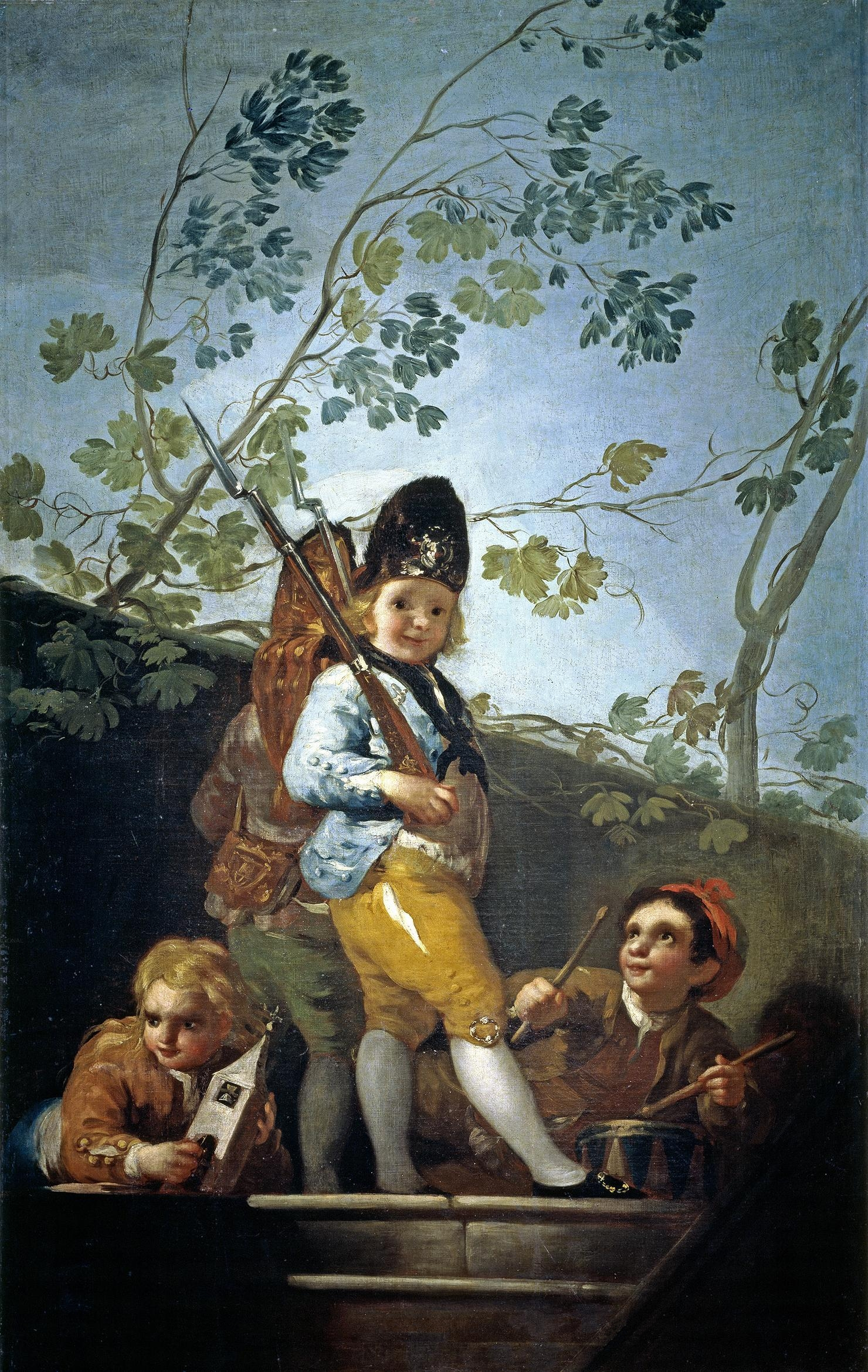
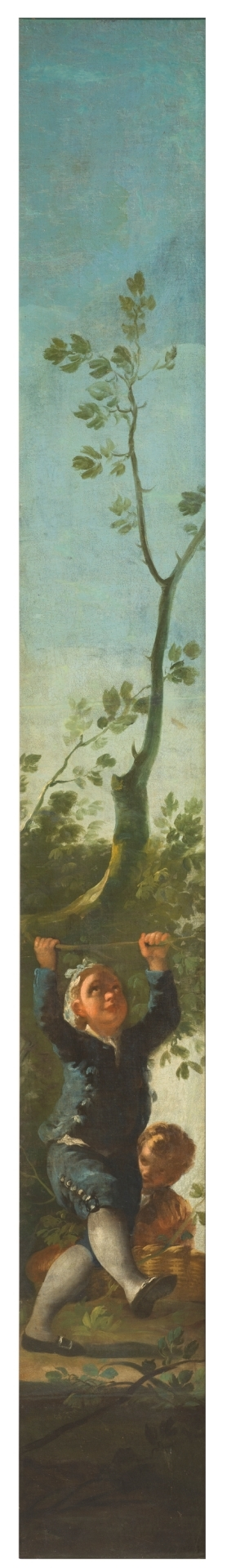
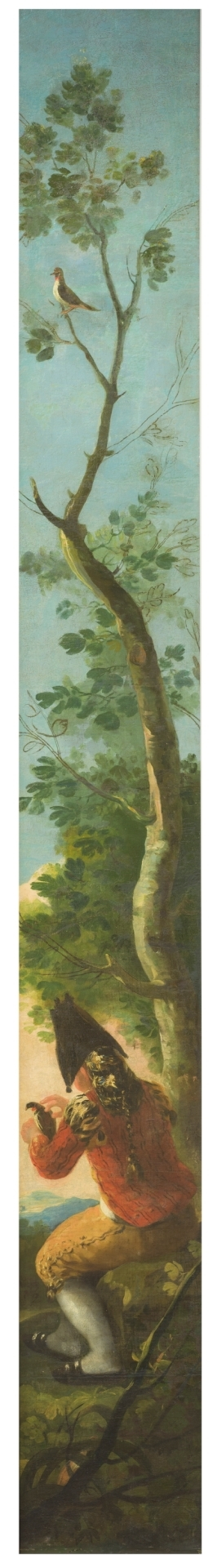
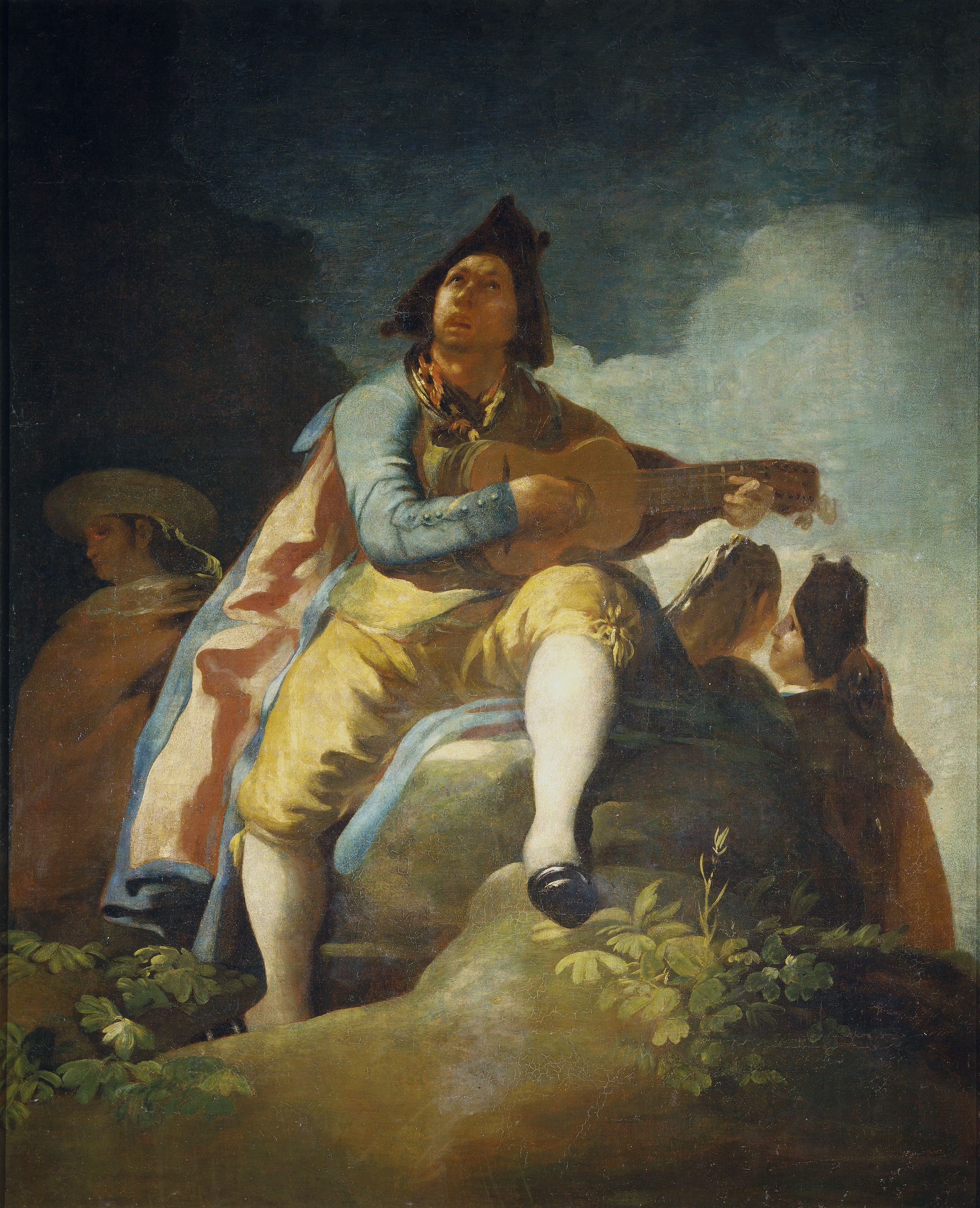
Tapestry	Spanish title	Date	Dimensions	Museum
	El ciego de la guitarra	1778–1779	260 × 311 cm	Museo del Prado
	El cacharrero	1778–1779	259 × 220 cm	Museo del Prado
	La acerolera	1778–1779	259 × 100 cm	Museo del Prado
	La feria de Madrid	1778–1779	258 × 218 cm	Museo del Prado
	El militar y la señora	1778–1779	259 × 100 cm	Museo del Prado
	Muchachos jugando a soldados	1779	146 × 94 cm	Museo del Prado
	El niño del árbol	1779–1780	262 × 40 cm	Museo del Prado
	El muchacho del pájaro	1779–1780	262 × 40 cm	Museo del Prado
	El majo de la guitarra	1779	137 × 112 cm	Museo del Prado

== Fourth series (1779–1780) ==
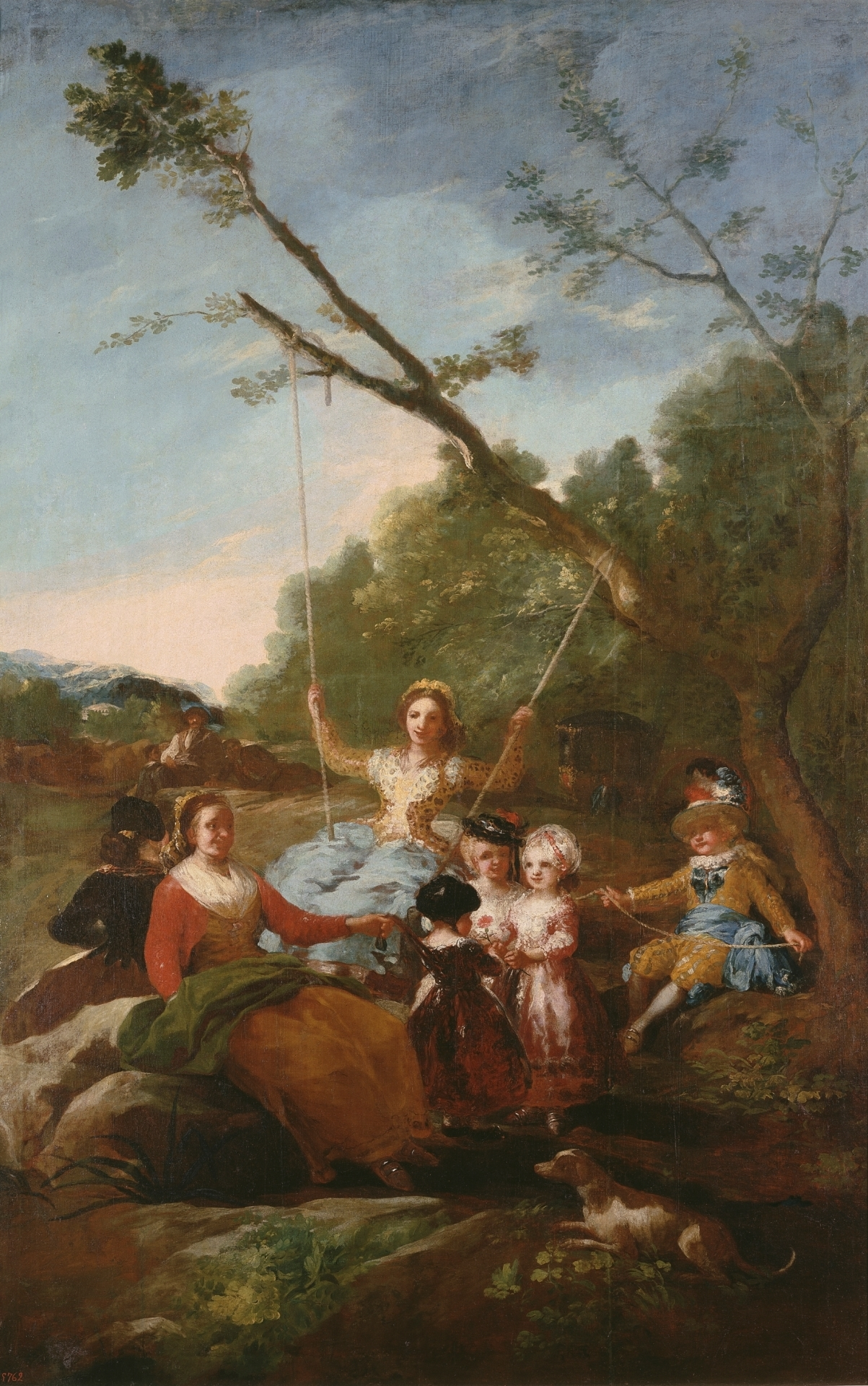
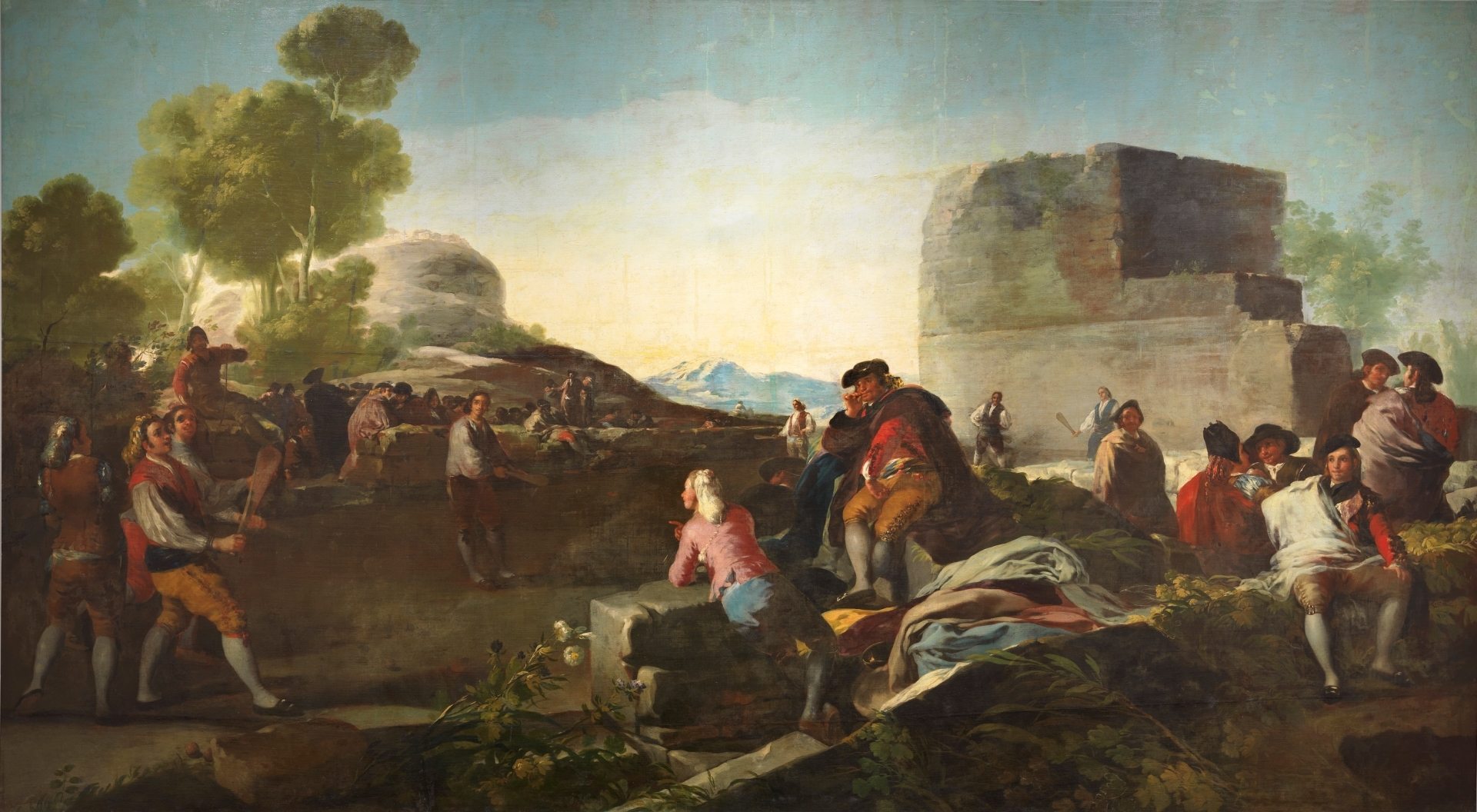
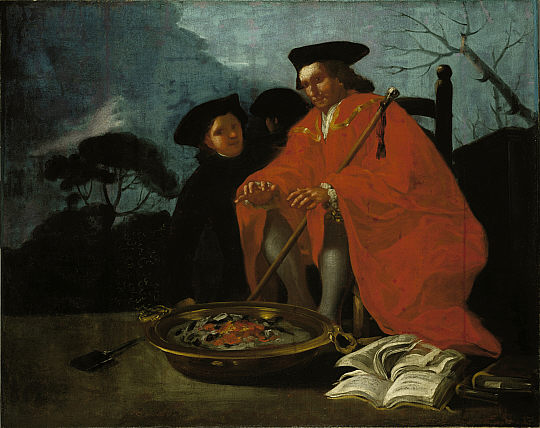
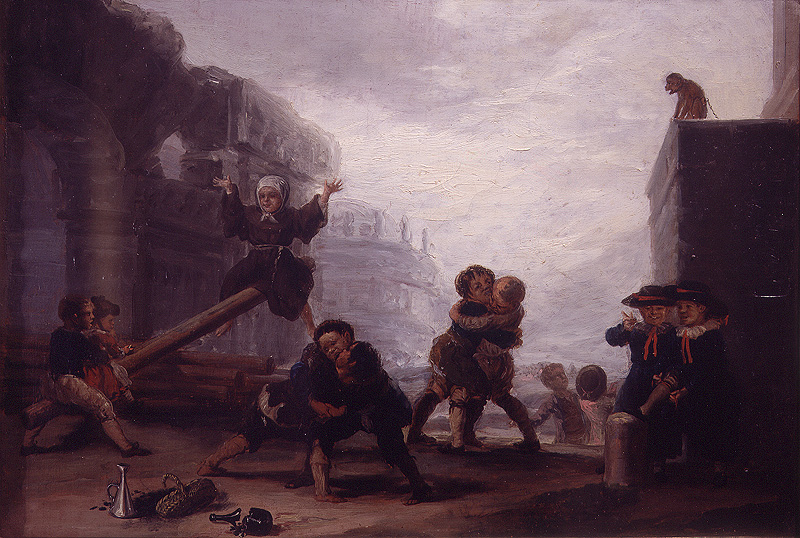
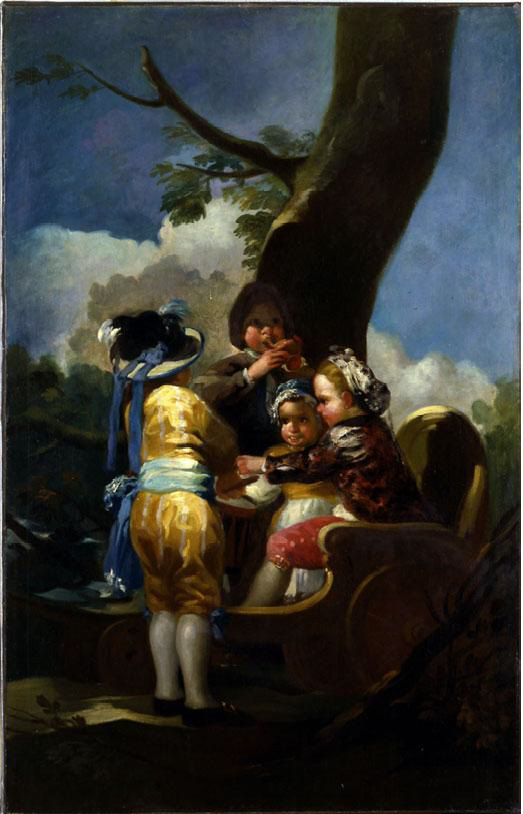
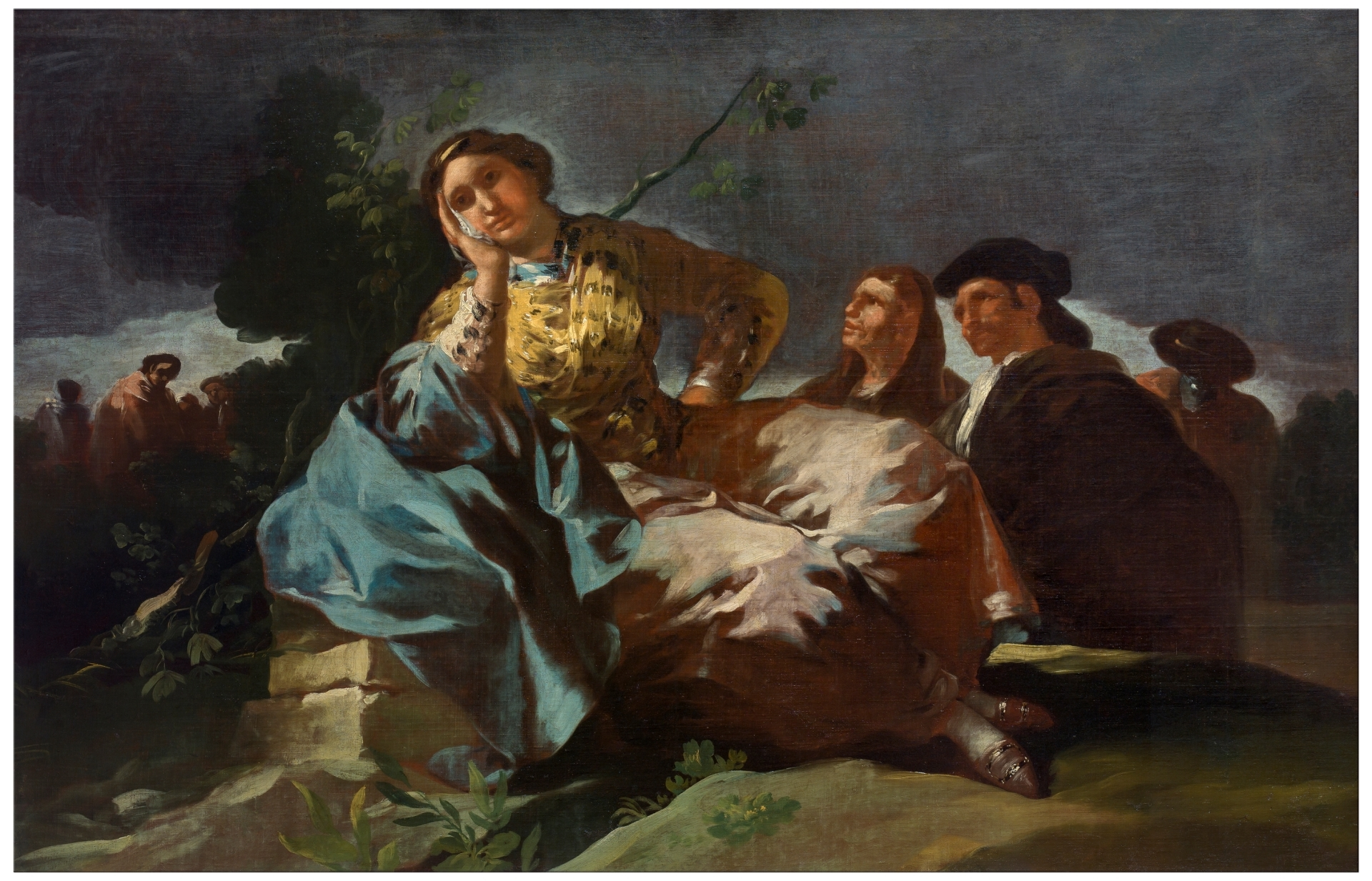
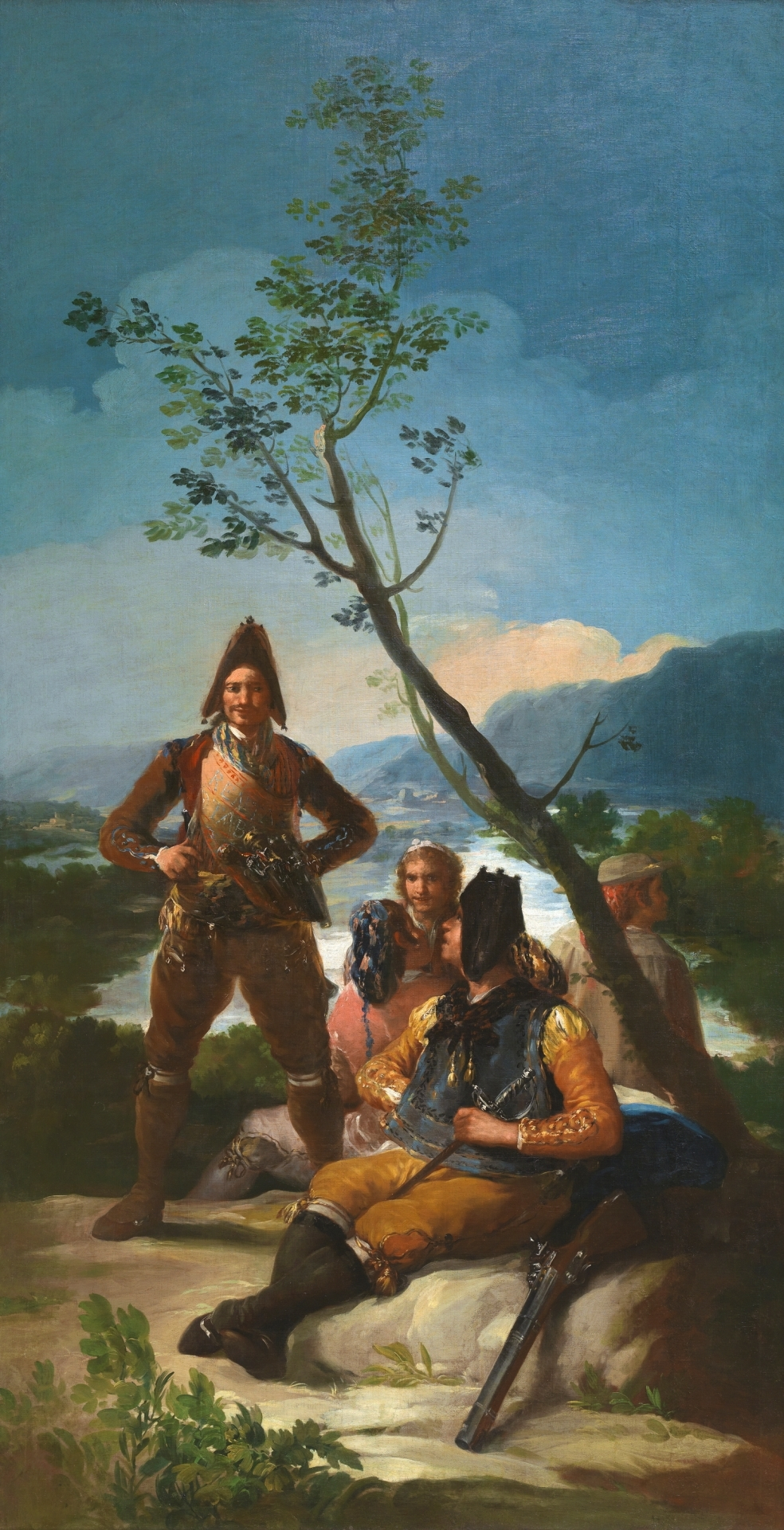
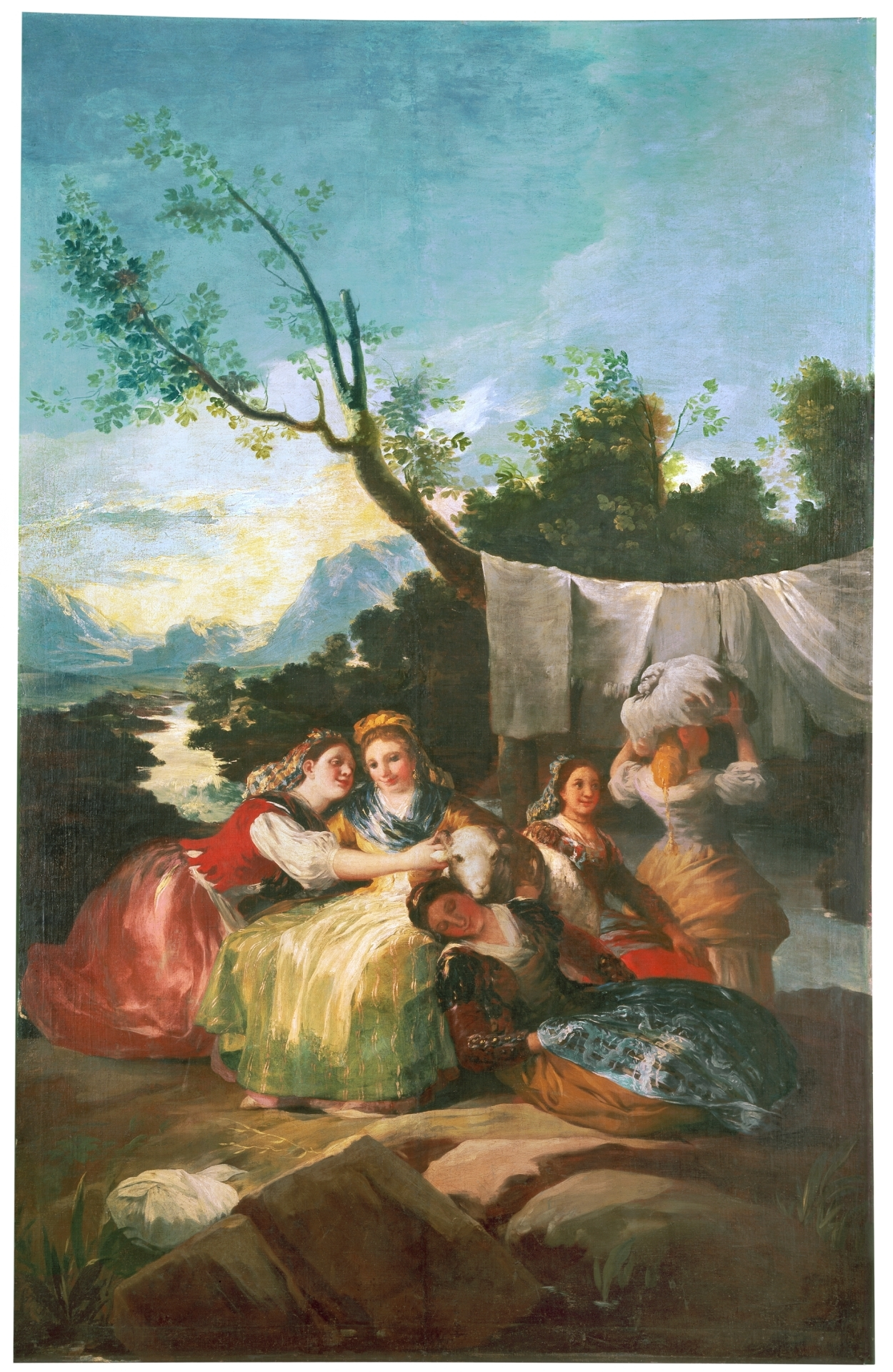
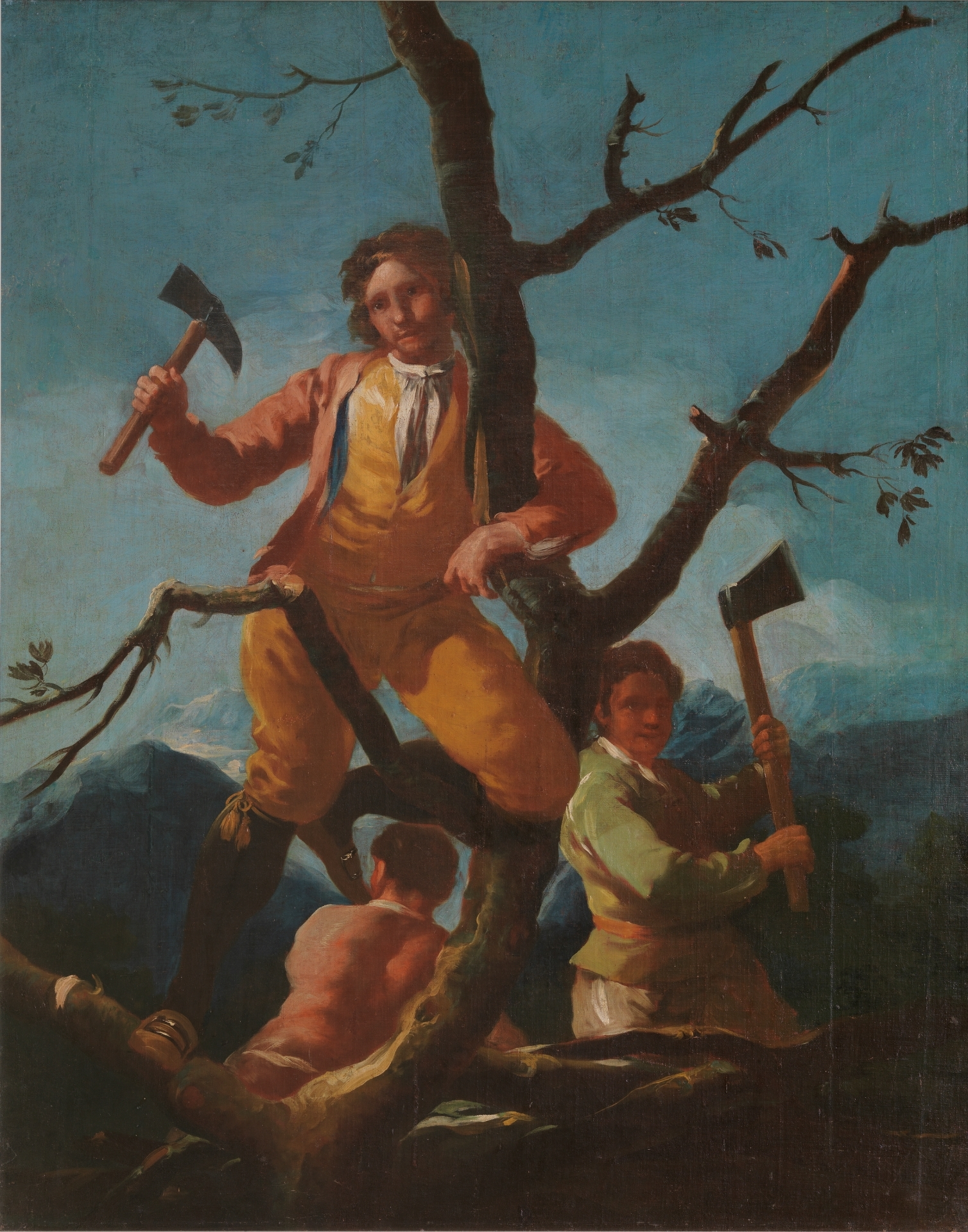
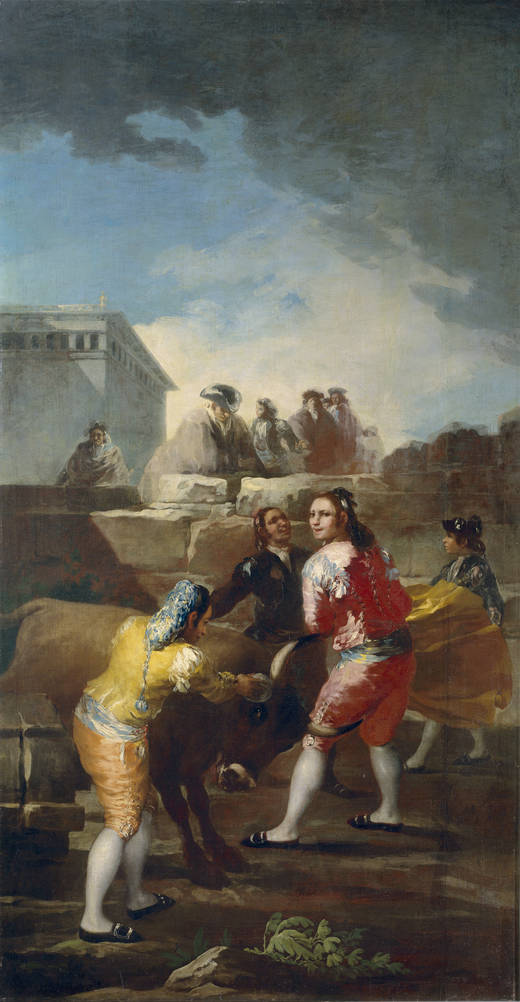
Tapestry	Spanish title	Date	Dimensions	Museum
	El columpio	1779	260 × 165 cm	Museo del Prado
	El juego de la pelota a pala	1779	261 × 470 cm	Museo del Prado
	El médico	1779	95.8 × 120.2 cm	National Gallery of Scotland
	El balancín	1780	95.8 × 120.2 cm	Museu de Belles Arts de València
	Niños del carretón	1778	30 × 43 cm	Toledo Museum of Art (Ohio)
	La cita	1779–1780	100 × 151 cm	Museo del Prado
	El resguardo de tabacos	1779–1780	262 × 137 cm	Museo del Prado
	Las lavanderas	1779–1780	218 × 166 cm	Museo del Prado
	Los leñadores	1780	141 × 114 cm	Museo del Prado
	La novillada	1780	259 × 136 cm	Museo del Prado

== Fifth series (1786–1787) ==
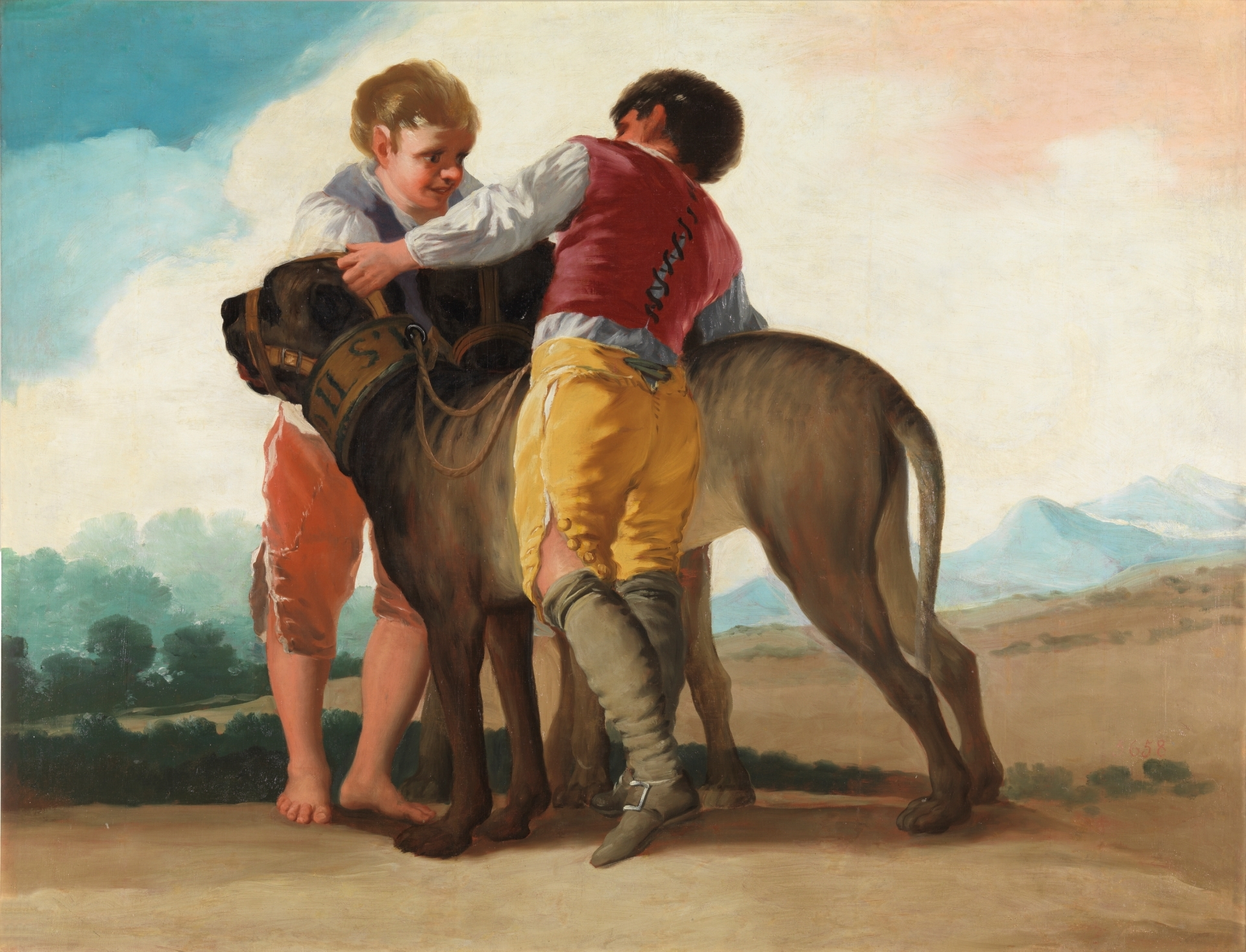
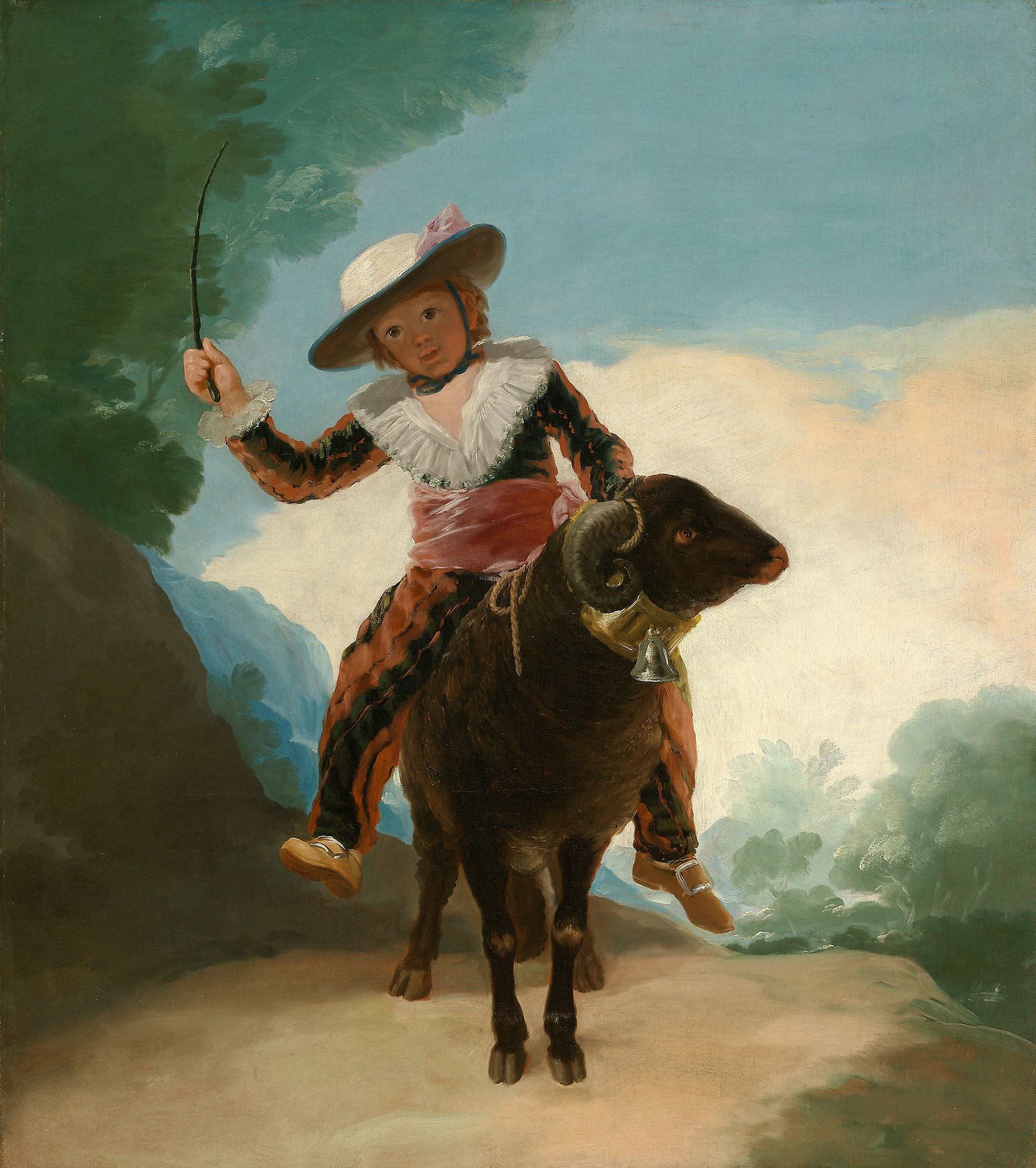
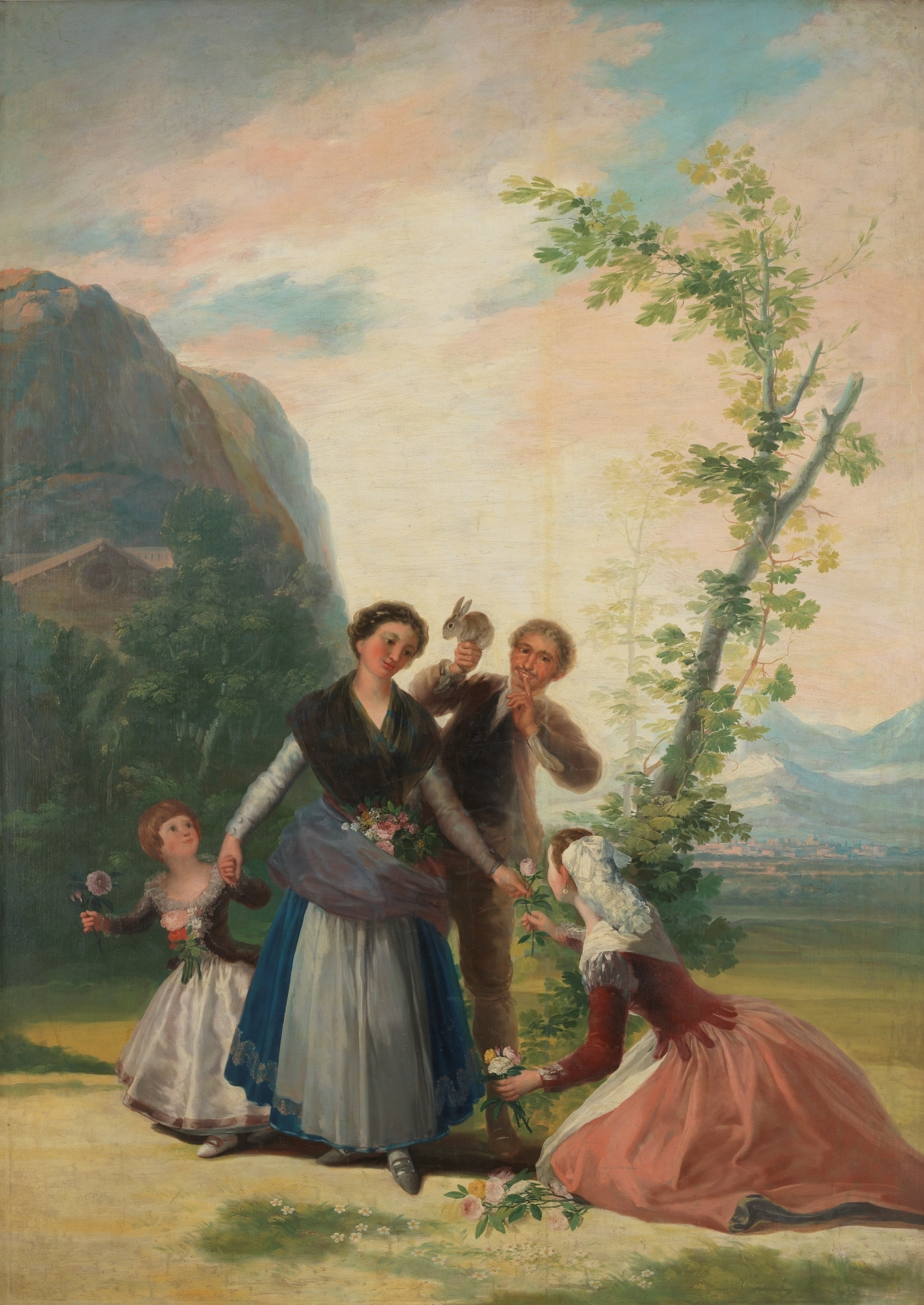
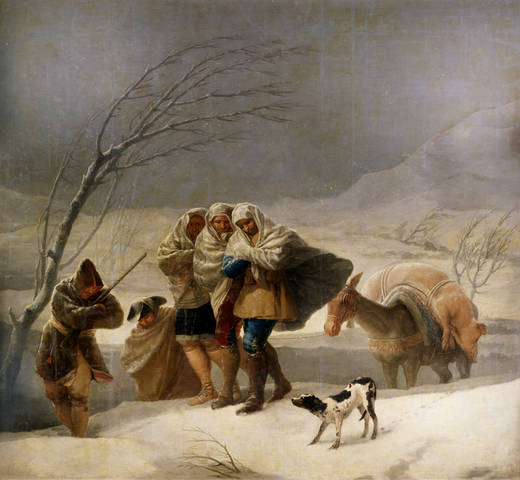
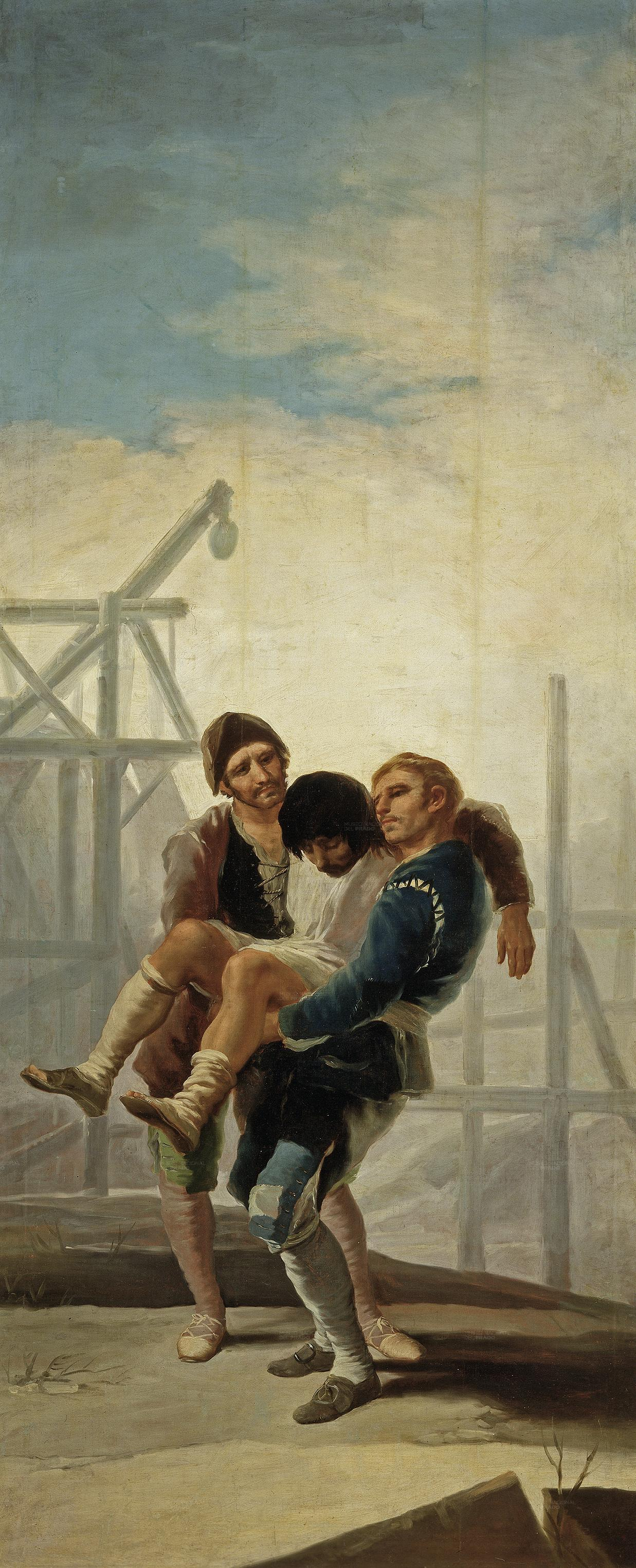
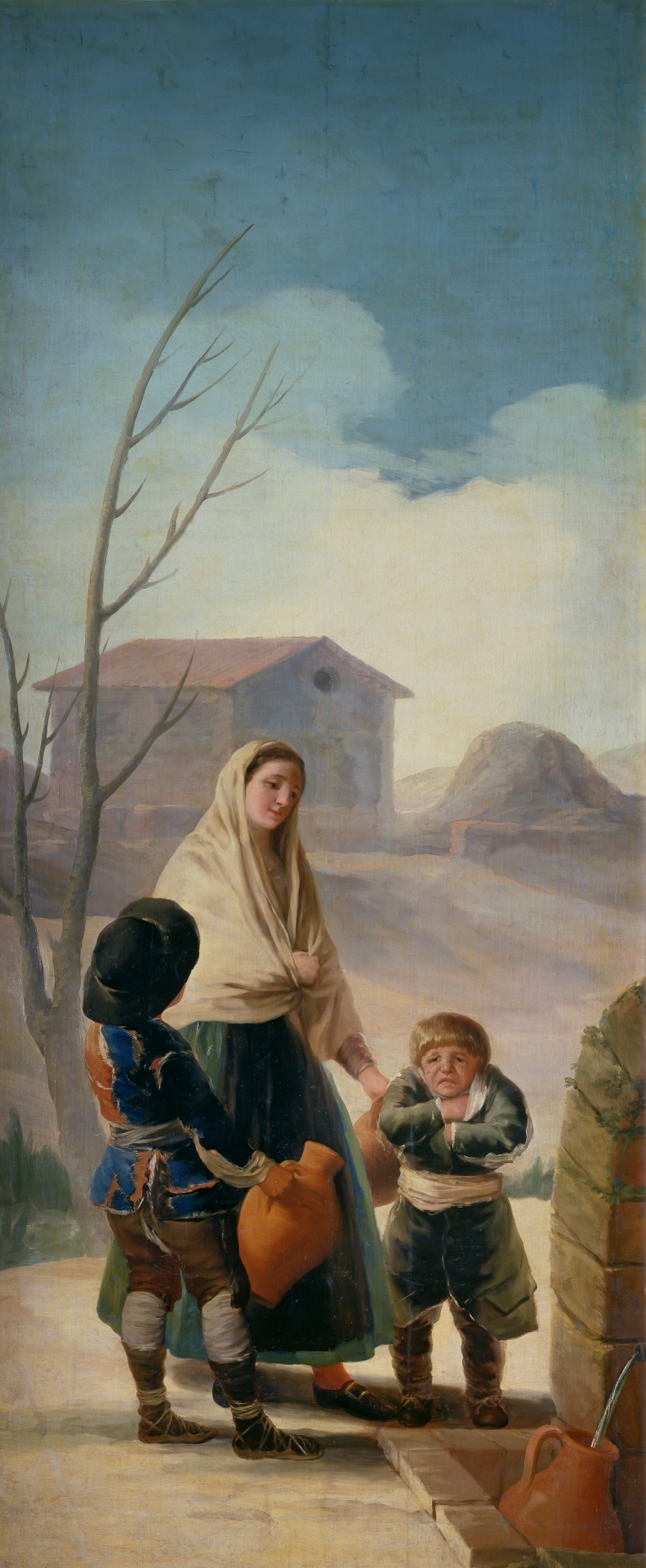
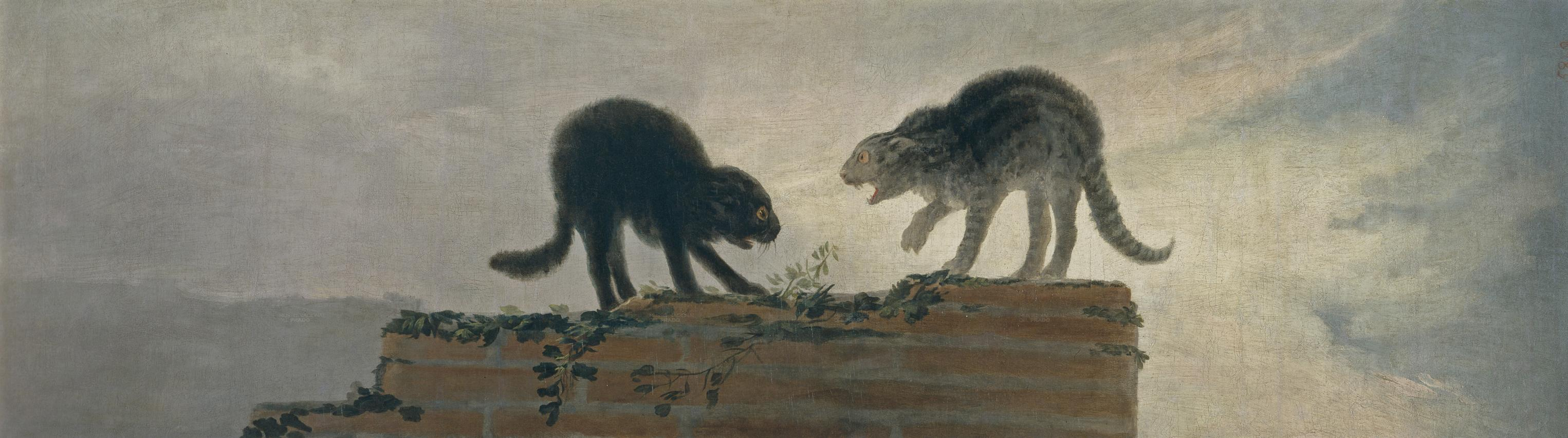
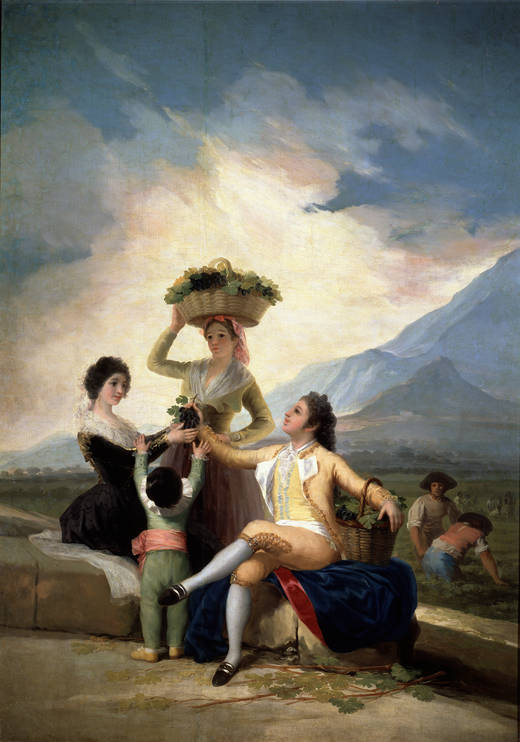
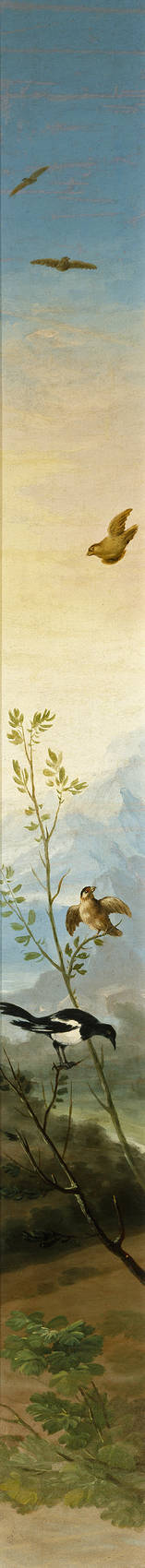
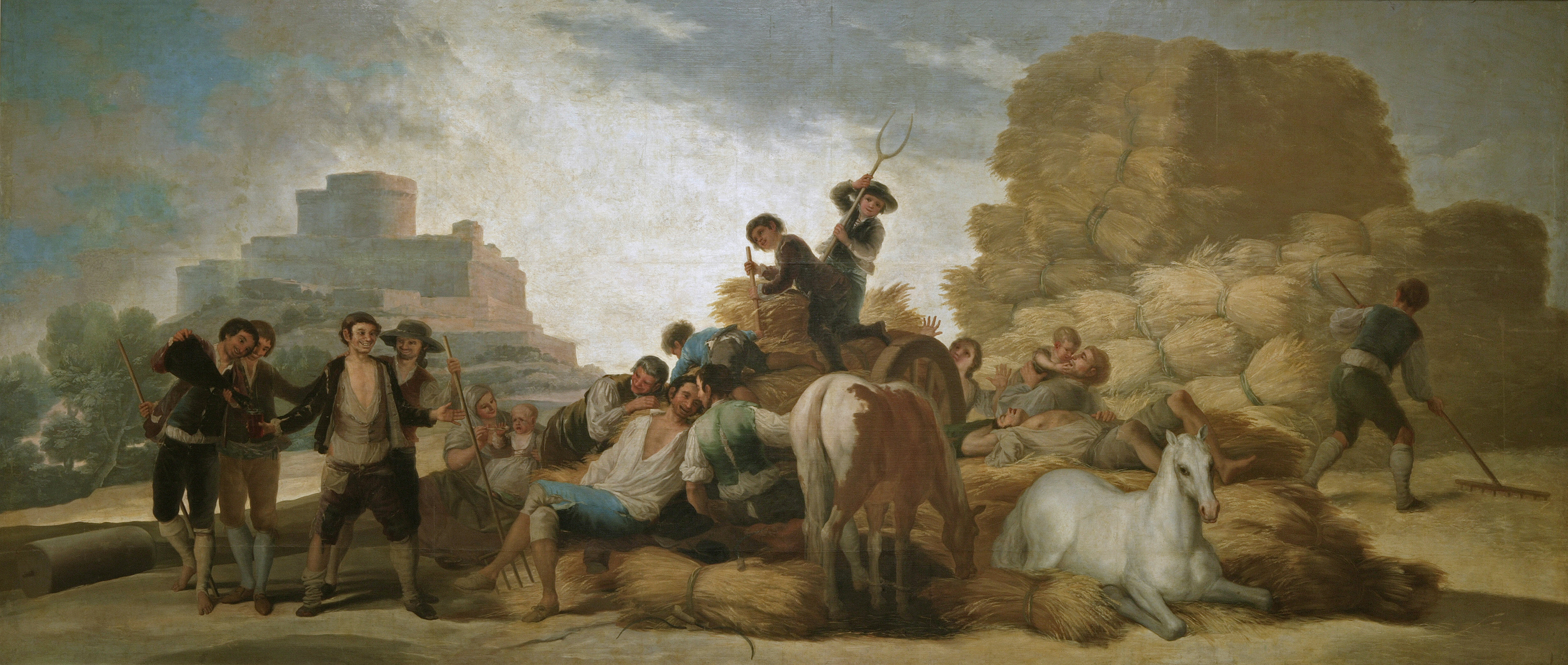
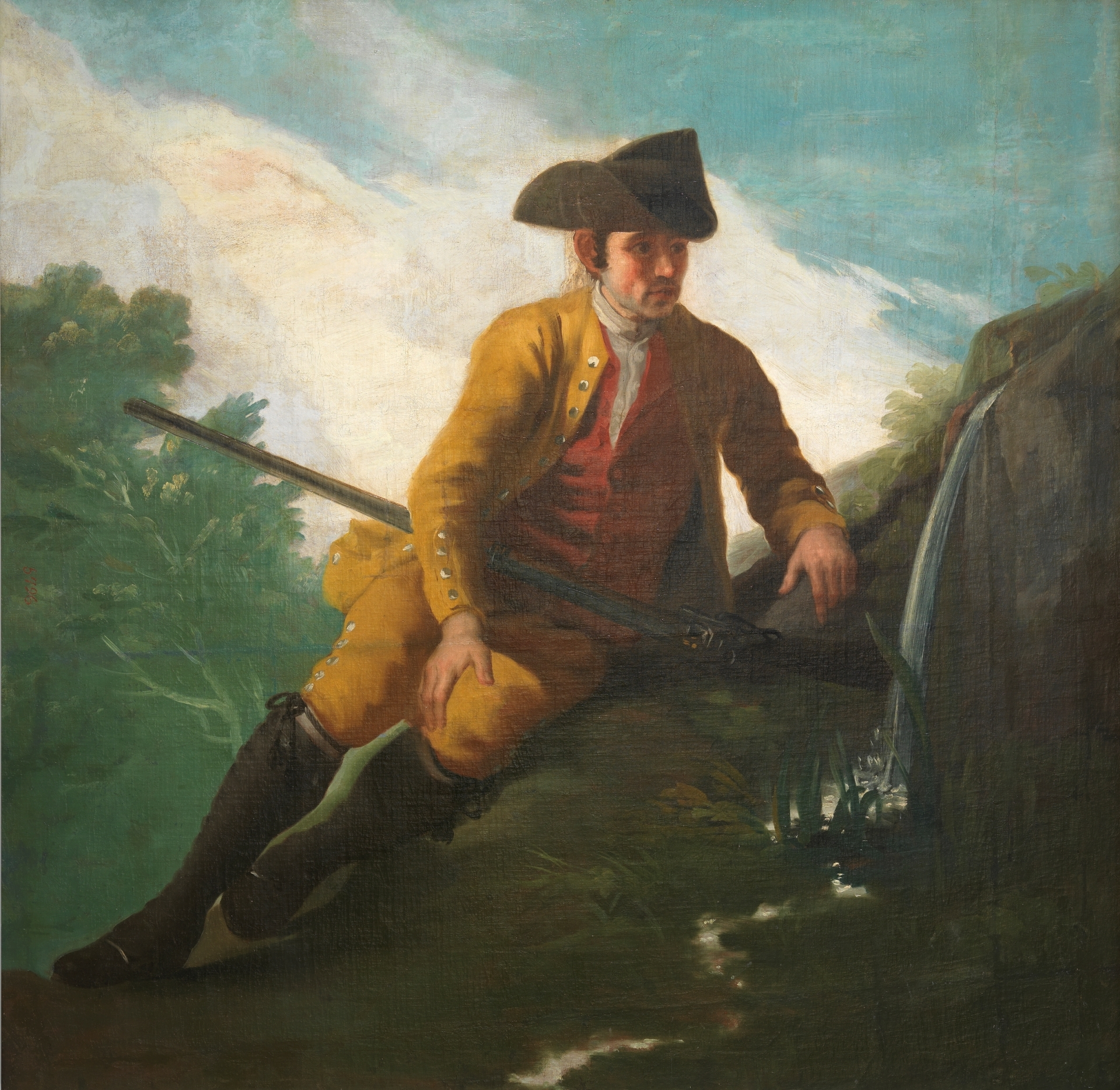
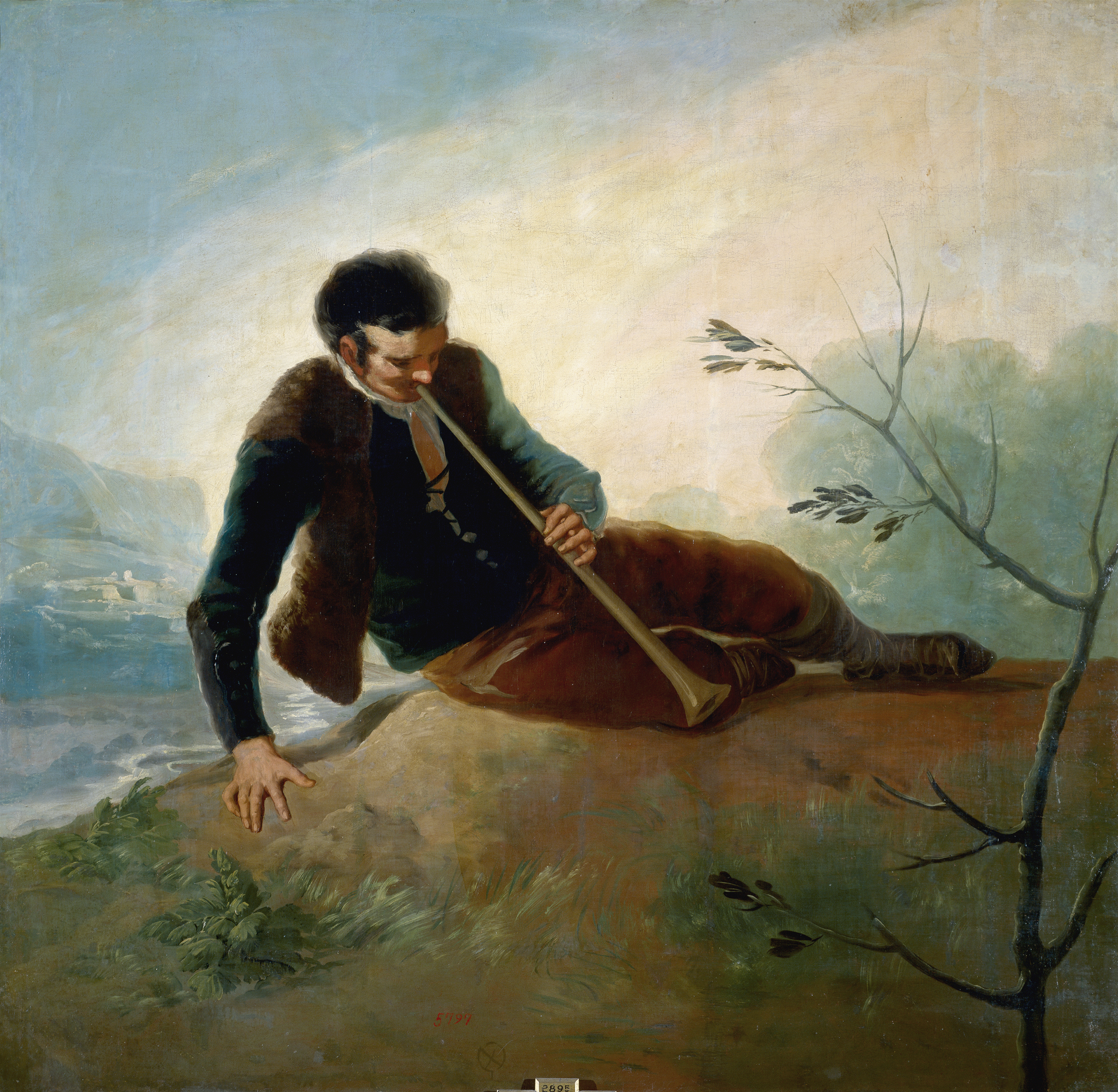
Tapestry	Spanish title	Date	Dimensions	Museum
	Niños con mastines	1786–1787	112 × 145 cm	Museo del Prado
	Niño montando un carnero	1786–1787	127.2 × 112.1 cm	Art Institute of Chicago (Illinois)
	Las floreras	1786–1787	277 × 192 cm	Museo del Prado
	La nevada	1786–1787	275 × 293 cm	Museo del Prado
	El albañil herido	1786–1787	268 × 110 cm	Museo del Prado
	Los pobres en la fuente	1786–1787	277 × 115 cm	Museo del Prado
	Riña de gatos	1786–1787	56 × 193 cm	Museo del Prado
	La vendimia	1786–1787	275 × 190 cm	Museo del Prado
	La marica en un árbol	1786–1787	279 × 28 cm	Museo del Prado
	La era	1786–1787	276 × 641 cm	Museo del Prado
	Cazador junto a una fuente	1786–1788	130 × 131 cm	Museo del Prado
	Pastor tocando la dulzaina	1786–1788	130 × 134 cm	Museo del Prado

== Sixth series (1787–1788) ==
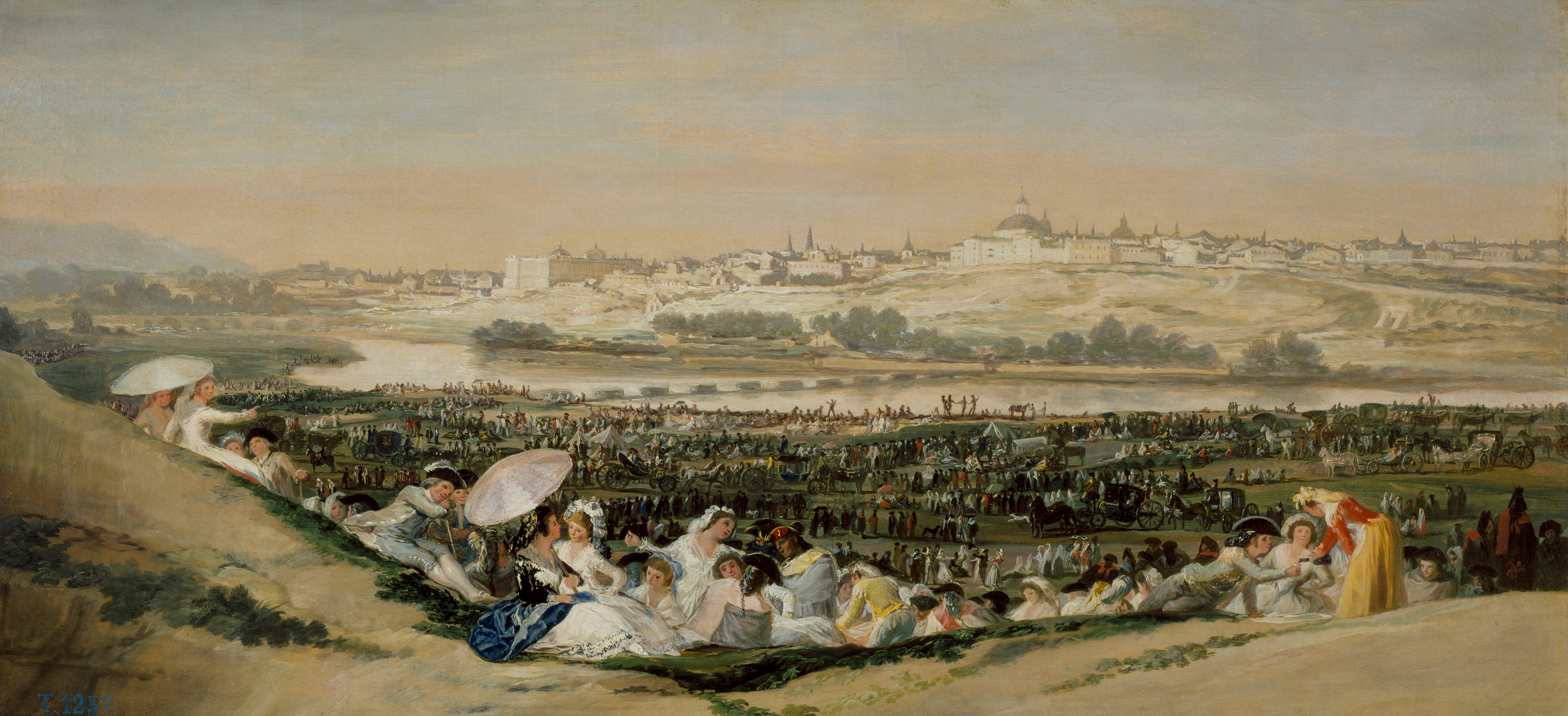
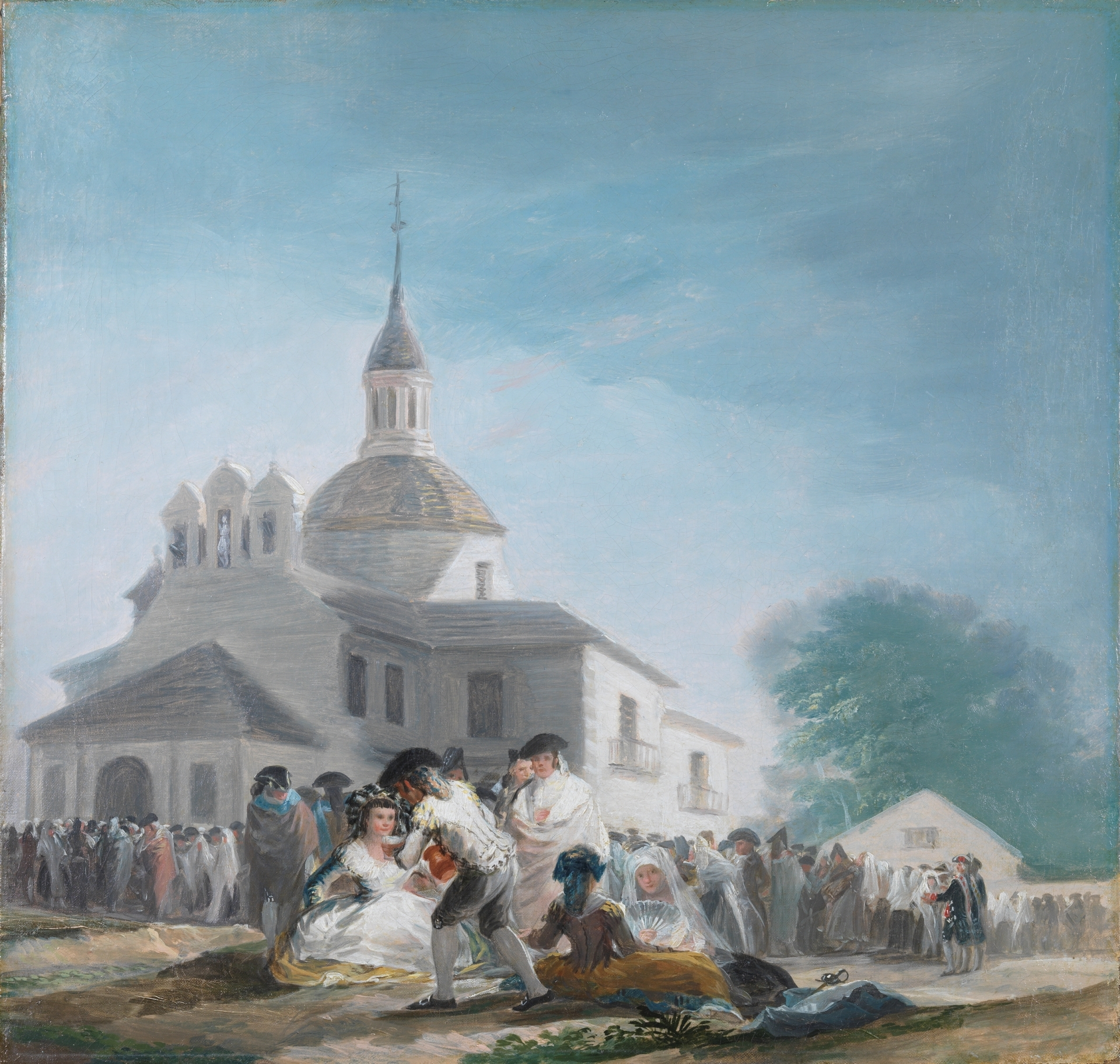
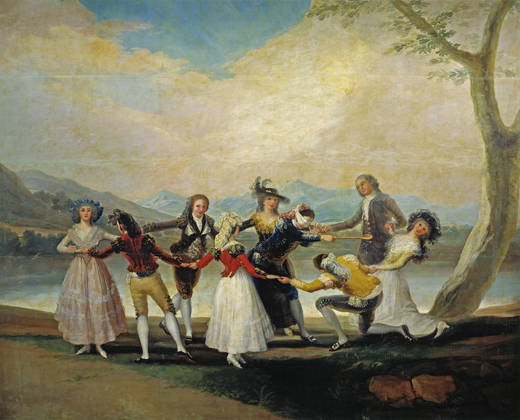
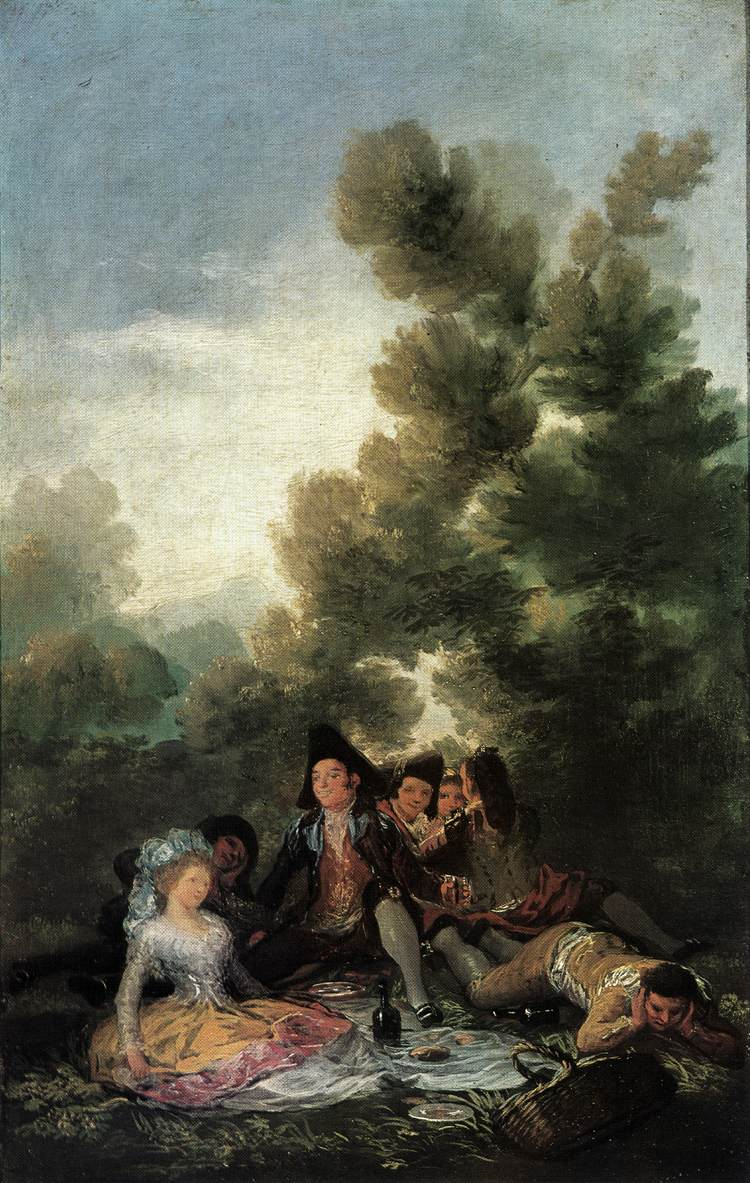
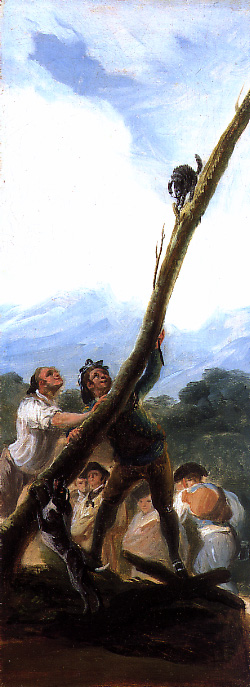
Tapestry	Spanish title	Date	Dimensions	Museum
	La pradera de San Isidro	1788	44 × 94 cm	Museo del Prado
	La ermita de San Isidro el día de la fiesta	1788	42 × 44 cm	Museo del Prado
	La gallina ciega (Blind man's bluff)	1788–1789	269 × 350 cm	Museo del Prado
	Merienda campestre	1786	41.3 × 25.8 cm	National Gallery of London
	Gato acosado	1786	42 × 15.5 cm	Colección particular (Madrid)

== Seventh series (1791–1792) ==
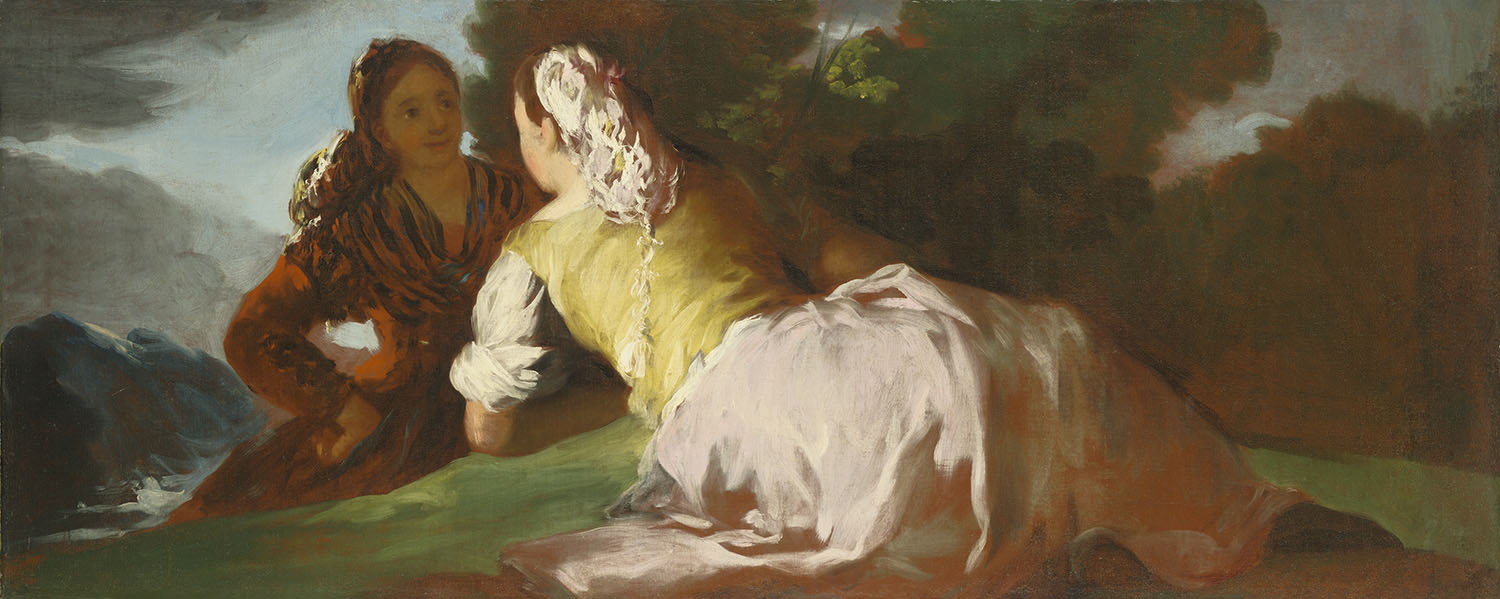
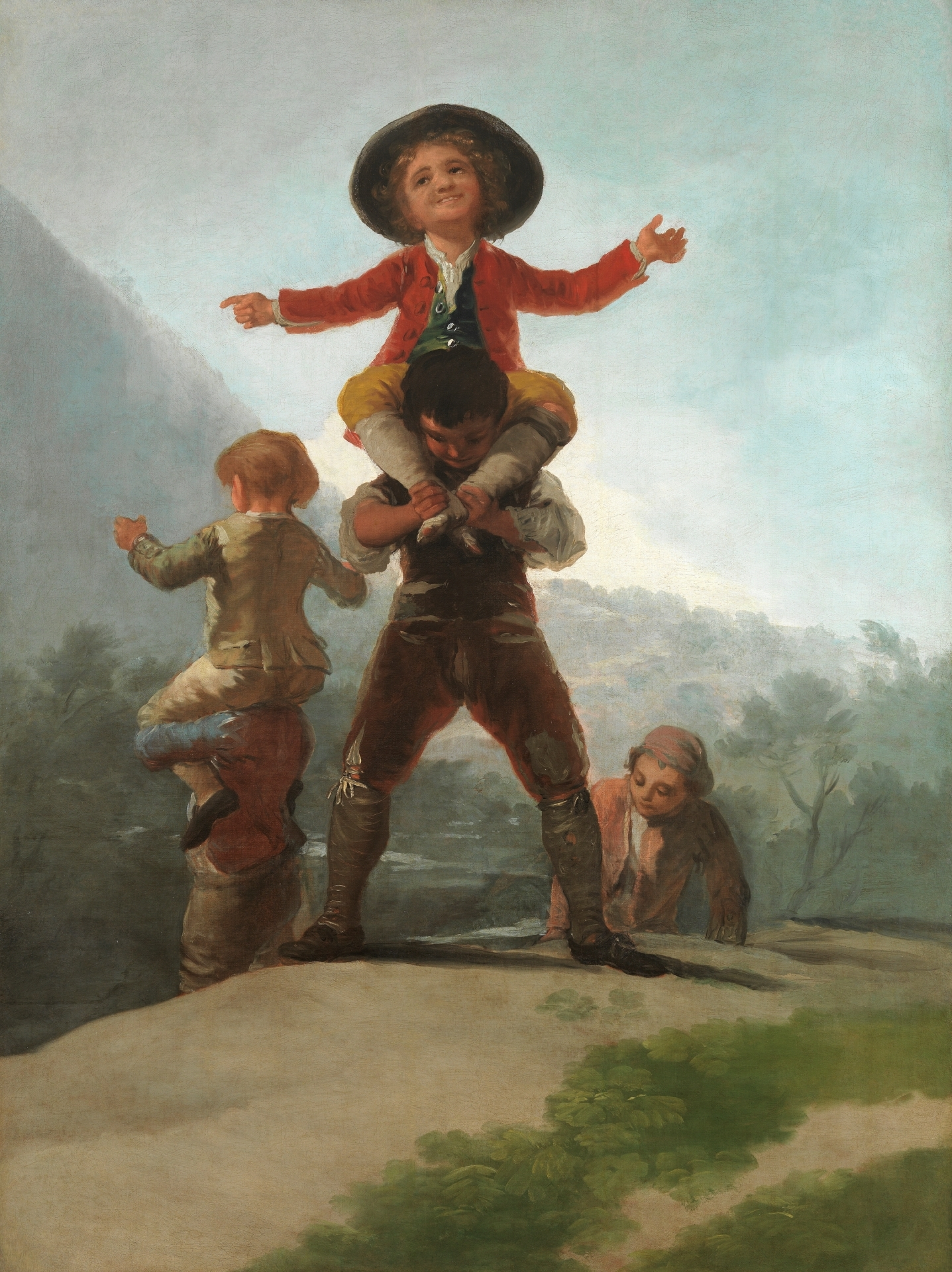
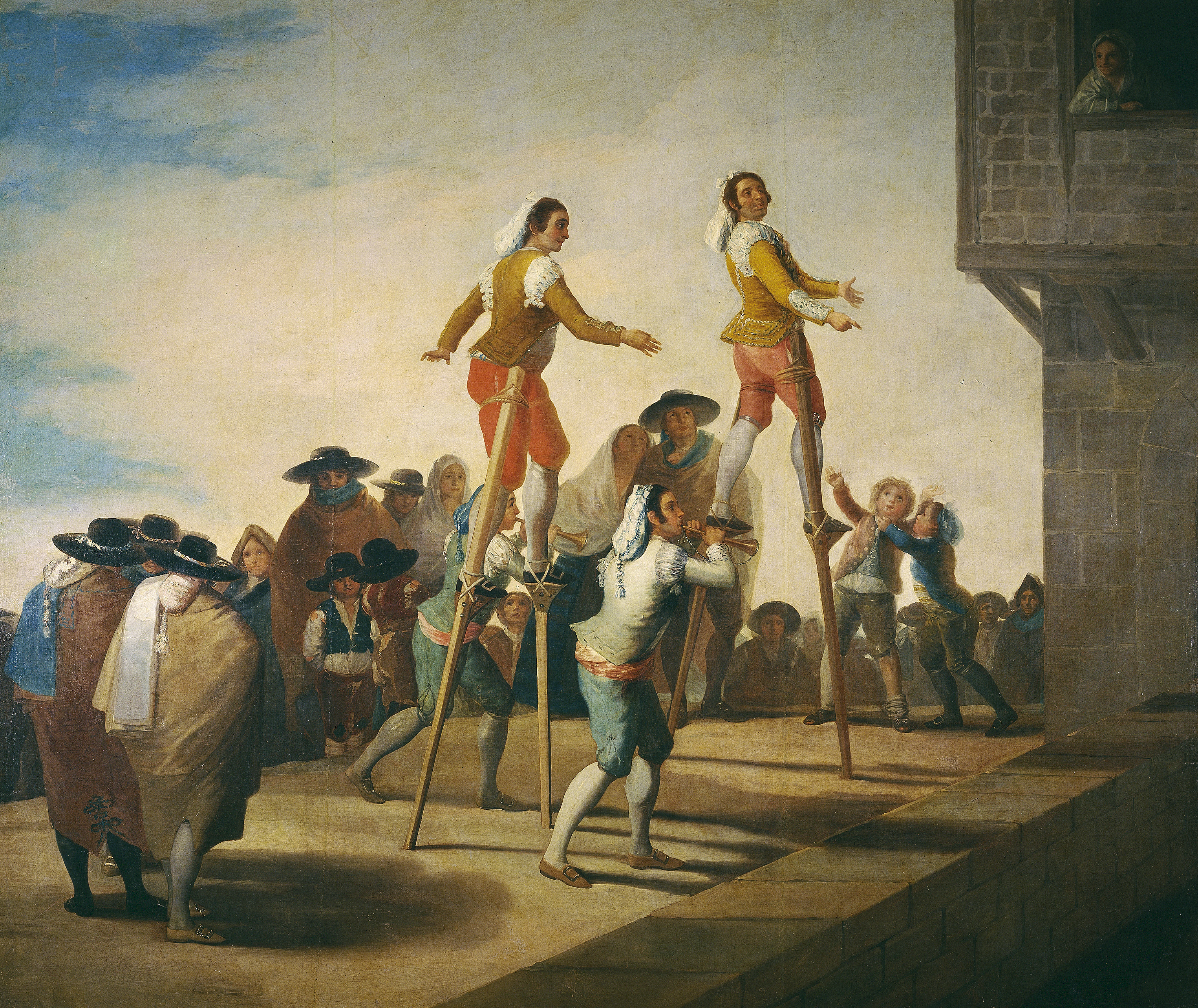
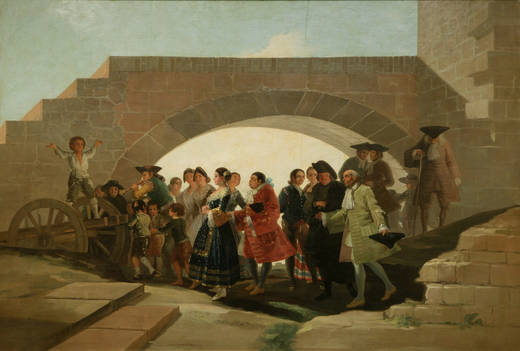
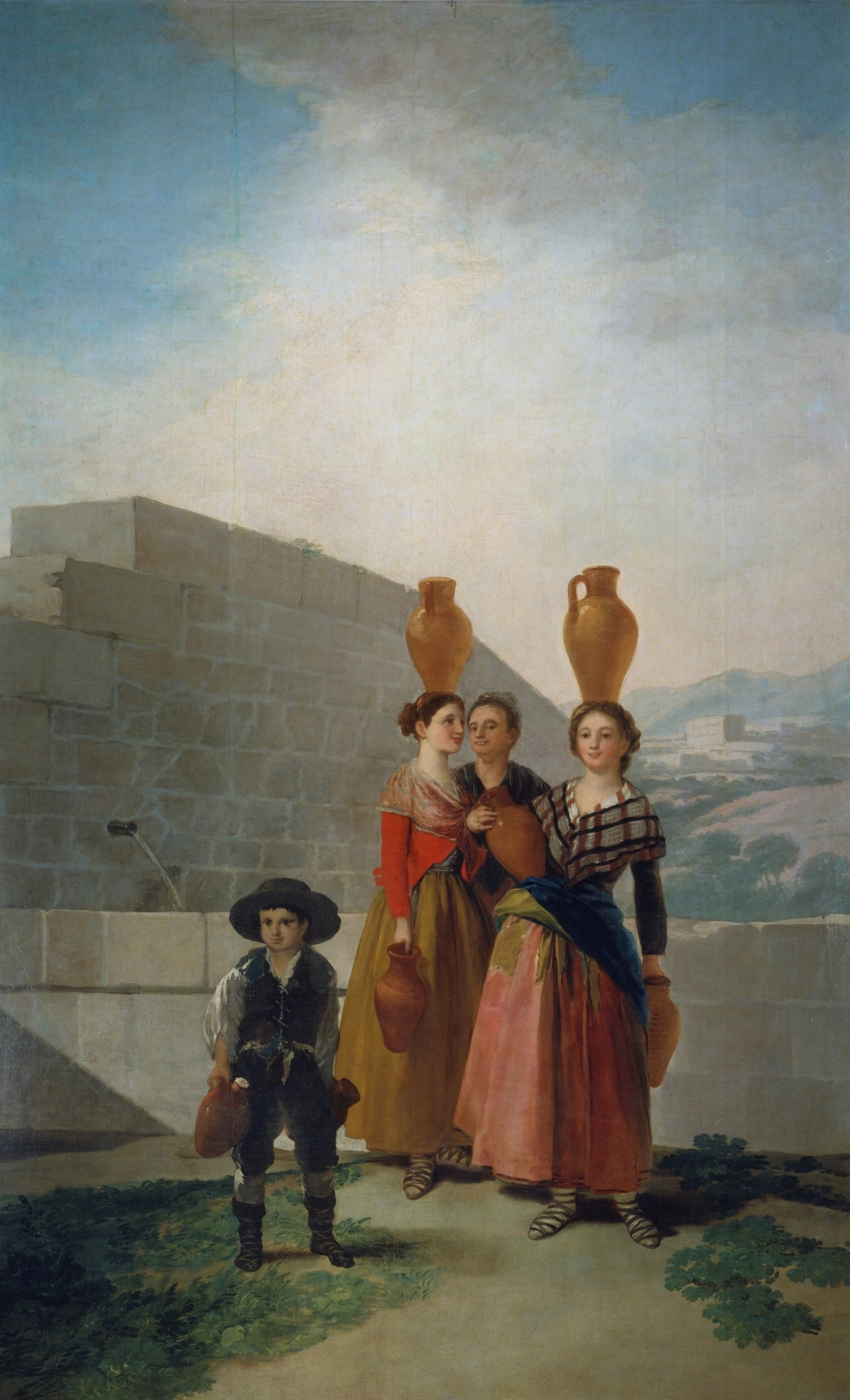
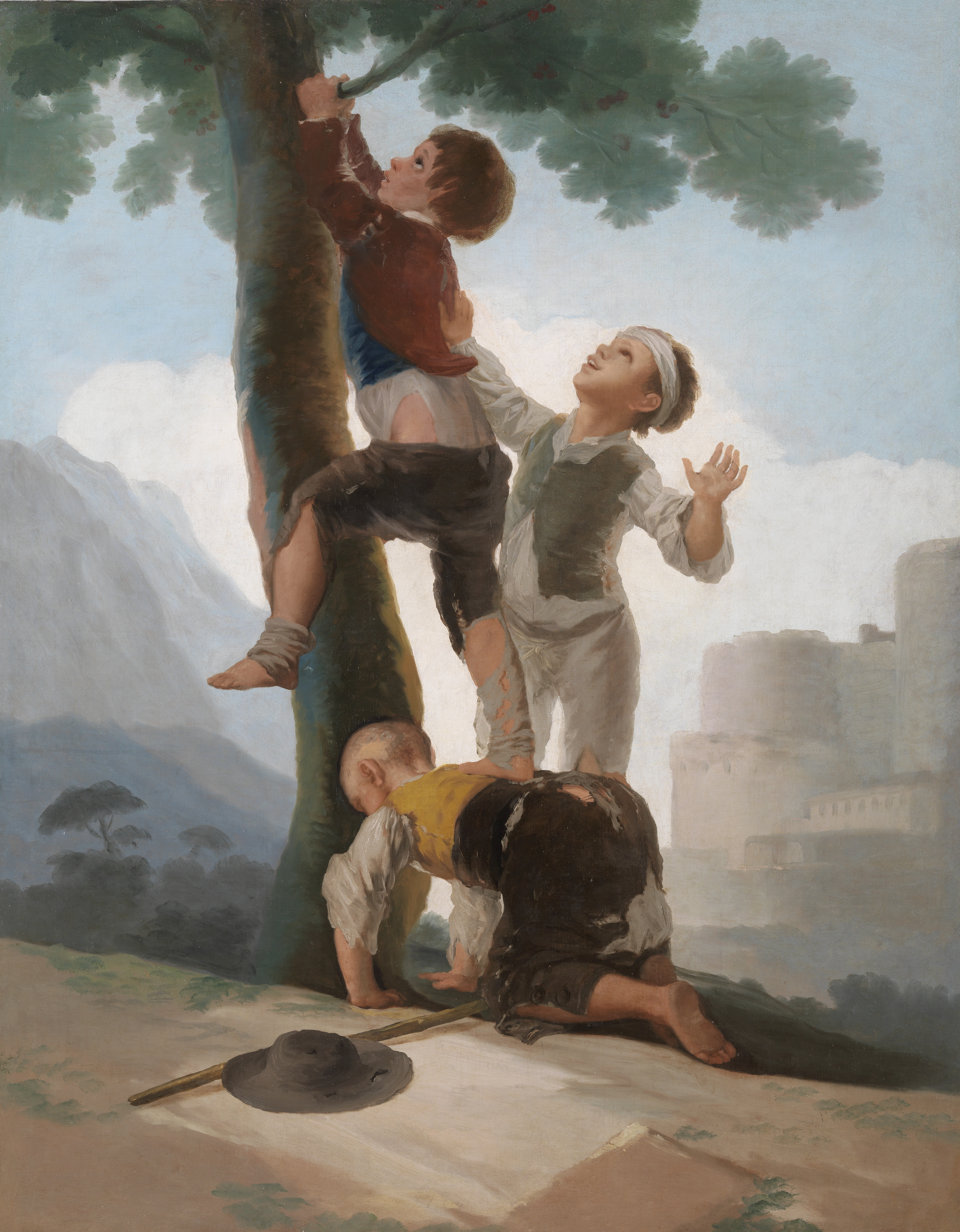
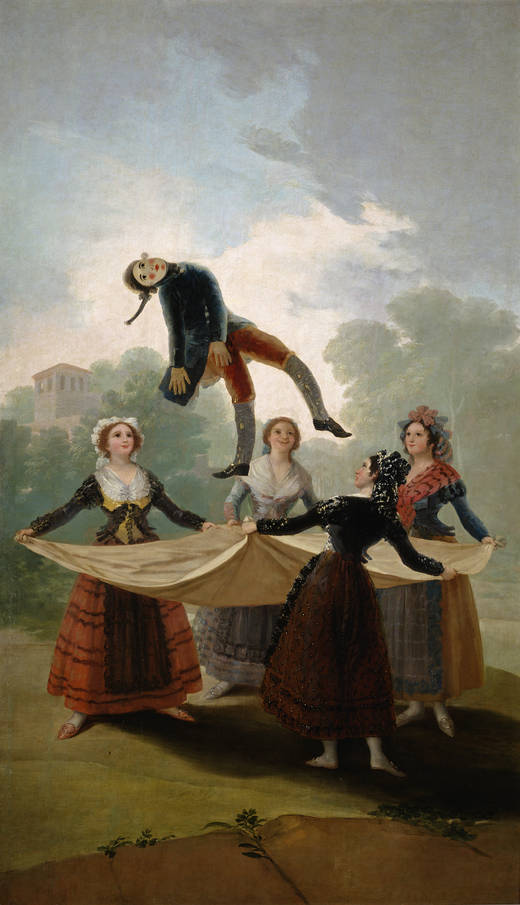
Tapestry	Spanish title	Date	Dimensions	Museum
	Mujeres conversando	1791–1792	59 × 145 cm	Wadsworth Atheneum (Hartford)
	Las gigantillas	1791–1792	137 × 104 cm	Museo del Prado
	Los zancos	1791–1792	137 × 104 cm	Museo del Prado
	La boda	1791–1792	268 × 320 cm	Museo del Prado
	Las mozas del cántaro	1791–1792	262 × 160 cm	Museo del Prado
	Muchachos trepando a un árbol	1791–1792	141 × 111 cm	Museo del Prado
	El pelele	1791–1792	267 × 160 cm	Museo del Prado

== Sketches ==
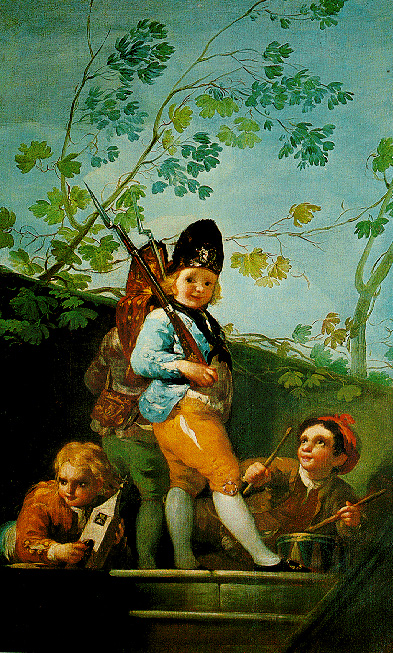
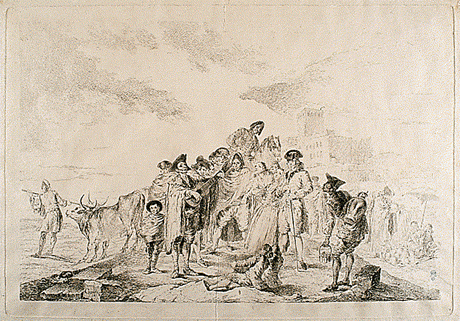
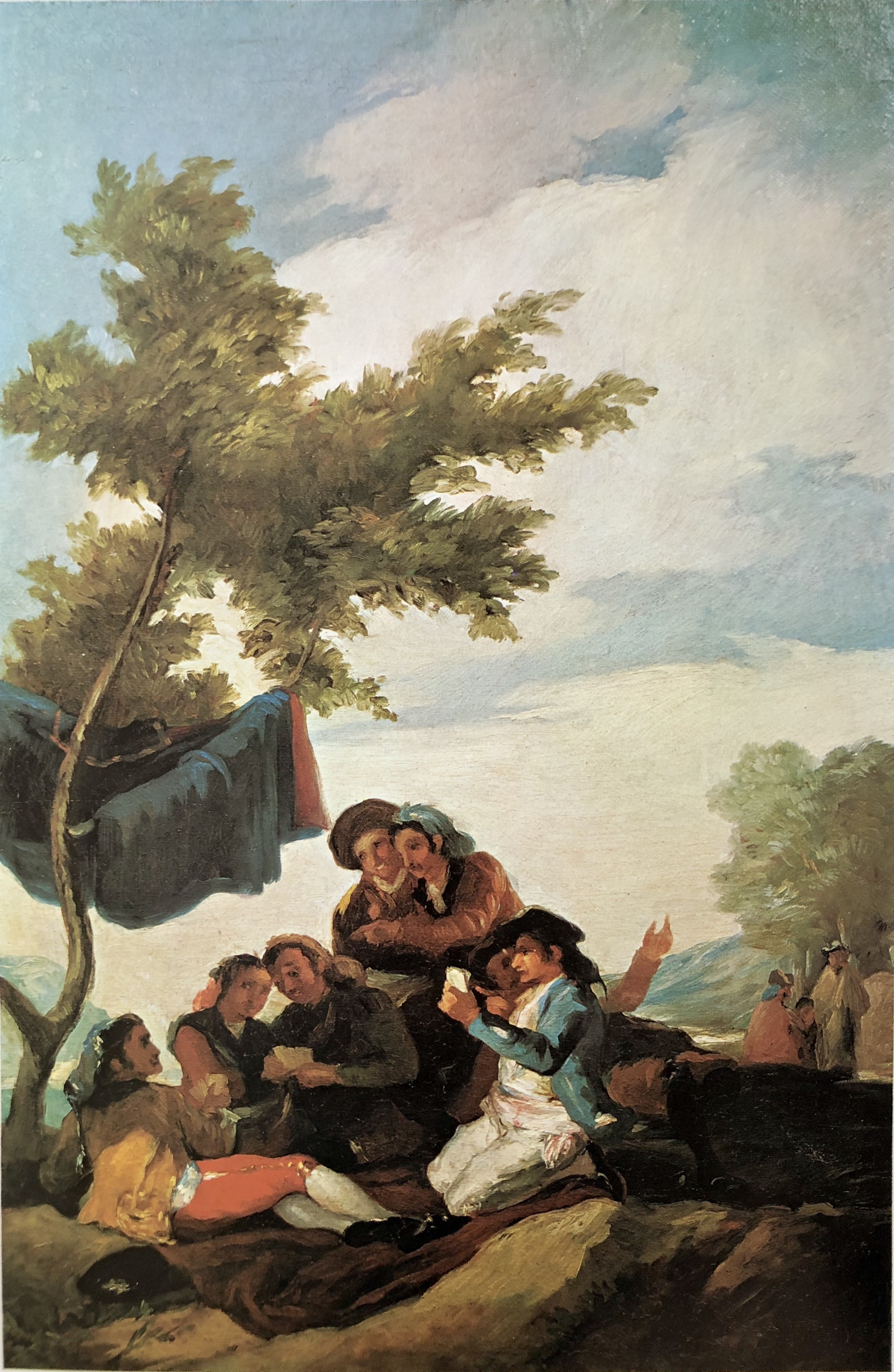
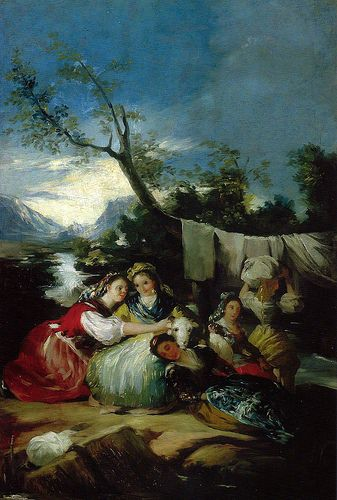
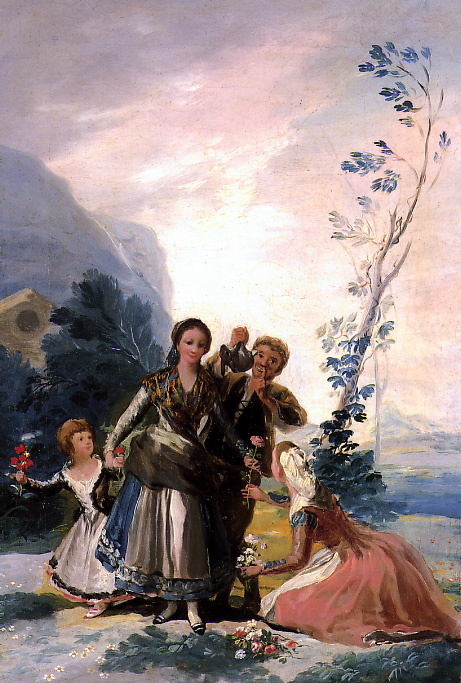
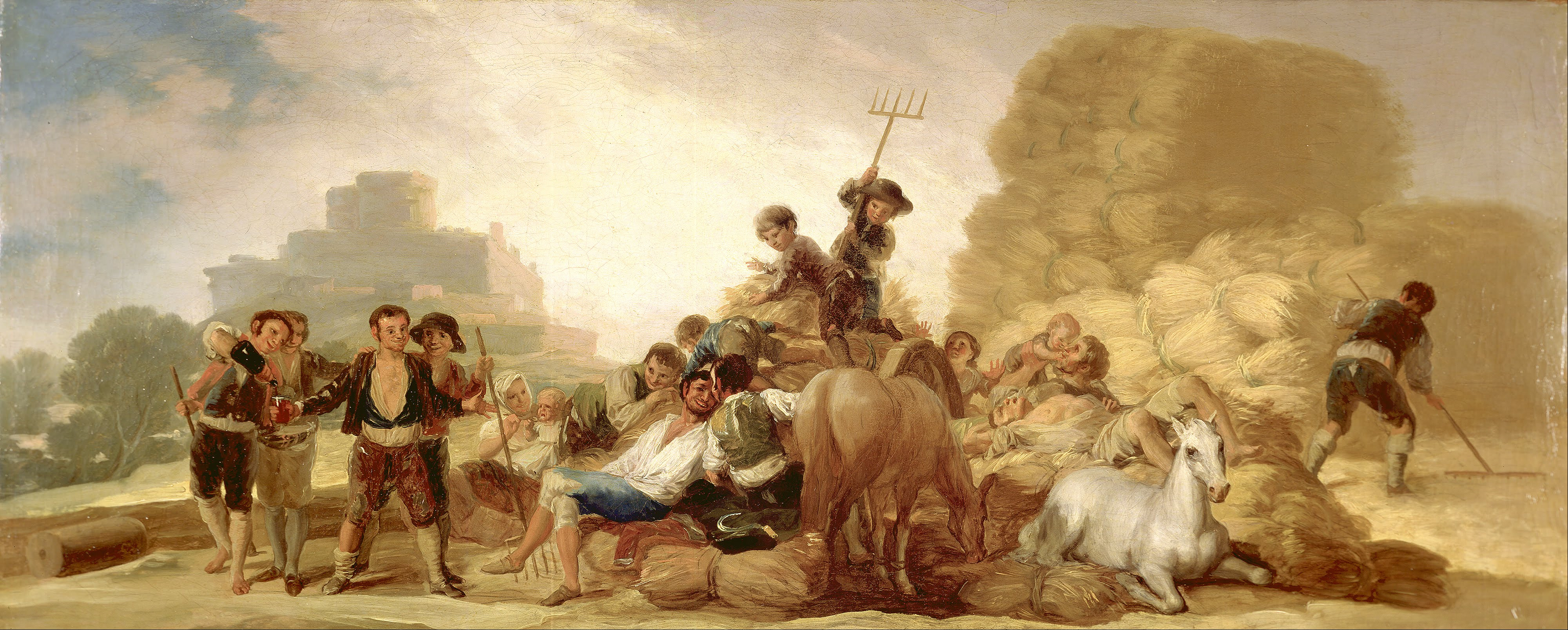
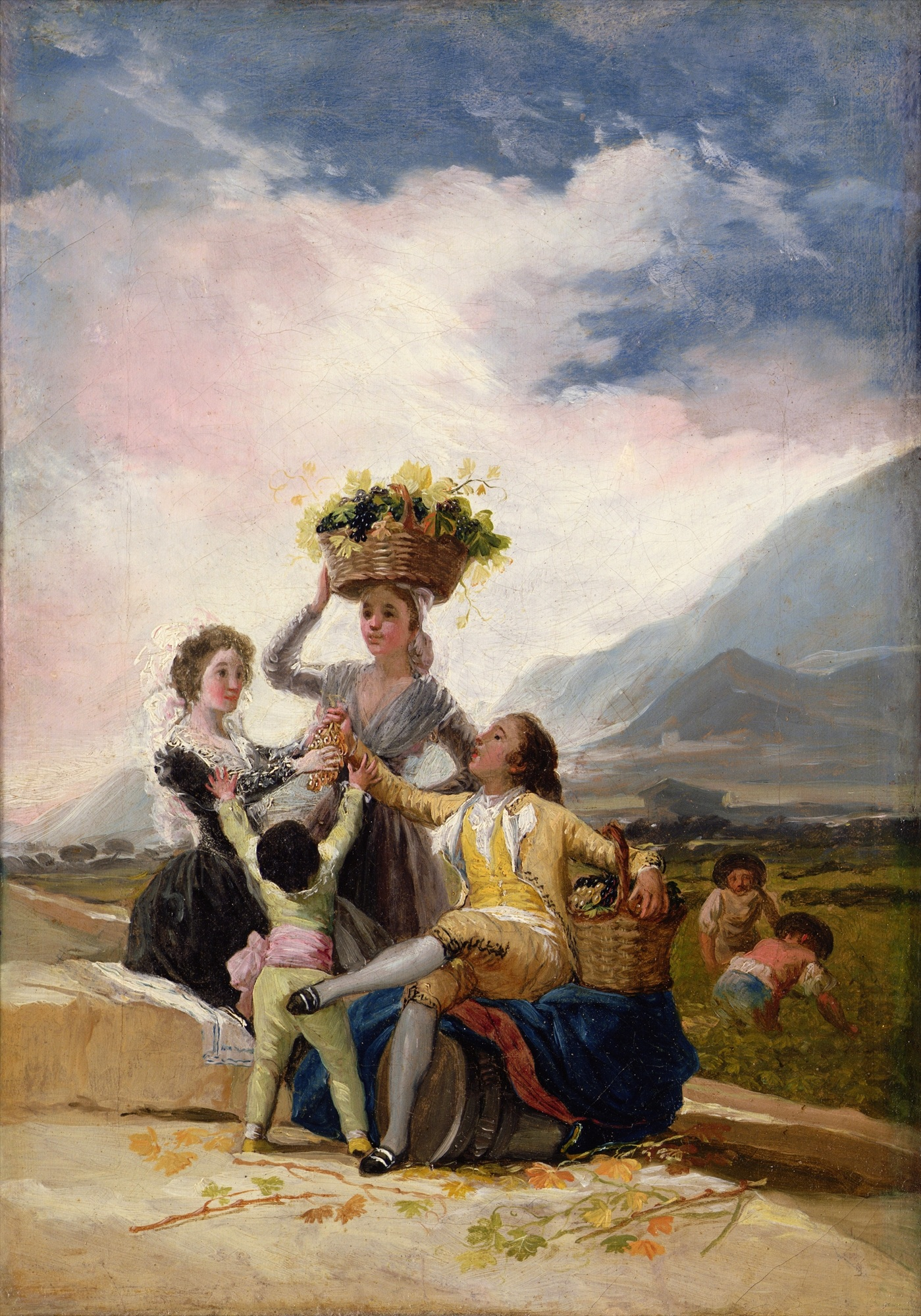
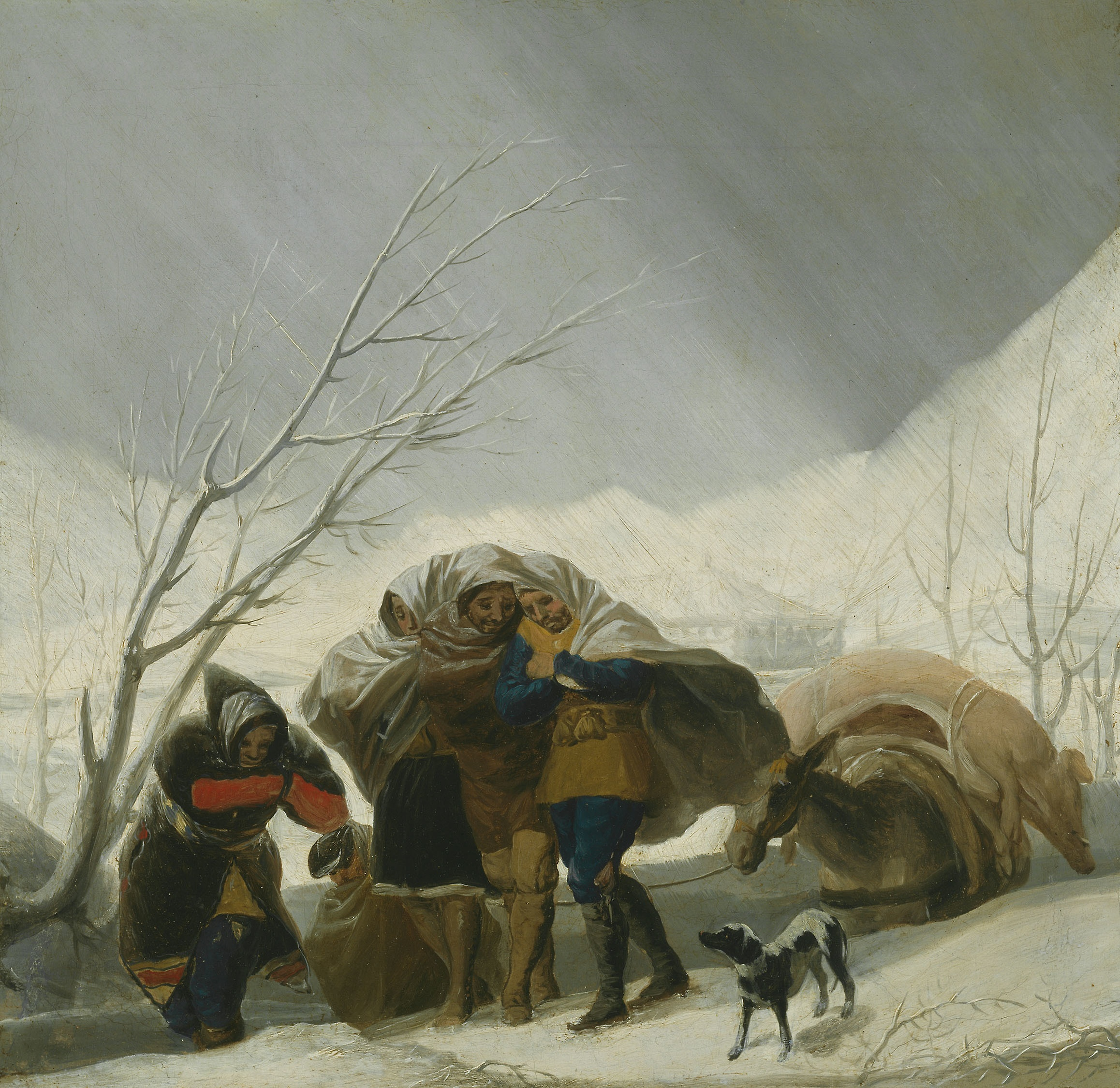
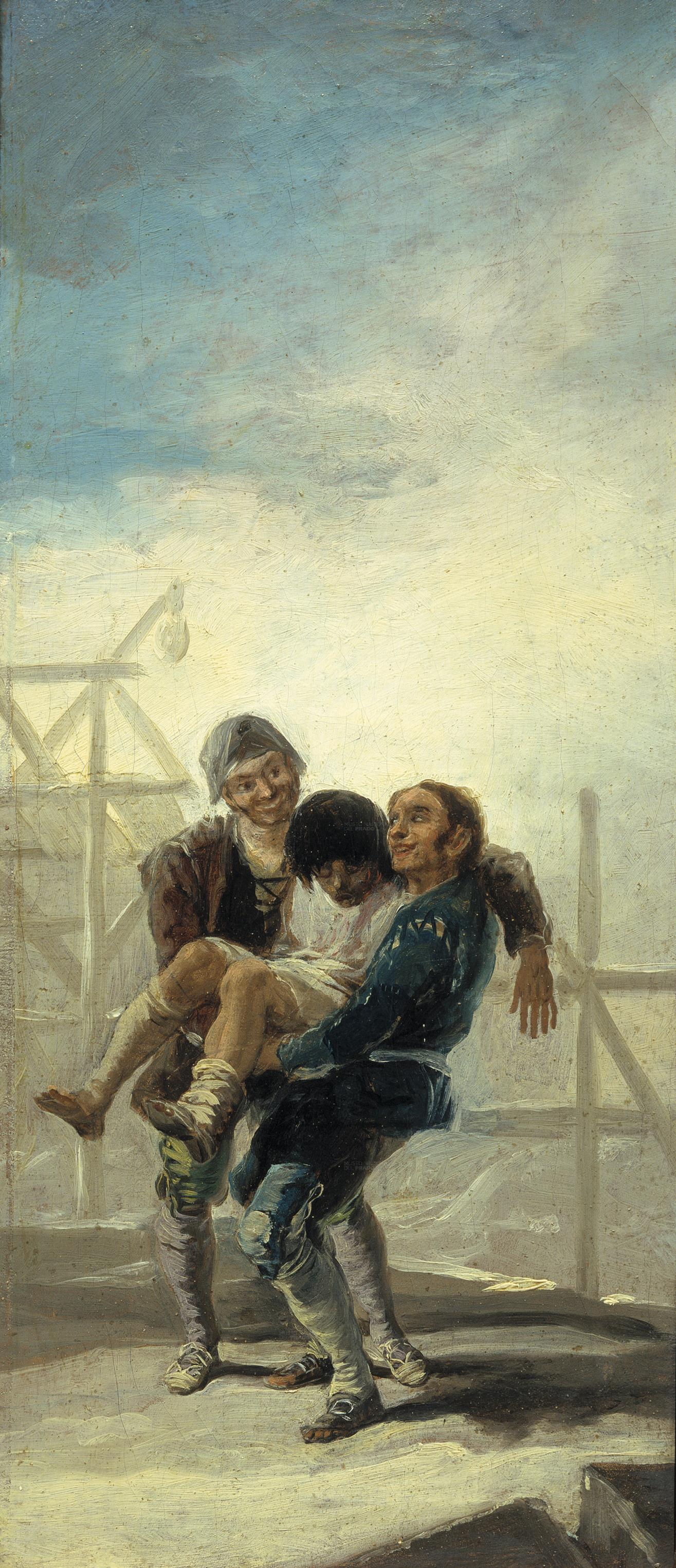
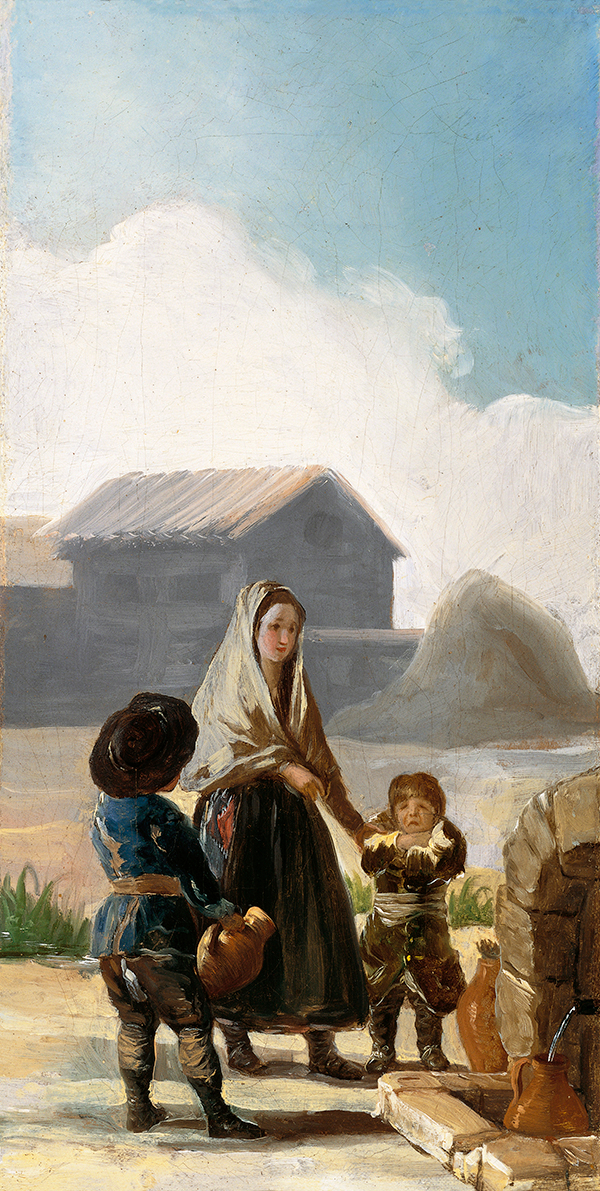
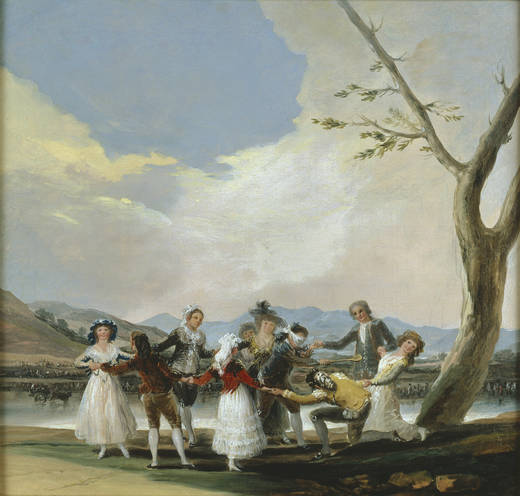
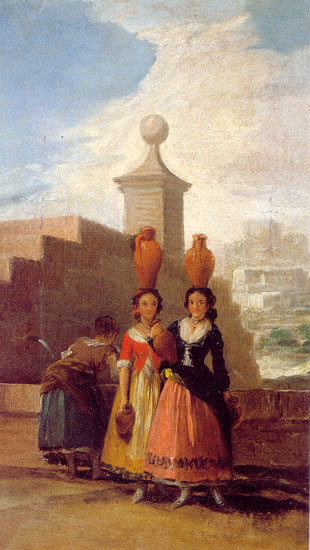
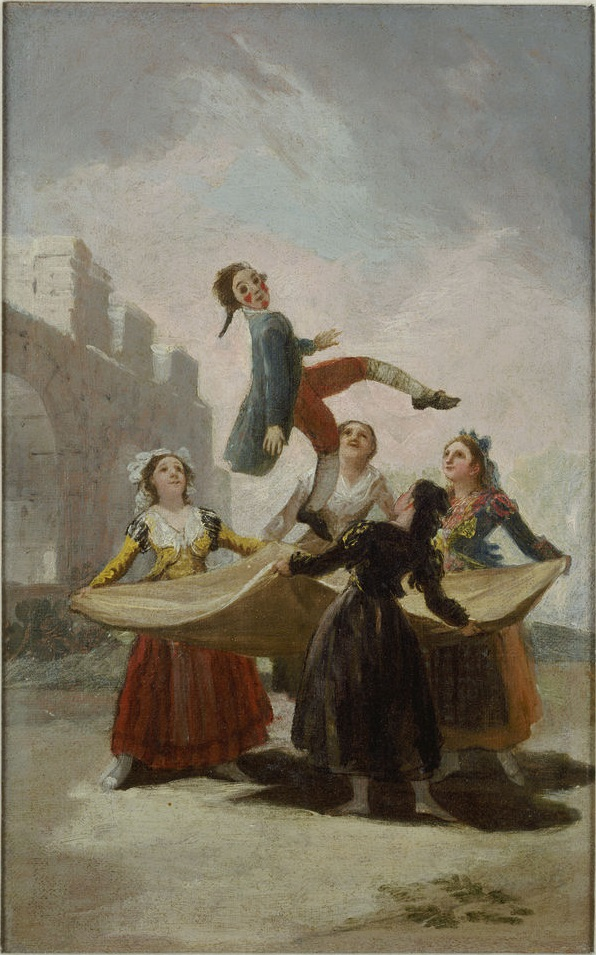
Tapestry	Spanish title	Date	Dimensions	Museum
	Niños jugando a soldados	1775	39 × 28 cm	Colección Yanduri (Sevilla)
	El ciego de la guitarra	1778	-	Biblioteca Nacional (Madrid)
	Los jugadores de naipes	c. 1777	86.5 × 59 cm	Winterthur Collection (Winterthur)
	Las lavanderas	1779	86.5 × 59 cm	Winterthur Collection (Winterthur)
	La primavera	1786–1787	35 × 24 cm	Colección de Montellano (Madrid)
	La trilla	1786–1787	34 × 76 cm	Museo Lázaro Galdiano (Madrid)
	The Grape Harvest	1786	34 × 24.2 cm	Clark Art Institute (Williamstown)
	El invierno	1786–1787	34.3 × 36.6 cm	Art Institute of Chicago (Chicago)
	El albañil borracho	1786	35 × 15 cm	Museo del Prado
	Mujer y dos niños junto a una fuente	1786–1787	18.5 × 3.5 cm	Thyssen-Bornemisza Museum (Madrid)
	La gallina ciega	1788–1789	18.5 × 3.5 cm	Museo del Prado
	Mozas del cántaro	1791	34 × 21 cm	Colección Paloma McCrohon (Madrid)
	El pelele	1791	35.6 × 23.2 cm	Hammer Museum (Los Angeles)

== See also ==
- Francisco Goya's tapestry cartoons
- List of works by Francisco Goya

== Bibliography ==
- Bozal, Valeriano. Francisco Goya, vida y obra, Madrid, Tf, 2005, 2 vols. (Aficiones, 5-6). ISBN 978-84-96209-39-8.
- Gassier, Pierre and Juliet Wilson–Bareau. Vida y obra de Francisco Goya, Barcelona, Juventud. ISBN 84-261-5682-7.
- Glendinning, Nigel. Francisco de Goya, Madrid, Arlanza, Biblioteca «Descubrir el Arte», 2005. ISBN 84-95503-40-9.
- Hagen, Rose-Marie & Hagen, Rainer. Francisco Goya, 1746-1828. Taschen, 2003. ISBN 3-8228-1823-2
- Hughes, Robert. Goya. New York: Alfred A. Knopf, 2004. ISBN 0-394-58028-1
- Mena Márquez, Manuela de. Goya: guía de sala, Madrid, Tf, 2008. ISBN 978-84-95452-46-7.
- Tomlinson, Janis A. Francisco de Goya: los cartones para tapices y los comienzos de su carrera en la Corte de Madrid, Madrid, Cátedra, 1993. ISBN 84-376-1192-X.
- Francisco Goya. Kent: Grange Books, 2004. ISBN 1-84013-662-6
