= Index of painting-related articles =

This is an alphabetical index of articles related to painting.

== A ==
- Abstract art
- Abstract expressionism
- Abstract illusionism
- Abstract impressionism
- Abstraction-Création
- Academic art
- Académie des Beaux-Arts
- Accidental damage of art
- Accidentalism
- Acrylic paint
- Acrylic painting techniques
- Action painting
- Aeropittura
- Afrasiab painting
- Aging
- Ainu genre painting
- Airbrush
- Akita ranga
- Algorithmic art
- Al-Qatt Al-Asiri
- All-over painting
- Altarpiece
- Amsterdam Impressionism
- Ancients
- Andokides painter
- Animal-made art
- Animalier
- Antwerp Mannerism
- Antwerp school
- Apulian vase painting
- Aquarelle
- Arabic miniature
- Architectural painting
- Argentine painting
- Argive vase painting
- Art conservation and restoration
- Art criticism
- Art dealer
- Art of the United Kingdom
- Art of El Greco
- Arte Povera
- Artist
- Ashcan School
- Assemblage
- Astuvansalmi rock paintings
- Atelier
- Atmospheric perspective
- Authenticity in art
- Automatistes

== B ==
- Bad Painting
- Bahi rock paintings
- Balinese art
- Bamboccianti
- Bamboo painting
- Barbizon school
- Bark painting
- Baroque painting
- Bavarian State Painting Collections
- Bengal School of Art
- Bentvueghels
- Bergen school
- Bikaner style of painting
- Bilingual vase painting
- Binder
- Bird-and-flower painting
- Black-figure pottery
- Boeotian vase painting
- Bodegón
- Body painting
- Bolognese school
- Boston Expressionism
- Boston school
- Brazilian painting
- Brunaille
- Buon fresco
- Byzantine art

== C ==
- Ca' Dolfin Tiepolos
- Cabinet painting
- Caeretan hydria
- California Impressionism
- California Scene Painting
- Campanian vase painting
- Cangiante
- Canvas
- Capriccio
- Caravaggisti
- Carnation
- Casein paint
- Catalogue raisonné
- Catholic art
- Cave painting
- Cave paintings in India
- Caverna da Pedra Pintada
- Cheriyal scroll painting
- Chiaroscuro
- China painting
- Chinese painting
- Chinese porcelain in European painting
- Chinsō
- Cityscape
- Classical Realism
- Cloisonnism
- Cloudscape
- Cobweb painting
- Collage
- Color
- Color field
- Color realism
- Color theory (hue, tint, tone, value)
- Coloring book
- Colourist painting
- Combine painting
- Company style
- Composition
- Conservation and restoration of ancient Greek pottery
- Conservation and restoration of cultural heritage
- Conservation and restoration of frescos
- Conservation and restoration of painting frames
- Conservation and restoration of paintings
- Conservation and restoration of panel paintings
- Conservation and restoration of Pompeian frescoes
- Conservation-restoration of Leonardo da Vinci's The Last Supper
- Contemporary British Painting
- Costumbrismo
- Court painter
- Cradling
- Craquelure
- Crayon
- Cretan school
- Crucifixion in the arts
- Crystal Cubism
- Cubism
- Cubo-Futurism
- Cycladic vase painting
- Cynical realism
- Czech Cubism

== D ==
- Dada
- Danube school
- Deccan painting
- Decorative Impressionism
- Degenerate art
- Delft school
- Der Blaue Reiter
- Detachment of wall paintings
- Die Brücke
- Digital painting
- Diptych
- Distemper (paint)
- Divisionism
- Đông Hồ painting
- Donor portrait
- Doom paintings
- Double-sided painting
- Drawdown card
- Drawing
- Dress coat painting
- Drip painting
- Drybrush
- Drying oil
- Düsseldorf school of painting
- Dutch and Flemish Renaissance painting
- Dutch art
- Dutch Gift
- Dutch Golden Age painting

== E ==
- E-awase
- Eaismo
- Early Netherlandish painting
- Easel
- East Greek vase painting
- Eclecticism in art
- Edinburgh school
- Egg tempera
- Elements of art
- Emakimono
- En plein air
- Encaustic painting
- Ensō
- Etruscan vase painting
- Etude in Leningrad painting of 1940-1980s
- Euboean vase painting
- Ex-voto
- Exposition des primitifs flamands à Bruges
- Expressionism

== F ==
- Fairy painting
- Fat over lean
- Fauvism
- Faux painting
- Fayum mummy portraits
- Feast of the Gods
- Fedoskino miniature
- Fête galante
- Figura serpentinata
- Figuration Libre
- Figurative art
- Figure drawing
- Figure painting
- Figure painting (hobby)
- Figure study
- Fijnschilder
- Fine Art of Leningrad
- Fingerpaint
- Flatness
- Flemish Baroque painting
- Flemish Expressionism
- Flemish painting
- Folly (allegory)
- Fore-edge painting
- Fourth dimension in art
- Freehand brush work
- Free Secession
- French standard sizes for oil paintings
- Fresco
- Fresco-secco
- Frottage
- Fugitive pigment
- Futurist Painting: Technical Manifesto

== G ==
- Gambier Parry process
- Generación de la Ruptura
- Genre painting
- Geometric abstraction
- Gesso
- Giornata
- Glair
- Glasgow school
- Glaze
- Glue-size
- Gnathia vases
- Gongbi
- Gorodets painting
- Gothic art
- Gouache
- Grand manner
- Grisaille
- Group of Seven
- Gruppo dei Sei

== H ==
- Haboku
- Hagenbund
- Hague school
- Haiga
- Handscroll
- Hanging scroll
- Hanshan and Shide
- Hara school of painters
- Hard-edge painting
- Hasegawa school
- Heaven Style painting
- Heidelberg school
- Hierarchy of genres
- Historic paint analysis
- History of modern Turkish painting
- History of painting
- History painting
- Hudson River School
- Hyperrealism

== I ==
- Iconography
- Illusionism
- Illusionistic ceiling painting
- Illustration
- Impasto
- Impressionism
- Imprimatura
- Incised painting
- Indian painting
- Indigenous Australian art
- Informalism
- Ink
- Ink wash painting
- Inscape
- Intimism
- Intonaco
- Ionic vase painting
- Italian Baroque art
- Italian Renaissance painting
- Italian Rococo art

== J ==
- Japanese painting

== K ==
- Kaigetsudō school
- Kakemono
- Kalighat painting
- Kangra painting
- Kanō school
- Katsukawa school
- Keim's process
- Kerala mural painting
- Kerch style
- Kinetic Pointillism
- Konstnärsförbundet
- Konstnärsförbundets skola
- Korean painting
- Kylix
- Kyoto school

== L ==
- Laconian vase painting
- Lacquer painting
- Landscape painting
- Landscape painting in Scotland
- Leaf painting
- Ledger art
- Leningrad painting of 1950-1980s (Saint Petersburg, 1994)
- Leningrad School of Painting
- Les Nabis
- Letras y figuras
- Licked finish
- Light painting
- Line
- Lining of paintings
- Live painting
- Local color
- Lost artworks
- Lüftlmalerei
- Lucan portrait of Leonardo da Vinci
- Lucanian vase painting
- Luminism (Impressionism)
- Lyrical abstraction

== M ==
- Macchiaioli
- Madhubani art
- Madonna
- Mannerism
- Mannerists
- Marine art
- Marouflage
- Masking
- Massurrealism
- Mastic
- Matte painting
- Maulstick
- May (painting)
- Megilp
- Merry company
- Metaphysical art
- Mexican muralism
- Michelangelo and the Medici
- Military art
- Mineral painting
- Mineral spirits
- Miniature art
- Minimalism
- Mischtechnik
- Mise en abyme
- Mixed media
- Model
- Modern art
- Modern European ink painting
- Modern expressionism
- Modern Indian painting
- Modernism
- Modular art
- Mogu
- Rhodian vase painting
- Monochrome painting
- Motif
- Mouth and foot painting
- Mughal painting
- Mural
- Mural Paintings from the Herrera Chapel
- Mural paintings of the conquest of Majorca
- Mstyora miniature
- Mysore painting

== N ==
- Naïve art
- Namepiece
- Nanga
- Nanpin school
- Narrative art
- Nazarene movement
- Ndebele house painting
- Neoclassicism
- Neo-expressionism
- Neo-Fauvism
- Neo-figurative art
- Neo-Impressionism
- Neo-minimalism
- Neo-pop
- Neo-primitivism
- Nepalese painting
- New European Painting
- New Leipzig School
- Night in paintings (Eastern art)
- Night in paintings (Western art)
- Nihonga
- Nikuhitsu-ga
- Nirmal paintings
- Nise-e
- Nishiki-e
- Nocturne (painting)
- Northern Mannerism
- Norwich School of painters
- Nouveau réalisme
- Novgorod school
- Nuagisme
- Nude

== O ==
- Objective abstraction
- Ogoe
- Oil on copper
- Oil paint
- Oil painting
- Oil painting reproduction
- Oil pastel
- Oil sketch
- Olot school
- Op art
- Oriental carpets in Renaissance painting
- Orientalism
- Orientalizing period
- Orphism
- Overdoor
- Overpainting

== P ==
- Paestan vase painting
- Pahari painting
- Paint
- Paintbrush
- Paint by number
- Painterliness
- Painterly
- Painterwork
- Painting
- Painting and Patronage
- Painting in Space
- Painting in the Americas before European colonization
- Painting of Lady Tjepu
- Paintings attributed to Caravaggio
- Paintings by Adolf Hitler
- Paintings conservator
- Paintings from Arlanza
- Paintings from El Burgal
- Paintings of 1940-1990s: the Leningrad School
- Paintings of Amsterdam by Vincent van Gogh
- Paintings on masonite
- Palette
- Panel painting
- Papier collé
- Paris Salon
- Pastel
- Palette
- Palette knife
- Panorama
- Panoramic painting
- Passionism
- Patna School of Painting
- Pen painting
- Pencil crayon
- Pendant painting
- Pentimento
- Persian miniature
- Perspective
- Petrykivka painting
- Phad painting
- Photorealism
- Picasso's African Period
- Picasso's Blue Period
- Picasso's Rose Period
- Picture frame
- Pigment
- Pinxit
- Pithora
- Pitsa panels
- Plafond
- Plains hide painting
- Plastic arts
- Plasticiens
- Pointillism
- Polyptych
- Pompeian Styles
- Pont-Aven School
- Pop art
- Portrait
- Portrait miniature
- Portrait painting
- Portrait painting in Scotland
- Portraits by Vincent van Gogh
- Portraits of Shakespeare
- Portuguese contemporary art
- Post-Impressionism
- Post-painterly abstraction
- Poster paint
- Poussinists and Rubenists
- Precisionism
- Predella
- Pre-Raphaelite Brotherhood
- Prestezza
- Prime version
- Primer
- Primitivism
- Private collection
- Problem picture
- Pronkstilleven
- Prostitution in Impressionist painting
- Proto-Cubism
- Protoquadro
- Provenance
- Pulled string painting
- Purism

== Q ==
- Quadro riportato
- Quattrocento
- Quito School

== R ==
- Rag painting
- Ragamala paintings
- Rajput painting
- Raking light
- Rasa Renaissance
- Rayonism
- Realism (art movement)
- Realism (arts)
- Red-figure pottery
- Regionalism
- Renaissance art
- Renaissance in the Low Countries
- Repoussoir
- Restoration of the Sistine Chapel frescoes
- Retablo
- Reverse glass painting
- Reverse perspective
- Rhodian vase painting
- Rinpa school
- Rissverklebung
- Rock art of the Iberian Mediterranean Basin
- Roman wall painting (200 BC–AD 79)
- Romanesque art
- Romanism
- Renaissance art
- Rococo
- Rosemåling
- Rückenfigur
- Rule of thirds
- Russian avant-garde
- Russian Futurism
- Russian icons
- Russian lacquer art
- Russian symbolism

== S ==
- Sacra conversazione
- Salon d'Automne
- Salon des Refusés
- Samian vase painting
- Sandpainting
- Saponification
- Saura painting
- Scenic painting
- School of Ferrara
- School of Fontainebleau
- Screen painting
- Scottish Colourists
- Scottish Renaissance painted ceilings
- Scottish genre art
- Section d'Or
- Self-portrait
- Self-portraits by Rembrandt
- Septych
- Sfumato
- Sgraffito
- Shading
- Shan shui
- Shaped canvas
- Shekhawati painting
- Shigajiku
- Shijō school
- Sienese School
- Sign painting
- Silk painting
- Sistine Chapel ceiling
- Six principles of Chinese painting
- Sketch
- Sketchbook
- Social realism
- Socialist realism
- Société des Artistes Indépendants
- Solvent
- Southern School
- Soviet sale of Hermitage paintings
- Spalliera
- Spanish art
- Spanish Eclecticism
- Spatial organization
- Spatialism
- Speed painting
- Spray painting
- Spring exhibition (Leningrad, 1969)
- Staffage
- Still life
- Still life paintings by Vincent van Gogh (Netherlands)
- Still life paintings by Vincent van Gogh (Paris)
- Still life paintings from the Netherlands, 1550-1720
- Strainer bar
- Street painting
- Stretcher bar
- Stroganov school
- Stuckism
- Study
- Style
- Style Louis XIV
- Sugar painting
- Suprematism
- Surrealism
- Surrealist automatism
- Synchromism
- Synthetism

== T ==
- Tachisme
- Tang dynasty painting
- Tarashikomi
- Tempera
- Tenebrism
- Thanjavur painting
- Thangka
- The Eight
- Theft of The Weeping Woman from the National Gallery of Victoria
- Themes in Italian Renaissance painting
- Theorem stencil
- Theory of painting
- Thessalian vase painting
- Three-phase firing
- Tibetan Buddhist wall paintings
- Tingatinga
- Tints and shades
- Tipos del País
- Toba-e
- Tobacco and art
- Tole painting
- Tonalism
- Tondo
- Topographical tradition
- Torii school
- Tosa school
- Transfer of panel paintings
- Triptych
- Trompe-l'œil
- Tronie
- Troubadour style
- Tumlehed rock painting
- Trump
- Tunisian collaborative painting
- Turpentine

== U ==
- Ukiyo-e
- Ukrainian avant-garde
- Underdrawing
- Underpainting
- Universal Flowering
- Utrecht Caravaggism

== V ==
- Vandalism of art
- Vanitas
- Varnish
- Veduta
- Velvet painting
- Venetian painting
- Venetian Renaissance
- Verdaccio
- Verdaille
- Verismo
- Victorian painting
- Visage Painting and the Human Face in 20th Century Art
- Visual arts

== W ==
- Wall Paintings of Thera
- Wall painting in Turkey
- Warli painting
- Wash
- Wasli
- Watercolor painting
- Watercolor paper
- Western painting
- Wet-on-wet
- 20th-century Western painting
- White ground technique
- Working in layers
- World landscape
- Wǔ Xíng painting

== Y ==
- Yamato-e
- Yōga
- Young British Artists

== Z ==
- Zhe school
- Zhostovo painting
- The Zouave

== Lists ==
- Art movements
- Early Netherlandish painters
- Painters by name
- Painters by nationality
- Major paintings by Masaccio
- Most expensive paintings
  - by living artists
- National Treasures of Japan
- Paintings by Frédéric Bazille
- Paintings by Hieronymus Bosch
- Paintings by Gustave Caillebotte
- Paintings by Caravaggio
- Paintings by Paul Cézanne
- Paintings by Albrecht Dürer
- Paintings by Paul Gauguin
- Paintings by Frans Hals
- Paintings by Gustav Klimt
- Paintings by Édouard Manet
- Paintings by Edvard Munch
- Paintings by Camille Pissarro
- Paintings by Nicolas Poussin
- Paintings by Raphael
- Paintings by Rembrandt
- Paintings by Pierre-Auguste Renoir
- Paintings by Alfred Sisley
- Paintings by Johannes Vermeer
- Paintings by James McNeill Whistler
- Stolen paintings
- Stone Age art
- Works by Michelangelo
- Works by Henri Matisse
- Works by Claude Monet
- Works by Titian
- Works by Vincent van Gogh
- Works by Diego Velázquez

== Category ==
- Category:Painting

== See also ==
- Outline of painting
- Outline of painting history
