= Accidentalism =

Accidentalism may refer to:

- Accidentalism and catastrophism, two differing ideologies in Spain in the inter-war period
- Accidentalism (philosophy), the position that events can succeed one another haphazardly or by chance
- Accidentalism (painting), the effect produced by accidental lights
- Accidentalism (art), a 1980s–1990s art movement

.
