= Interior of a Mosque =

Painting by Jean-Léon Gérôme

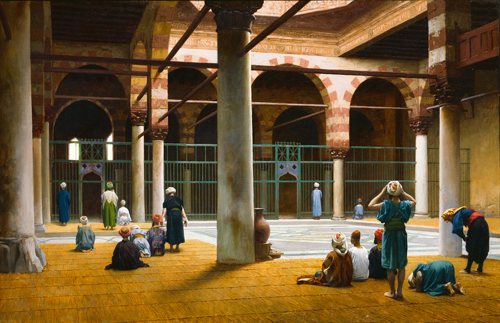
- Artist: Jean-Léon Gérôme
- Year: 1890s
- Medium: oil on canvas
- Dimensions: 59.4 cm × 89.9 cm (23.4 in × 35.4 in)
- Location: Memorial Art Gallery, Rochester, NY

Interior of a Mosque is an oil painting on canvas by the French painter Jean-Léon Gérôme, begun in 1890 and finished by 1899. It measures 23 3/8 inches by 35 3/8 inches. It is now in the Memorial Art Gallery in Rochester, New York and belongs to the Hiram Sibley Collection. Hiram Sibley was a philanthropist and art collector in the 19th century, whose daughter, Emily Sibley, actually founded the Memorial Art Gallery. He donated his art collection to the MAG and it has remained ever since. Gérôme is a very well-known name associated with the beginnings of the Orientalist art movement. He is responsible for some of the most widely debated depictions of Orientalism in the context of art, which is loosely defined as depictions or imitations of Eastern culture without deep understanding or knowledge. These shallow understandings of Eastern culture were developed and defined alongside the industrialization of the Western World during the 19th century.

== Analysis ==
This work depicts worshipers in a mosque who are all viewed from the back. The style of painting is realistic and characterized by a smooth licked finish. The composition features vertical and horizontal lines that create the interior. The eye line of the viewer is at the same height as the other figures in the work, which makes the viewer feel like an observer in the mosque. Some of the figures present in the work in are kneeling in positions of prayer while others are standing. Their faces are not visible. All the figures wear turbans. Natural light comes from a hole in the ceiling and creates shadows on the ground below, cast by both the figures and the tall supports that connect to the ceiling. The figures are much smaller compared to the surrounding space in order to convey the grandeur of the structure.

There are some patterns on the arches of the mosque, but nothing is colored unnaturally. The mosque is a combination of browns, tans and yellows. There is also a green gate that can be seen further back in the space. The mood is serene and peaceful. A work that can be compared to Interior of a Mosque that showcases blatant Orientalist thinking is The Snake Charmer. This work depicts a naked woman wrapped in a snake while being watched by others. The work also includes shimmering, intricate blue and silver tiles in the background that Edward Said describes to be along the lines of "Western Orientalists claiming to know and love better than decadent locals did".

== History of the work ==
In 1852, Gérôme was commissioned by the government to create a large-scale Augustan allegory. This work was meant to impress Napoleon III at the 1855 World's Fair. Thus, in search of inspiration, he sets off to Eastern Europe. He travelled along the Danube through the Balkans to Constantinople while furiously sketching along the way. Although very brief, it was this trip that would spark a lifelong interest in the culture/society of the Middle East. In 1856, he organized a much longer trip to Egypt that lasted 8 months. Over the course of his remaining life, he would make another half dozen trips to Eastern Europe between 1862 and 1880. In 1893, Gérôme was named as the honorary president of Société des Peintres Orientalistes Français. This group was formed to promote Orientalist painting and the travel of French artists such as Gérôme to the Middle and Far East.

== Orientalism: short background ==
The geographic location where Orientalism was most notably present includes North Africa, West Asia, South Asia, East Asia, Southeast Asia, and Central Asia. Orientalism became a term that meant the study and representation of the Eastern world and its culture by Western scholars, artists and writers. This led to depictions of Eastern cultures that were romanticized, exoticized or oversimplified. This was all a clear reflection of extreme Western bias. It is also important to remember that the term "orient" is extremely outdated as it represents colonial/Eurocentric attitudes. Orientalism was considered a branch of French Academic painting, which is where Gérôme was mostly present. Some other notable artists that were remembered as leading figures in the movement alongside Gérôme included Eugène Delacroix and Jean-Auguste-Dominique Ingres. In 1978, Edward Said wrote a book titled Orientalism, which provides some more context into why this movement was so harmful. Said argues that Western culture asserts superiority over Eastern culture. This, in turn, molds the Orient into a construct of the Western imagination. He states that France and England were the two main countries where the image of "the Orient" was restructured and refined. Said states, "to be an educated European is to be an Orientalist."

== Jean Léon Gérôme: short background ==
Jean Léon Gérôme debuted as an artist in 1847. He was a French painter and sculptor associated with the academic art establishment. Neoclassicism and Romanticism fusion could be used to describe his style of work, which emphasized historical, mythological and exotic scenes. He was appointed as a professor at École des Beaux-Arts, a highly regarded French art institution that had a profound influence on Western art, in 1863. This led to him becoming one of the most influential art teachers of the nineteenth century. In 1865, he ascended to a seat in the Institut de France, which is a prestigious French institution established to advance arts, sciences and humanities. In 1898, he was nominated as a grand officier, a rare distinction among French artists. Gérôme's work was met with critical hostility from famed art critics, including Theophile Gautier. Critics were highly judgmental of Gérôme's representation of historical subjects as they tended to warp and distort source material to play up art to an audience. Gérôme preferred "superficial imitation" over "profound expression". It is already worth mentioning that Gérôme is clearly very heavily associated with the idea of exoticizing his subjects.

== Colors and connection to the Koran ==
The painting utilizes bright colors such as vivid greens, blues and reds within the clothing of the figures. In the Islamic religion, each of these colors do have a significance. Green is said to symbolize a paradise and is also associated with the Prophet Muhammed. It is cited in the Koran as having two different meanings. The first being that green is the color used to describe the clothing worn by believers in heaven as well as the color of the furniture. The second is lush and fruitful lands. It is a sacred color also connected to renewal and symbolizing life. Blue is considered a more protective color. It represents peace and tranquility, as well as spirituality and the heavens. A different academic journal writes that blue has a negative connotation and is actually associated with the eyes of sinners. This could be connected to the fact that Gérôme was actively participating in the notion of being Orientalist through art. He used colors in his work without a deeper understanding of what they represent in the Islamic culture. When it comes to red it is mentioned in the Koran only one time. It is described in the context of colors created by God and mountains. It is also representative of blood and war. It has both positive and negative connotations associated with it. Further analyzing, red is also connected to gender differentiation as some hues of red were prohibited for men to wear. Simply, red is meant to symbolize power and strength as well as love. The surrounding area that is the actual structure of the mosque is painted with browns, tans and yellows.
