= Outline of painting history =

Overview of and topical guide to painting history

The following outline is provided as an overview of and topical guide to the history of painting:

The history of painting reaches back in time to artifacts and artwork created by pre-historic artists, and spans all cultures. It represents a continuous, though periodically disrupted, tradition from Antiquity. Across cultures, continents, and millennia, the history of painting consists of an ongoing river of creativity that continues into the 21st century. Until the early 20th century it relied primarily on representational, religious and classical motifs, after which time more purely abstract and conceptual approaches gained favor.

Developments in Eastern painting historically parallel those in Western painting, in general, a few centuries earlier. African art, Jewish art, Islamic art, Indonesian art, Indian art, Chinese art, and Japanese art each had significant influence on Western art, and vice versa.

== Prehistoric painting ==
- Pre-historic art
- Cave painting
- Petroglyph
- Pictogram
- List of Stone Age art

== Ancient painting ==
- Art of Ancient Egypt
- Knossos
- Mycenaean Greece
- Pottery of ancient Greece
- Roman art
- Pompeian Styles
- Fayum mummy portraits
- Early Christian art and architecture

== History of western painting ==
=== Medieval painting ===
- Medieval art
- Byzantine art
  - Icon
- Insular art
- Carolingian art
- Ottonian art
- Romanesque art
- Gothic art
- Early Netherlandish painting
- Illuminated manuscript
- Miniature (illuminated manuscript)
- Panel painting

=== Painting during the Renaissance ===
- Early Renaissance painting
- Italian Renaissance painting
- Northern European Renaissance painting
- Artists of the Tudor court
- High Renaissance painting
- Mannerism

=== Baroque painting ===
- Baroque painting

=== 18th-century painting ===
- Rococo
- Neoclassicism

=== 19th-century painting ===
- Romanticism
- Academic art
- Realism
- Naturalism (art)
- Hudson River School
- Luminism
- Impressionism
- Pre-Raphaelites
- Symbolism
- Post-Impressionism
- Neo-Impressionism
- Pointillism
- Divisionism
- Art Nouveau

=== 20th-century painting ===
This list is in random order. Date given is for the start of the style or movement.

- Fauvism (Les Fauves) 1905
- Cubism 1907
- Jack of Diamonds 1910
- Orphism
- Synchromism 1912
- Dada
- Surrealism
- Geometric abstraction
- Rayonnism
- Expressionism
- Abstract art
- Abstract Expressionism 1946
- Post-painterly abstraction 1964
- Neo-expressionism
- Art Deco
- Futurism 1909
- Op art
- Pop art
- Minimalism
- Art Brut / Folk Art / Naïve Art / Outsider Art
- Suprematism 1913
- Vorticism 1914
- Tachism
- Constructivism
- Russian avant-garde
- De Stijl (Neoplasticism)
- Neue Sachlichkeit
- American realism
- Social Realism
- Socialist realism
- Action painting
- Lyrical Abstraction 1967
- Monochrome painting
- Leningrad School
- Russian Non-Conformist
- Photorealism
- Concept art
- Neue Wilde
- Figuration Libre
- Graffiti
- Stuckism 1999

== See also ==
- Art history
- Western painting
- History of painting
- History of art
- Painting
- Index of painting-related articles
