= Cycladic vase painting =

Cycladic vase painting was a regional style of Greek vase painting, produced in the Cycladic islands.

Especially in its early and middle phases, the Geometric vase painting of the Cyclades was strongly influenced by Attic vase painting. In the late Geometric phase, there is evidence for workshops on Naxos, Thera, Paros and Melos that had developed their own stylistic forms in terms of material, vase shapes, and ornamental decoration. This was followed by a considerable duration of the Subgeometric style, before Orientalising vase painting became dominant. Once that had happened, floral and other ornaments became very popular. There was experimentation with polychrome effects (adding red and white paint), and to a more limited extent with figural motifs (animals and humans). Influences came from Attica and East Greece, rather than from the actual centre of the orientalising style, Corinth.

In the early 7th century BC, several highly innovative groups of potters/painters were active in the Cyclades. These were the Ad Group the Linear Island Group and the Heraldic Group. It is not clear where their production centre or centres were located, scholarly discussion revolves around Paros, Naxos and some smaller islands. Later, the so-called Melian Style became important; the name is misleading as it actually originated from Paros. This style shows a strong Corinthian influence and is characterised by daring ornamental and figural compositions covering the whole vase body. The workshop is best known for its broad and tall grave amphorae, painted with polychrome mythological scenes. Later, Andros produced alabastra in the black-figure technique, in relatively small quantities.

== Bibliography ==
- Thomas Mannack: Griechische Vasenmalerei. Eine Einführung. Theiss, Stuttgart 2002, p. 80f., 88-90. ISBN 3-8062-1743-2.
- Gerald P. Schaus: Geometrische Vasenmalerei, In: Der Neue Pauly, vol. 4 (1998), cols. 935-938
- Johannes Schwind: Orientalisierende Vasenmalerei, In: Der Neue Pauly, Vol. 9 (2000), cols. 23-26
