= Euboean vase painting =

Regional style of ancient Greek vase painting

Euboean vase painting was a regional style of ancient Greek vase painting, prevalent on the island of Euboea.

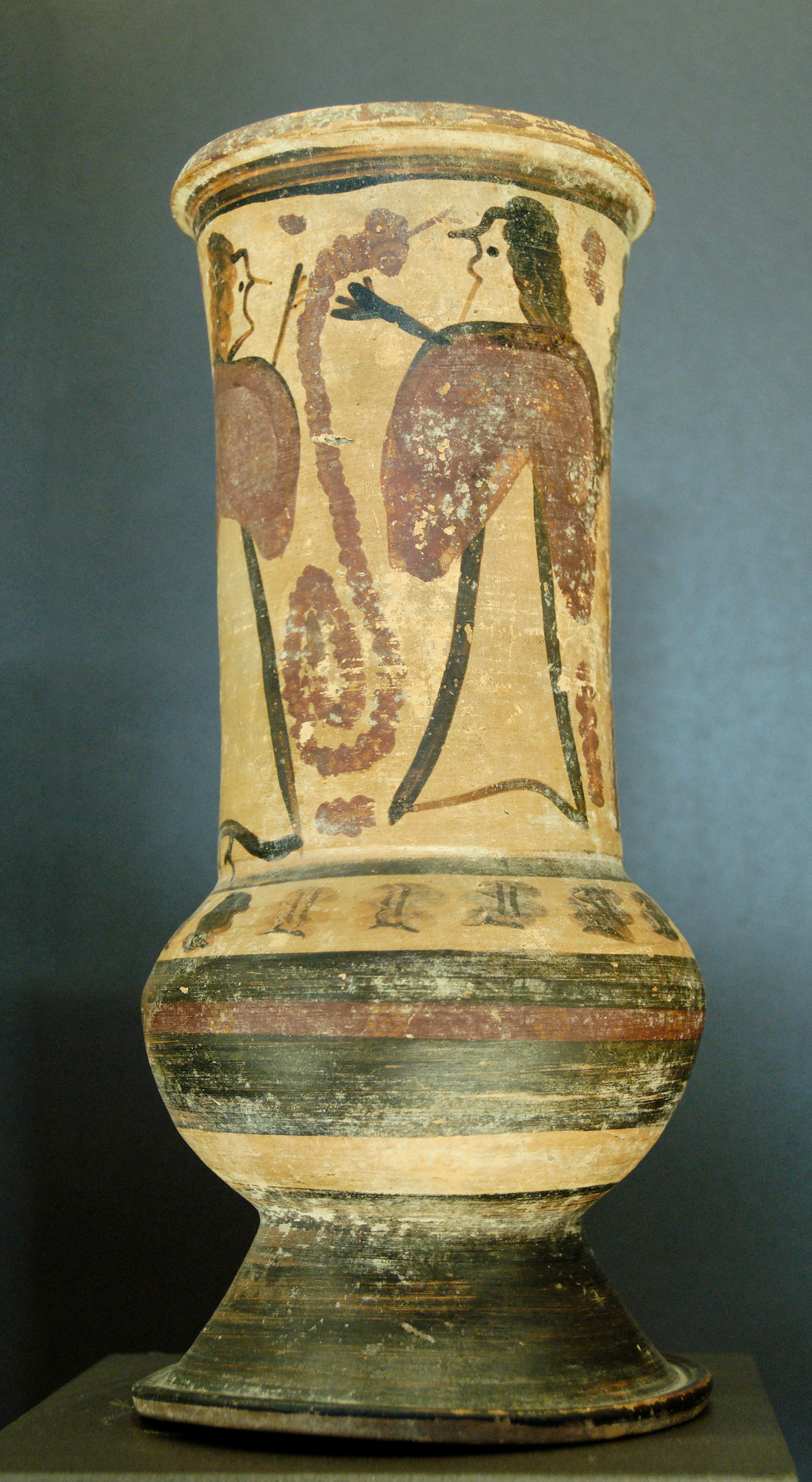
Two women on an orientalising jug, circa 625–600 BC. Paris: Louvre.

The Iron Age pottery of Euboea is subdivided into four phases Subgeometric (1125–1050 BC), Protogeometric (1050–900 BC), Subprotogeometric (900–750 BC) and Late Geometric (750–700 BC). The finds from the cemeteries of Toumba, Skoubris, and Palia, as well as from the settlements at Lefkandi and Xeropolis demonstrate the wealth of the island at that time. Although conditions changed several times, positively and negatively, afterwards, the pottery changed little. The Protogeometric style remained in existence until the mid-8th century. From about 825 BC onwards, an increased influence of Attic pottery is notable.

The Geometric vases of Euboea were products of high quality. The centres of production were at Eretria and Lefkandi. Some of the vessels were covered in a thick cream-coloured slip . Initially, the potter-painters followed Attic precedents, later also Corinthian ones. Around 750 BC, the Cesnola Painter, displaying strong Attic influence, was active. He introduced the Attic style of figural painting. Euboea was the only region to produce vessels decorated with suspended concentric semicircles. Also only here, white paint or slip were used to enclose or fill ornamental motifs. The Subgeometric style subsequently survived for a considerable duration; it took some time for the Orientalising style to become established. Once it had done so, floral and other ornaments were very popular. Some experimentation took place with added colours (red and white) and with figural motifs (animals and humans). The influences were more evidently Attic and East Greek than from the true centre of the orientalising style, Corinth.

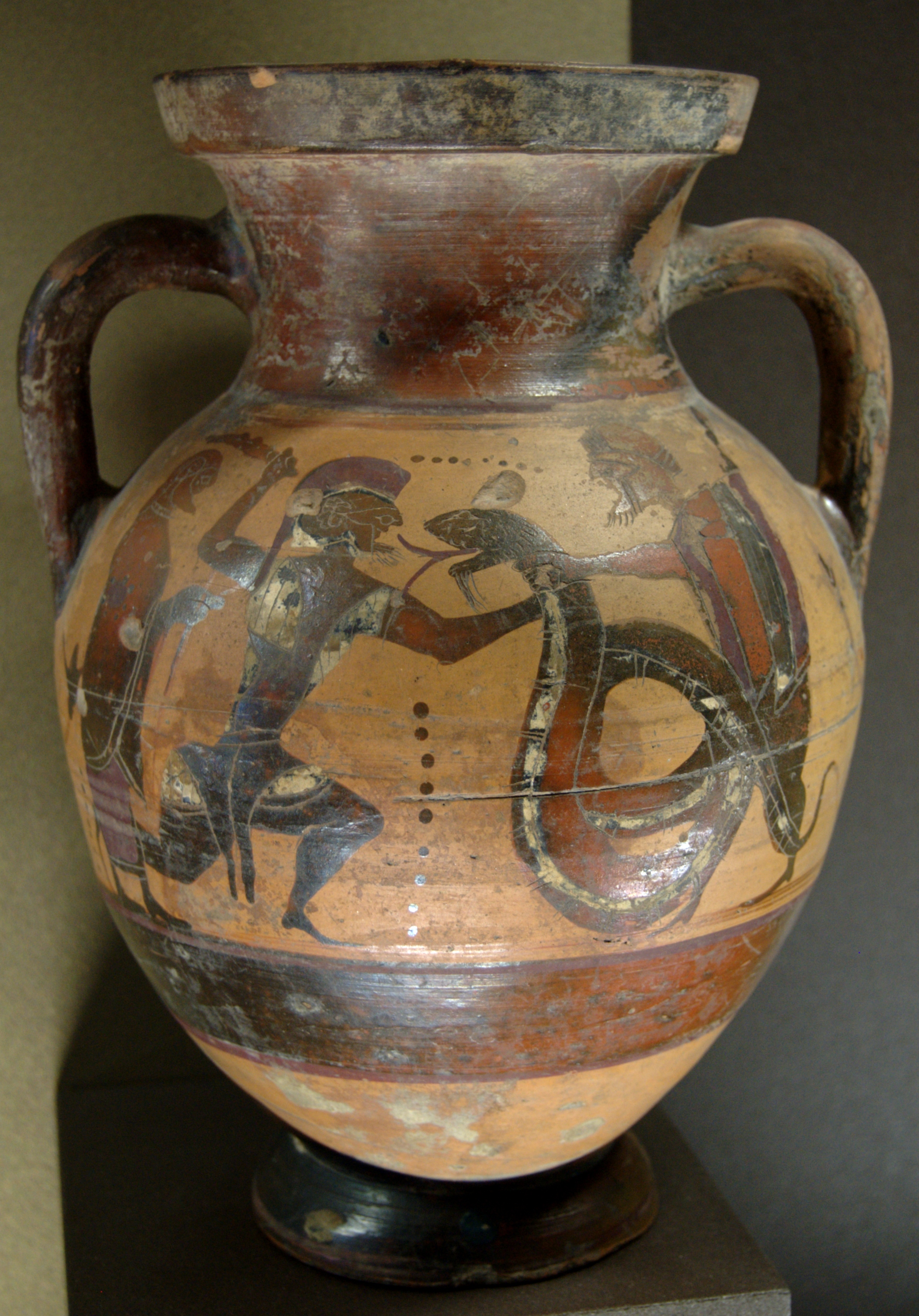
Kadmos and the dragon. Front of a black-figure amphora, circa 560–550 BC. Paris: Louvre.

Euboean black-figure vase painting was influenced by Corinth and predominantly Attica. The distinction of Boeotian from Attic products is not always easy. Scholars assume that the bulk of the finds was produced in Eretria. Especially amphorae, lekythoi, hydriai and plates were painted. Large format amphorae were normally used for mythological imagery, such as the adventures of Herakles and the Judgement of Paris. Very large amphorae, derived from shapes of the 7th century, had conical lips and often showed images related to weddings. They were probably funeral vases, made especially for children who died before marriage. Typical of Eretrian black-figure pottery is the restricted use of incision and the regular use of white paint for floral ornaments. Apart from images orientated on Attic tradition, there was also wilder imagery, such as the rape of a deer by a satyr, or Herakles with centaurs and daimons. Vases of the Dolphin Class were originally considered Attic by scholars, but are now recognised as Euboean. However, their clay does not resemble that from any known Eretrian sources, suggesting that they were made in Chalkis. For some black-figure styles, the origin is disputed. Thus, Chalkidian vase painting was initially considered Euboean, but is now usually assumed to be from Italy.

== Bibliography ==
- John Boardman: Early Greek Vase Painting. 11th to 6th Century BC. A Handbook, Thames and Hudson, London 1998 (World of Art), p. 215f. ISBN 0-500-20309-1
- Thomas Mannack: Griechische Vasenmalerei. Eine Einführung. Theiss, Stuttgart 2002, p. 70, 79f. ISBN 3-8062-1743-2.
- Gerald Schaus: Geometrische Vasenmalerei. In: Der Neue Pauly, vol 4, cols 935-938.
- Johannes Schwind: Orientalisierende Vasenmalerei. In: Der Neue Pauly, vol 9, cols 23-26.
- Matthias Steinhart: Schwarzfigurige Vasenmalerei II. Ausserattisch. In: Der Neue Pauly, vol 11, cols 276-281.
