= Rhodian vase painting =

Regional style of East Greek vase painting

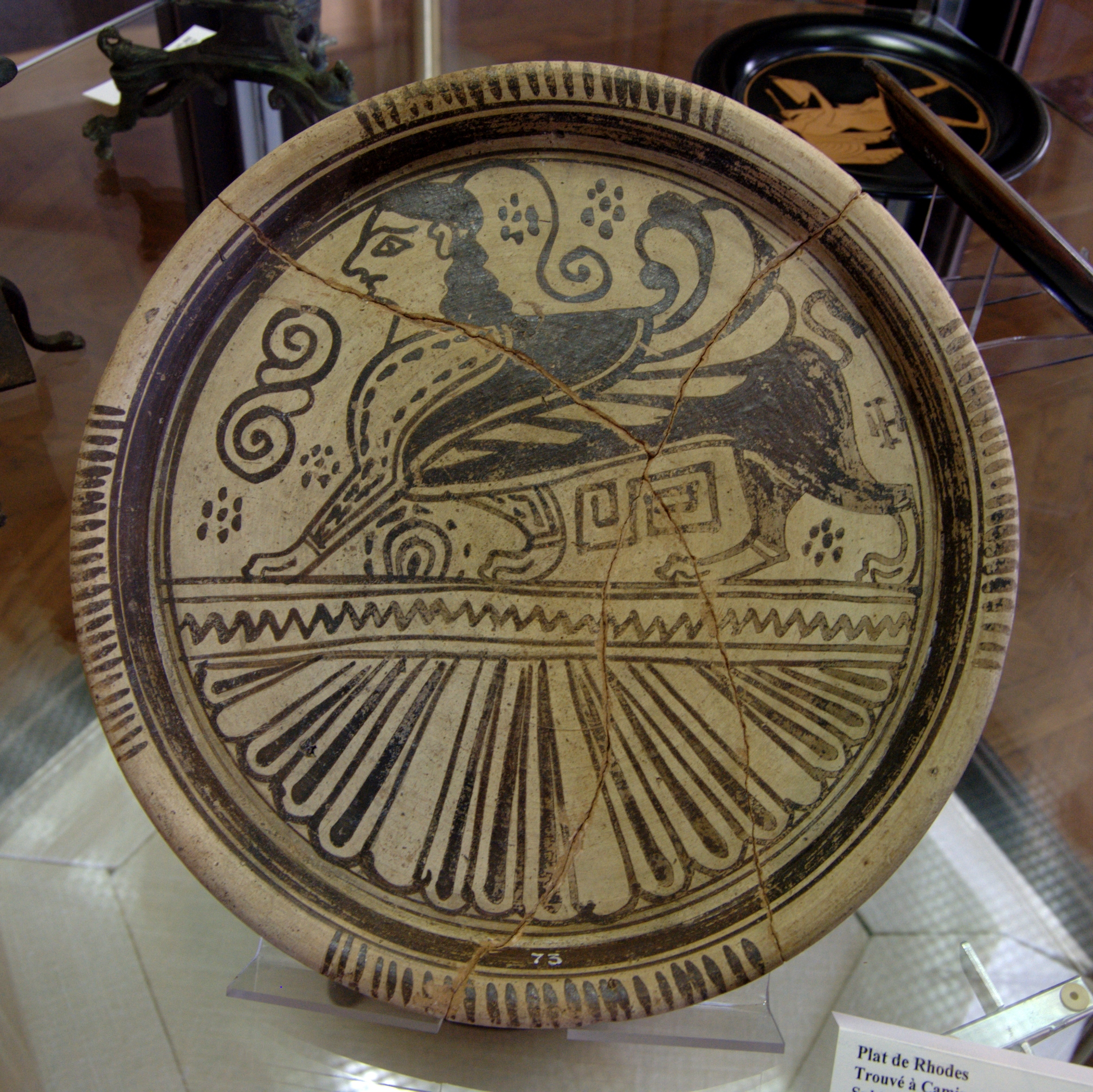
Rhodian plate, end of 7th century BC

Rhodian vase painting was a regional style of East Greek vase painting, based on the island of Rhodes.

Especially well known are the Rhodian plates. These were painted in a polychrome (multi-coloured) technique, with some detail incised, as in black-figure vase painting. Between 560 and 530 BC, situlae based on Egyptian models prevailed. They depicted both Greek themes such as Typhoeus, and others inspired by ancient Egyptian tradition, such as Egyptian hieroglyphs and Egyptian athletics.

== Bibliography ==
- Thomas Mannack: Griechische Vasenmalerei. Eine Einführung. Thesis, Stuttgart 2002, p. 81f., 90-94, 134f.. ISBN 3-8062-1743-2.
- Matthias Steinhart: Schwarzfigurige Vasenmalerei II. Ausserattisch. In Der Neue Pauly, vol. 11, col. 276-281.
