= Wuxing painting =

Style of Chinese painting

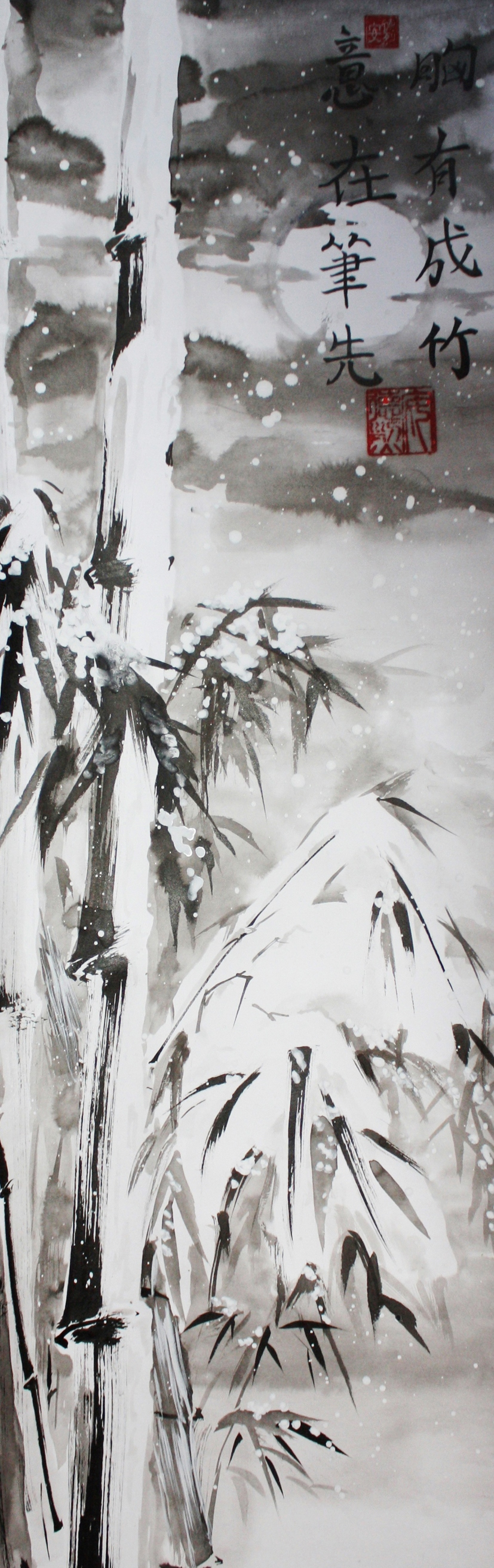
Example of Wuxing Painting

Wuxing painting is a style of Chinese painting that draws inspiration from the philosophical concept of the "five phases/elements" (wuxing). Specifically, it combines the use of Chinese freehand brush work techniques and the metaphysics of the five wuxing elements. Wuxing painting also inherited some traits from several wushu and qigong schools of Chinese martial arts. The closest martial art in style is xingyiquan, whose 5 primary movements are balanced with the 5 elements of wuxing. Because wuxing painting techniques are associated foremost with consciousness and overcoming corporeal restraints, it is common to speak of the manifest art therapy influence of this method.

Wuxing painting has a total of five brush strokes, five movements, and five types of composition, corresponding to the elements "Wood", "Fire", "Earth", "Metal", and "Water".

Through wuxing painting one can create a picture identical in its external appearance to any example of traditional Chinese painting. In this regard there is no difference between wuxing painting and traditional Chinese painting. Still, if one compares wuxing painting and traditional painting styles there are a number of differences in technique:

- Traditional Chinese painting is usually divided into several genres: mountains and water, birds and branches, grass and insects, etc. and does not usually extend beyond these genres. wuxing painting is not tied to any genres. Using the five brush strokes the artist can paint everything that they want.
- Traditional Chinese painting inherited an attachment to Xuan paper and silk as well as to a certain type of paint, while wuxing has no such limitations.

The single most important thing for the artist who practices wuxing painting is an attractive image harmoniously constructed using the wuxing system. Everything else is secondary, including the type of artistic materials, the genre, and so on.
