= Zhostovo painting =

Painted Russian metal tray

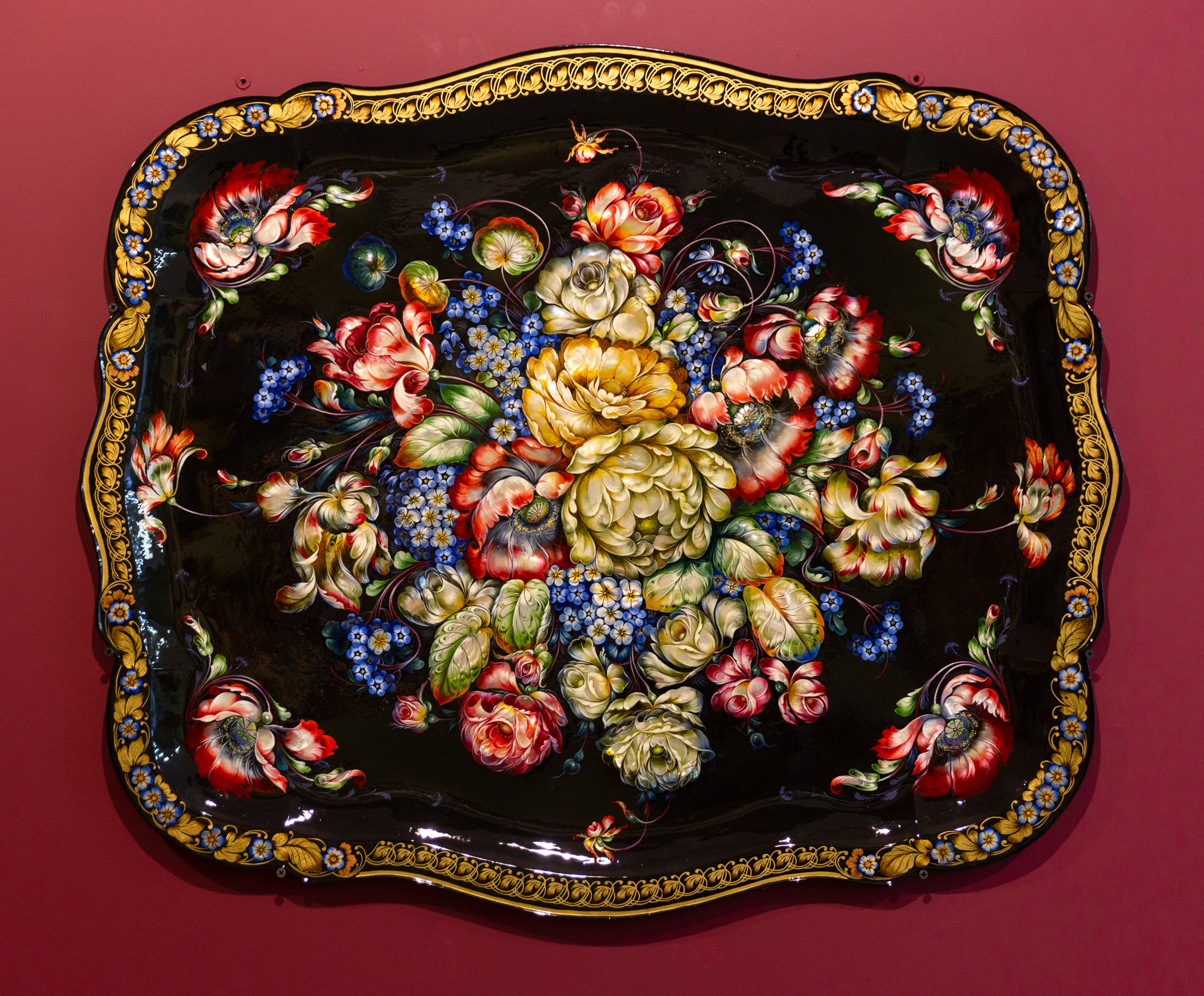
A Zhostovo painted tray

Zhostovo painting (Russian: Жостовская роспись) is a Russian folk handicraft. It involves painting metal trays. It is practiced in the village of Zhostovo in the Moscow Oblast. It appeared in the early 19th century, mainly under the influence of the Ural handicraft of flower painting on metal. Subsequent development of Zhostovo painting handicraft was stylistically related to porcelain and enamel painting techniques, used by factories near Moscow, flower motifs on printed cotton, produced by the Ivanovo factories, and Lukutin miniatures (see Fedoskino miniatures).

== History ==
Zhostovo handicrafts began early in the 18th century, when Ossip Filippovich Vishnyakov opened his workshop there in 1825. The Vishnyakov workshop sold products made from papier-mâché, including boxes, cigar cases, and trays.

In the 19th century, in some of Moscows's suburbs and villages of former Troitsk oblast appeared some workshops for manufacturing lacquered products made of papier-mâché. The origins of its painting technique are in Tagil painting, which appeared in the 18 century. In 1922 Novoseltsevo work artel was founded in Novoseltsevo to produce lacquered metal trays; in 1924 Zhostovo work artel and Spetskustar were founded there. Lakirovshik and Svoy trud were founded in 1925. The artels were united in 1925 to form Metallopodnos.

In the 1930s Soviet art's trend towards realism led to changes in the traditional ways, and applied to Zhostovo patterns that were made by professional artists without considering folk art. Zhostovo's lead artists resisted the pressure to abandon their traditions.

Earlier Zhostovo painting was part of the manufacture of housewares. It evolved into an independent form of decoration and craft that would become a unique style of Russian folk art, known as the Zhostovo Factory of Decorative Painting (Жостовская фабрика декоративной росписи).

== Production process ==
Zhostovo painting is a handicraft of painting on metal trays, preliminary coated with layers of priming (putty) and oil varnish (usually, black). Painting is done in a few consecutive energetic and firm strokes with a soft brush and oil paints, richly diluted with linseed oil. The most widely used motif is mixed garden and wild flowers. Tray edges are painted with a light golden ornament called уборка (uborka). A finished tray is then covered with three layers of light lacquer and polished to brilliance.
