= Wall painting in Turkey =

Archaeological paintings

Wall Painting in Turkey often reflects influences from the eastern and western styles and subject matters that date back to the Neolithic Age as the region has been a crossroads between Europe and the Middle East.

== Neolithic Age ==
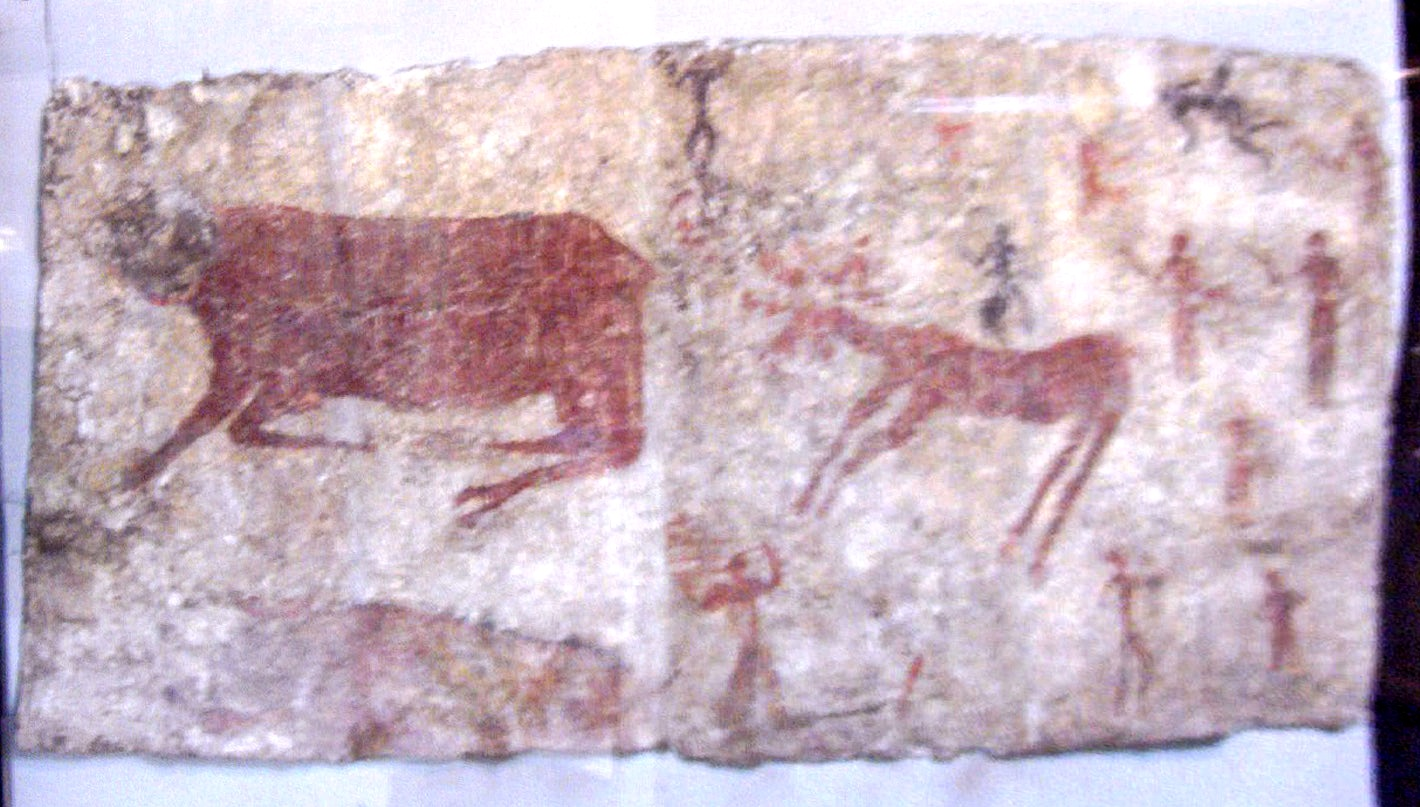
Wall painting of a bull, deer and man from Çatalhöyük; 6th millennium BC

The Neolithic site Çatalhöyük has a number of wall paintings depicting animals and hunting scenes. Since this region was a source for obsidian blades, these images may reflect some aspects of daily life during the 7th-6th millennia BC. Other wall paintings at this site depict birds consuming flesh from headless bodies. These scenes may reflect Near Eastern practices of the preparation of corpses for burial. The separate archaeological finds of heads and bodies buried under rooms may also indicate the performance of this ritual. Another wall painting found at Çatalhöyük, and now on display at the Anatolian Civilizations Museum in Ankara, may be the world's oldest map. It shows a series of rectangles that may depict houses, and a possible profile drawing of a local volcanic mountain. Fragments of white plaster colored with red ochre at the later site called Can Hasan indicate that wall painting in Anatolia continued into the Chalcolithic Period.

== Bronze Age ==
The evidence for wall painting during the Bronze Age is less abundant. Tiny fragments of painted plaster have been found in the Late Bronze Age levels of Troy and at the Hittite capital of Hattusa (Boğazköy). The Hittites were also in contact with civilizations in Syria that had wall paintings and probably exchanged ideas with them.

== Iron Age ==
The Iron Age provides more evidence for the decoration of walls with paint. First, the 8th-7th century BC fortified sites of the Urartian kingdom in eastern Anatolia have some paintings that combine Neo-Assyrian and Anatolian stylistic elements. Paintings from the temple at Patnos (Anzavur/Kot Tepe) depict bulls striding and kneeling. At Van-Toprakkale, traces of blue and red paint were discovered in a temple. Evidence for painting was also discovered at Altıntepe and Haykaberd.

=== Archaic Period ===
In the middle of the 6th century BCE, the Achaemenid Persian Empire, led by Cyrus the Great, conquered most of the polities that existed at that time across western Anatolia, most notably the Lydian kingdom of Croesus. The consolidation of this area under a single external power from the east affected the indigenous cultures. A ruling Persian elite undoubtedly brought a knowledge of imperial iconography with them from home. These outside ideas combined with local ideas as well as Greek ideas brought from the west, to form a new style used by Anatolians in the decoration of their walls. Most of our artistic evidence from this period comes from burial chambers.

For half a century before the Persians invaded, the Lydians of west-central Anatolia had been burying their rulers in stone chamber tombs under monumental tumulus burial markers, a form borrowed in part from the Phrygians. Although the Lydian tumuli become smaller after the Persian invasion, they also become more numerous. Thus a local burial tradition was allowed to continue, but with changes based on outside influences. For example, stone klinai (death couches) imitated Greek wooden originals in shape and painted decoration. Two of the known tombs of Lydian Tumuli had painted walls. Unfortunately, looting and destruction of the tombs, as well as the subsequent dispersal of the paintings and objects on the art market, has significantly limited the scientific investigation of these tombs.

The first tomb, called Harta, or Abidintepe, is located in Manisa Province and has three separate profile views of human figures. It is believed that these three persons were walking one behind the other with many additional figures in a procession around the tomb chamber, possibly bearing gifts for the deceased. This type of procession is very similar to the one carved in relief on the Apadana at Persepolis. Further Persian influence is evident from the servant costume worn by one figure that reflects costumes seen at Darius I's palace at Susa.

A second Lydian tumulus, called Aktepe and located in Uşak province, has two human figures painted on opposite walls of the tomb chamber. They flank and face toward where the body would have lain. Their gestures include holding a branch towards the body with one hand and holding the other hand before their mouths, possibly as a sign of silent reverence. They appear to wear Greek-style clothing.

Moving to the southeast edge of Lydia, we find a wooden tomb chamber from the Tatarlı tumulus near Dinar in modern Afyon province. The panels of this tomb were painted and include a scene of battling soldiers that is reminiscent of Greek vase painting.

Two tombs from this period with wall paintings have also been discovered in Lycia. The Karaburun tomb has a scene depicting a man reclining and holding aloft a drinking bowl. This may reflect elements of the Anatolian tradition of the funerary feast, well known from tumulus burials at Gordion. The other painted Lycian tomb is Kızılbel, which depicts Greek legends from the Homeric epics, as well as aspects of kingship similar to those seen in Assyrian imagery.

One unique set of wall paintings from around 500BCE was found at Gordion, the previous capital city of the Phrygian kingdom. A small building with many painted plaster fragments was discovered on the citadel between two larger megara, and was dubbed "the painted house." The fragments include pieces of human figures in profile, and thus may have been part of a procession similar to that seen in the Harta tumulus. The exact purpose of the painted house is unclear, though a ritual or even funerary function cannot be ruled out.

== See also ==
- History of Anatolia
- Mural
