= Tibetan Buddhist wall paintings =

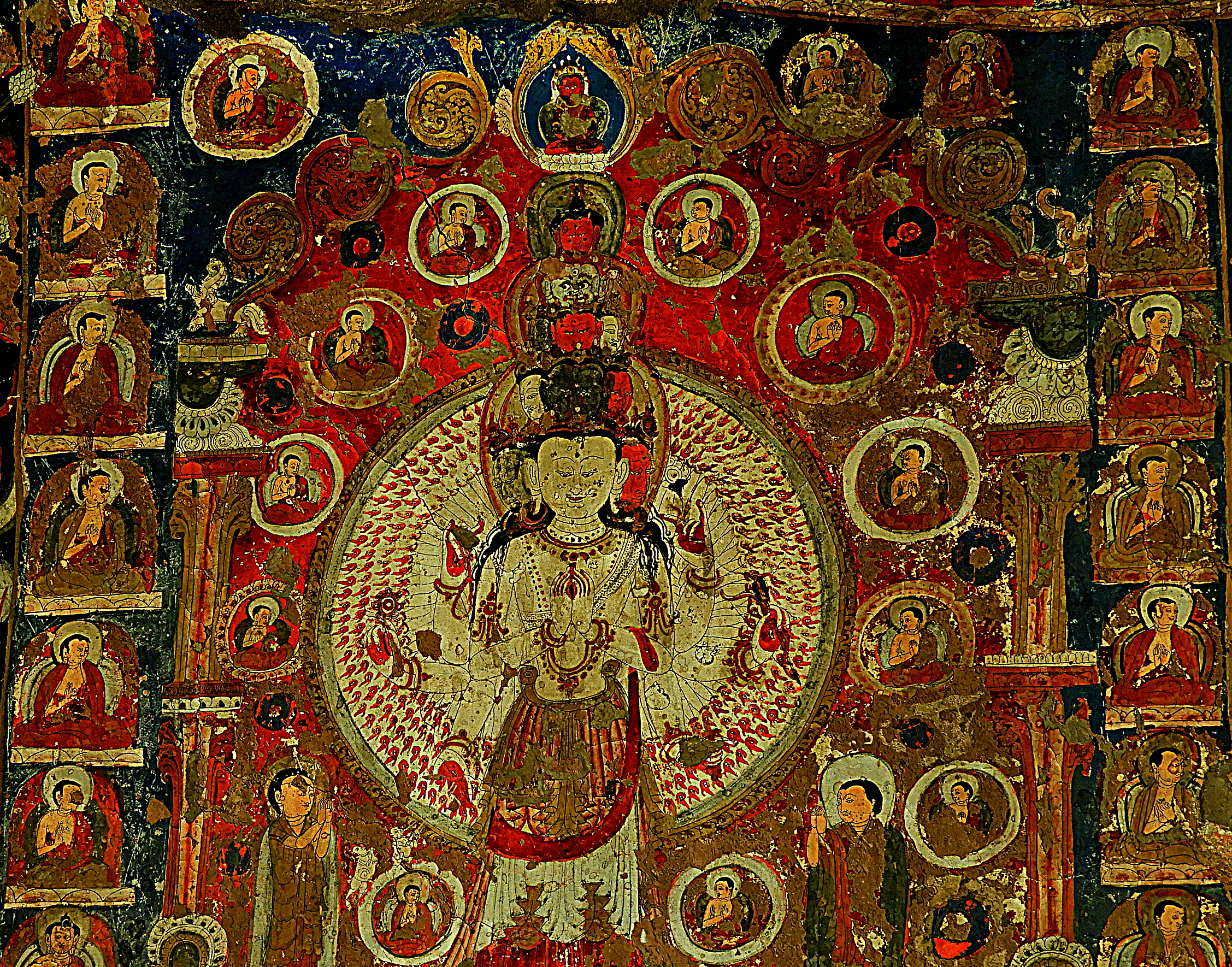
1000 armed Avalokiteshvara dated 13th - 15th century AD at Saspol cave in Ladakh, India

Most Tibetan Buddhist monasteries, temples and other religious structures in the Himalayas were decorated with Tibetan Buddhist wall paintings. Despite much destruction in Tibet itself, many of these survive, the dry climate of the Tibetan Plateau assisting their survival, as the wet Indian climate has reduced survival of paintings from there. There are some regional differences, but the techniques described here cover the traditional wall paintings across this area. The wall paintings were executed on earthen plaster with the secco-technique. A secco-technique is a painting technique in which the pigments with their binder are employed to paint onto a dry (Italian: secco) wall.

== Painting technique ==
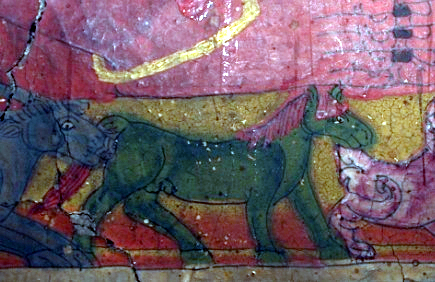
Detail wall painting, Ladakh

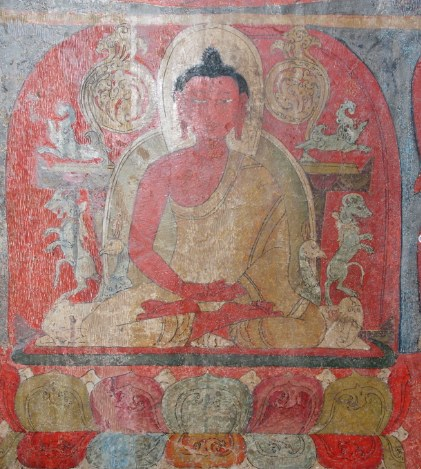
Detail of a wall painting in a Buddhist temple in Ladakh/India

The support for wall paintings is made of earthen plaster, usually consisting of more than one layer of earthen plaster, in which the last layer is rendered as smoothly as possible. The support was covered by a smoothened ground, generally in white. Materials employed for the ground may be kaolin, chalk or gypsum, or any other white material deriving from an inert mineral. To organise the painting, preliminary sketches were carried out. Generally, this involved the geometric layout of the design with the help of snapped lines and/or rulers. Compasses were employed mainly for the construction of mandalas. Figures were roughly sketched, and then rendered with precise contours. These outlines are usually in black. Repetitive designs were in some cases achieved with the use of stencils.

Traditionally, colour codes were employed to accelerate and simplify the colouring of the various ornaments and figures. For this purpose each section was given a number from 1-9 or an abbreviation of the name of the colour. Some paintings were embellished with raised ornaments (pastiglia-technique). Either a semi-liquid paste was applied to the painting surface, or a stamp had been previously produced from a mould and then applied onto the painting surface. Depending on the final visible colour of a painting, specific colours for the underpainting were employed. An ochre for example has an underpainting in a bright yellow. Similar to Tibetan paintings, the traditional painting was carried out with shading systems, such as a dry or wet shading system. Shading may be obtained with glazes, or with one of the dry shading systems, such as the dot-shading technique in which minuscule dots of colour cover the painting surface. Specific details were then achieved with small paint brushes employing a variety of colours: black, white, ochre or red.

Specific ornaments of a representation were enriched with gold. This was either applied as a gold leaf or as a powder in a binder.

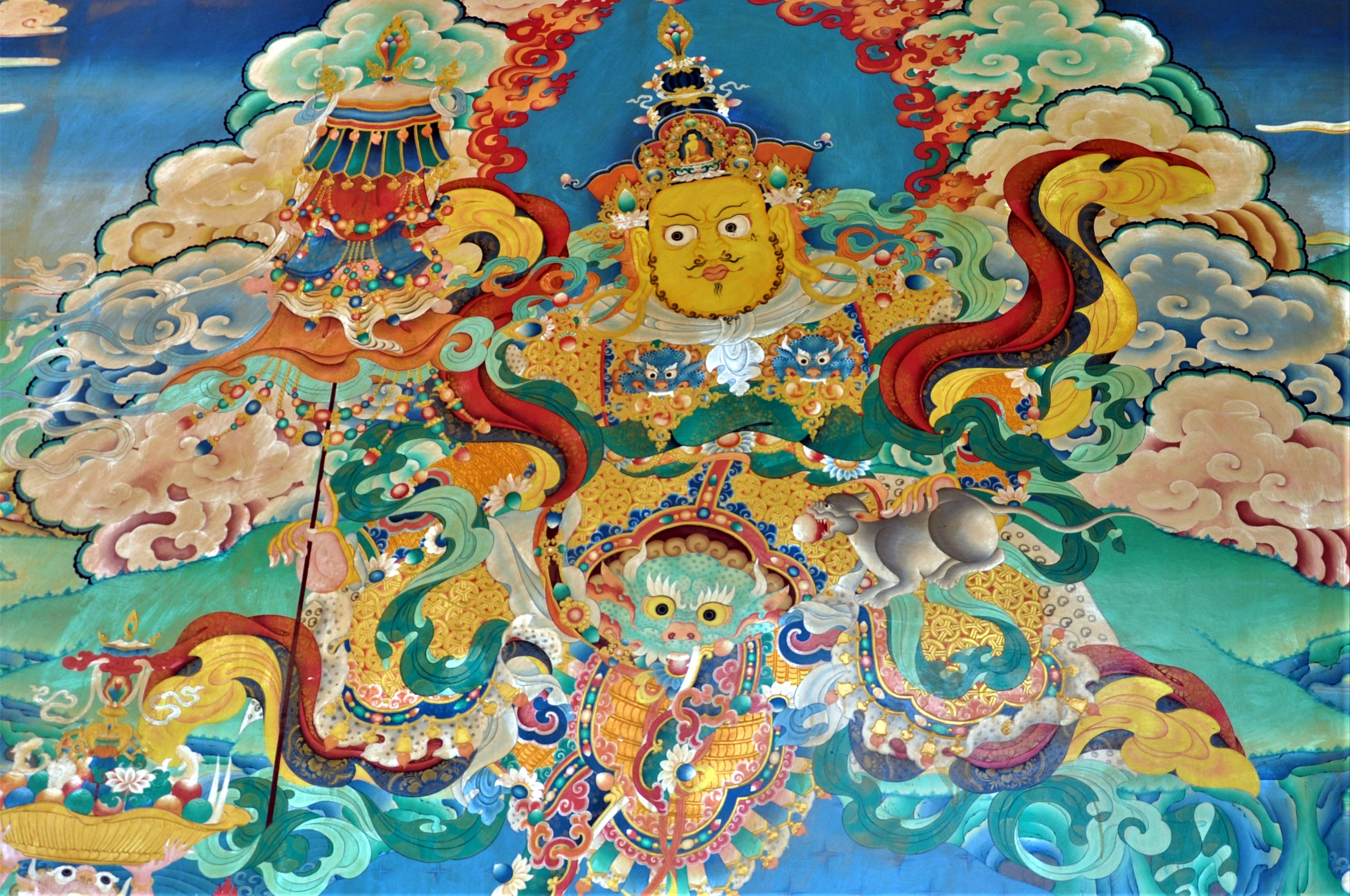
Murals at Kungri Gompha Monastery - India

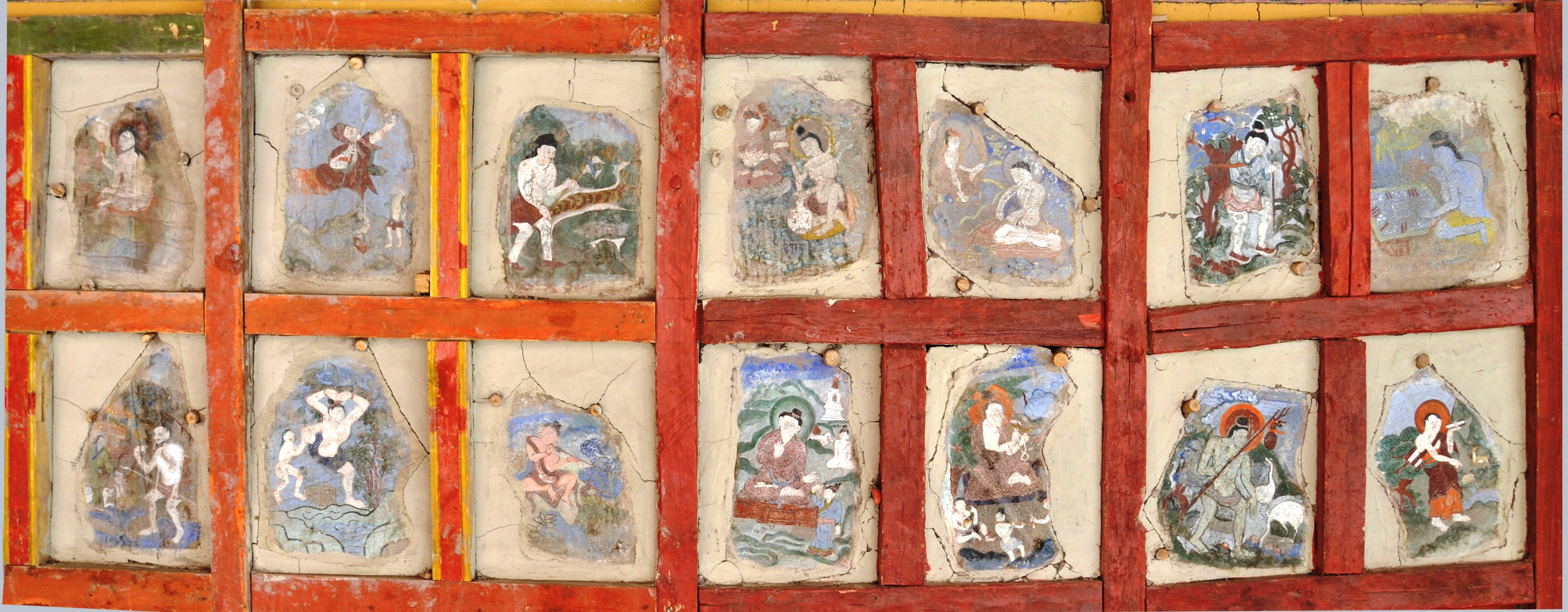
Hemis Monastery - 17th century paintings in Plaster
