= Argive vase painting =

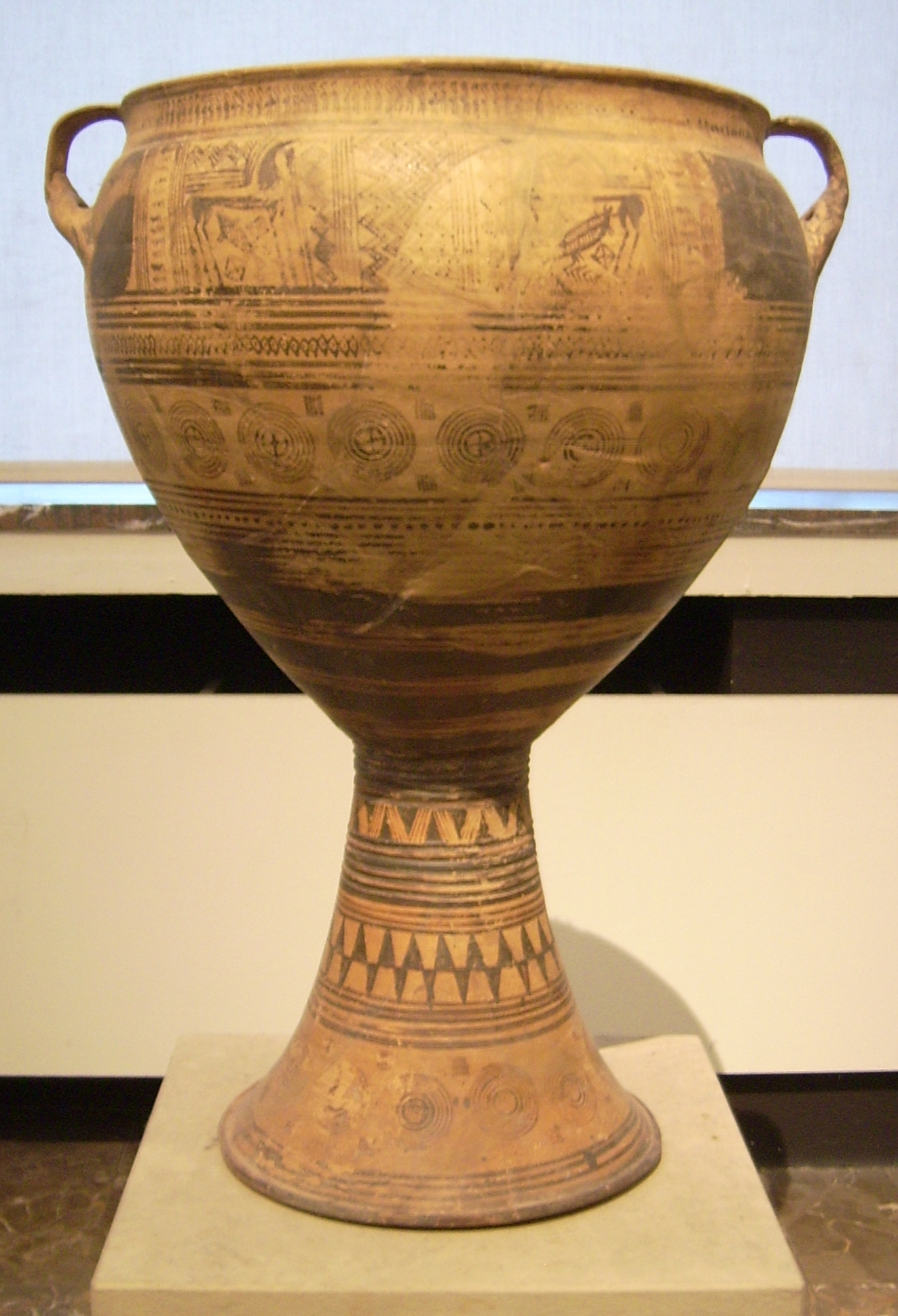
Late Geometric krater from an Argive workshop; on the shoulder depictions of horses. Circa 730 BC. Found on Melos.

Argive vase painting was a regional style of Greek Geometric vase painting from the city of Argos.

Besides Athens, Argos was one of the centres of Geometric vase painting. Argive potters followed influences especially from Attic vase painting, until the final phase of the style (750/690 BC). Typical of the Argive Geometric vases are large pictorial panels, containing either horses or men and horses. Waterfowl and fish were often depicted in the background. Ornamentation is dominated by stepped meanders and orientalising motifs.

== Bibliography ==
- Thomas Mannack: Griechische Vasenmalerei. Eine Einführung. Thesis, Stuttgart 2002, p. 81f., 90–94, 134f. ISBN 3-8062-1743-2.
- Gerald P. Schaus: Geometrische Vasenmalerei, In: Der Neue Pauly, vol. 4, cols. 935–938
