= Kinetic Pointillism =

Kinetic Pointillism is a technique used in painting, where an image is created with points of color applied in patterns of movement, with the intention of reinforcing the message of the artwork. An early developer of the technique is Rob Ottesen, who first showed works made from the technique in 2013, and who focused on teaching the technique to adolescent students. Mediums used include paint, ink, and other mediums. An aspect of the technique includes the use of cultural images and spelled-out words.

Exhibitions of the artwork have been shown at the Port St. Lucie Civic Center Art Gallery. Ottesen’s personal work has been shown at the Gutenberg Museum in Mainz, Germany, the Museum of Printing in North Andover, Massachusetts, and the John Jarrold Printing Museum in Norwich, England.

The director of international affairs of kinetic pointillism is artist Ganesh Shenoy, according to a press release in January 2024 . On May 3, 2023, Ganesh Shenoy authored the first-ever book on the Kinetic Pointillism art movement, publishing it as an e-book.
