= Wasli =

Special kind of handmade paper for miniature paintings

Wasli, also referred to as wasli paper, is a type of handmade paper used specifically for painting miniatures. It was devised in India, in the 10th century, and figures widely in Mughal-era painting.

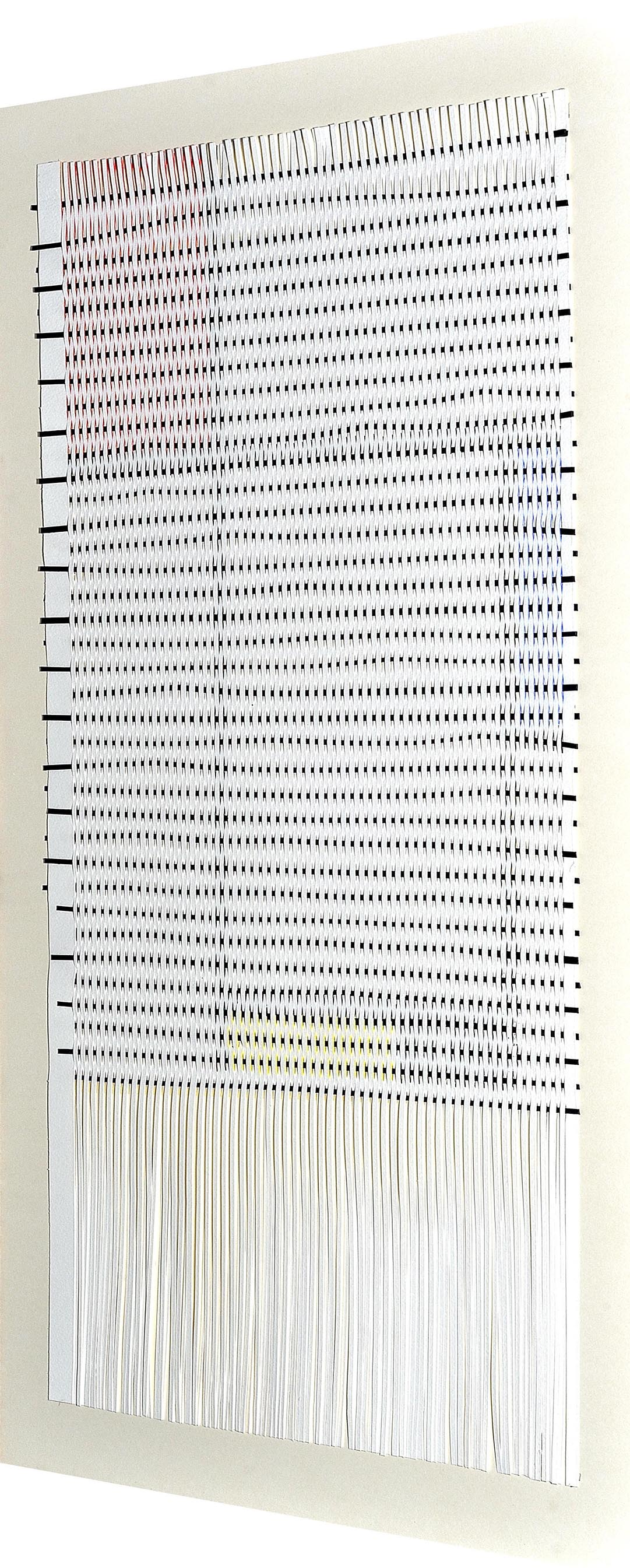
Opaque watercolor on woven wasli paper

Wasli can be produced to varying thickness and its uses range from classical/traditional painting methods with opaque water colors to building structures of various kinds.

Miniature Painting is a term used for making opaque/translucent water color paintings/illustrations on a small scale inspired from Persian or Pahari miniature schools and Wasli is used as a canvas for making miniatures.

The term derives from a Persian word Vasl which means union or coming together, oneness, etc.

Wasli is an acid-free paper and it has archival qualities. Paper-eating insects cannot eat it because of a poison copper sulphate (Neela Thootha) used its preparation. The glue typically used to paste sheets together is also acid-free, being made out of cooking flour.

To use it for miniature paintings this layered paper is burnished with either smooth glass or a sea shell. This way the paper is shiny and smooth and has minimal perceptible grain.
