= Pulled string painting =

Painting technique

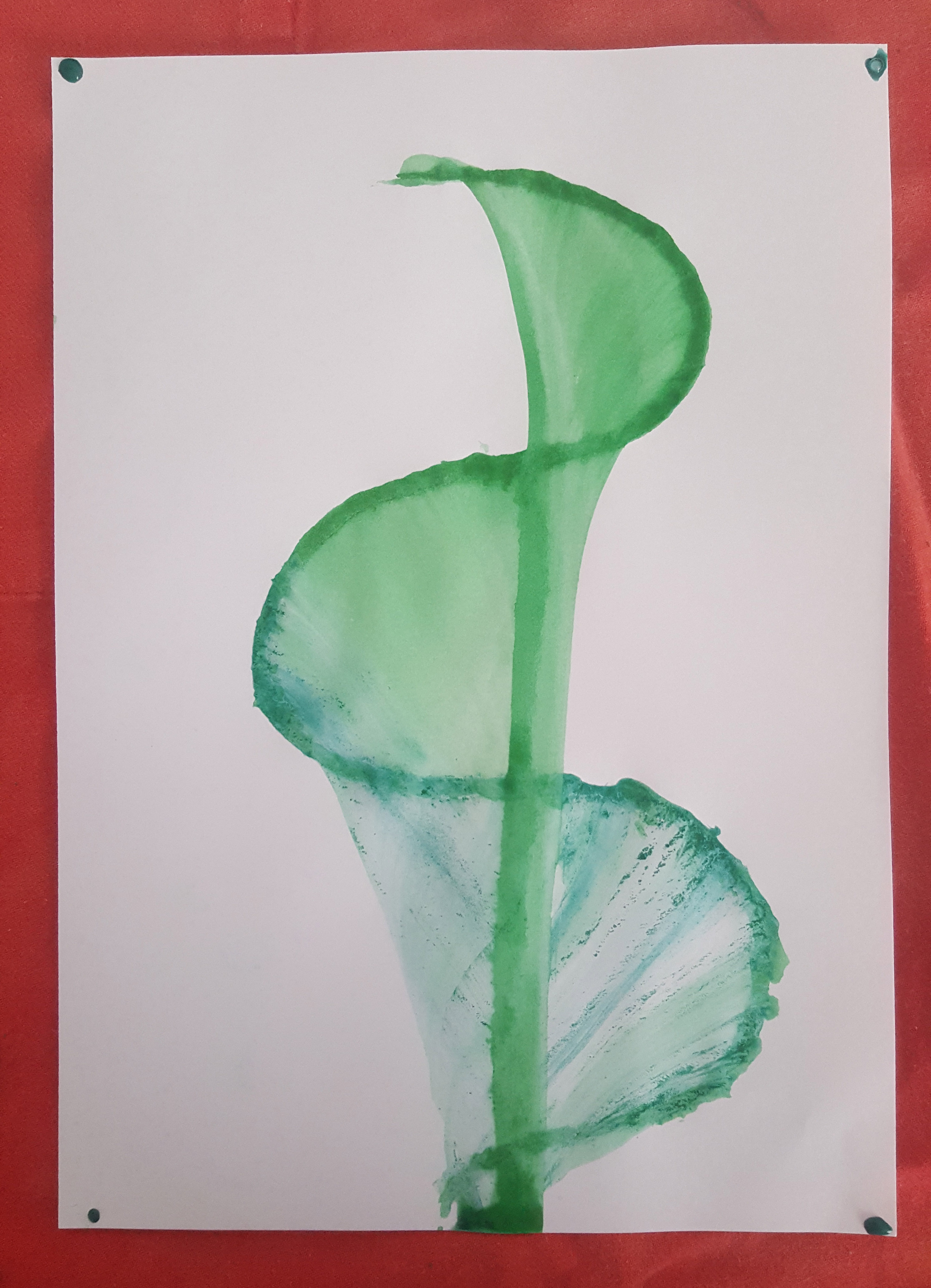
Pulled string painting

Pulled string painting is a painting method using strings that have paint on them to which they are placed in a certain way and then pulled on top a painting material.
