= Caeretan hydria =

Ancient Greek painted vase, belonging to the black-figure style

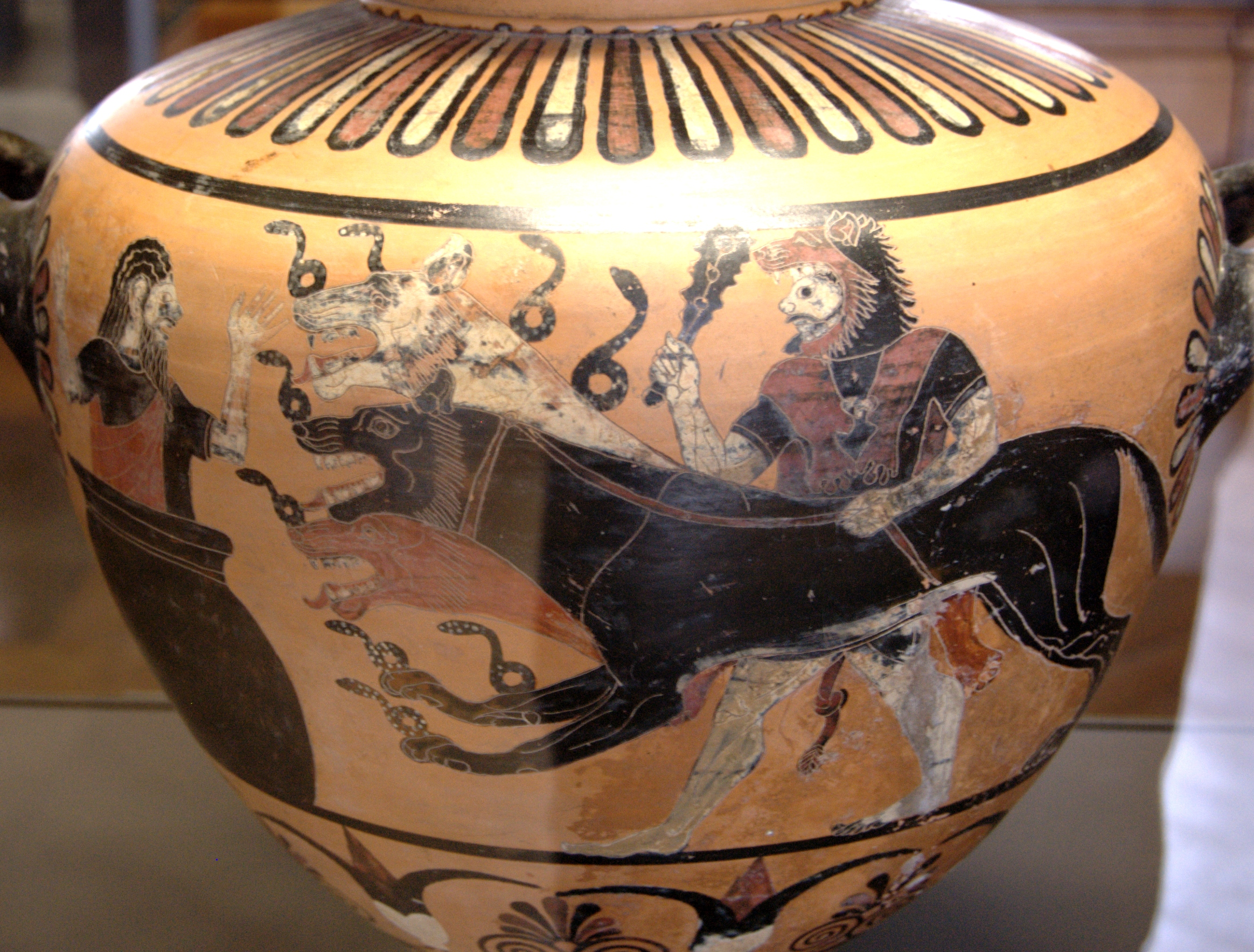
Herakles, Kerberos and Eurystheus on a hydria by the Eagle Painter, circa 525 BC. Paris: Louvre.

A Caeretan hydria is a type of ancient Greek painted vase, belonging to the black-figure style.

Caeretan hydria is a particularly colourful type of Greek vase painting. Their geographic origin is disputed by scholars, but in recent years the view that they were produced by two potter-painters who had emigrated from East Greece to Caere in Etruria has gained ground. Based on their style, they were for a long time considered as either Etruscan or Corinthian products. However, added inscriptions in Ionic Greek support the hypothesis of immigration. The workshop only lasted for one generation. Currently, about 40 vases of this style are known, all produced by the two masters and their assistants. None have been discovered outside Etruria, with the majority excavated in Caere, after which site they were named by Carl Humann and Otto Puchstein. They are dated to between about 530 and 510/500 BC.

The hydriai have a height of 40 to 45 cm. Attached to the body are off-set widely swaying necks; the body itself features broad shoulders. Low ring-bases shaped like upturned chalices are attached at the bottom. The technical quality of the vases is rather low. Many are warped or show signs of bad firing. Additionally, many have dints that must be derived from rough handling before firing. The painting of the body is separated in four zones: the shoulder, a figural and an ornamental zone on the belly, and a bottom area. Except the figural zone on the belly, all other areas bore ornamental decoration. Only a single piece with two figural zones on the belly is known.

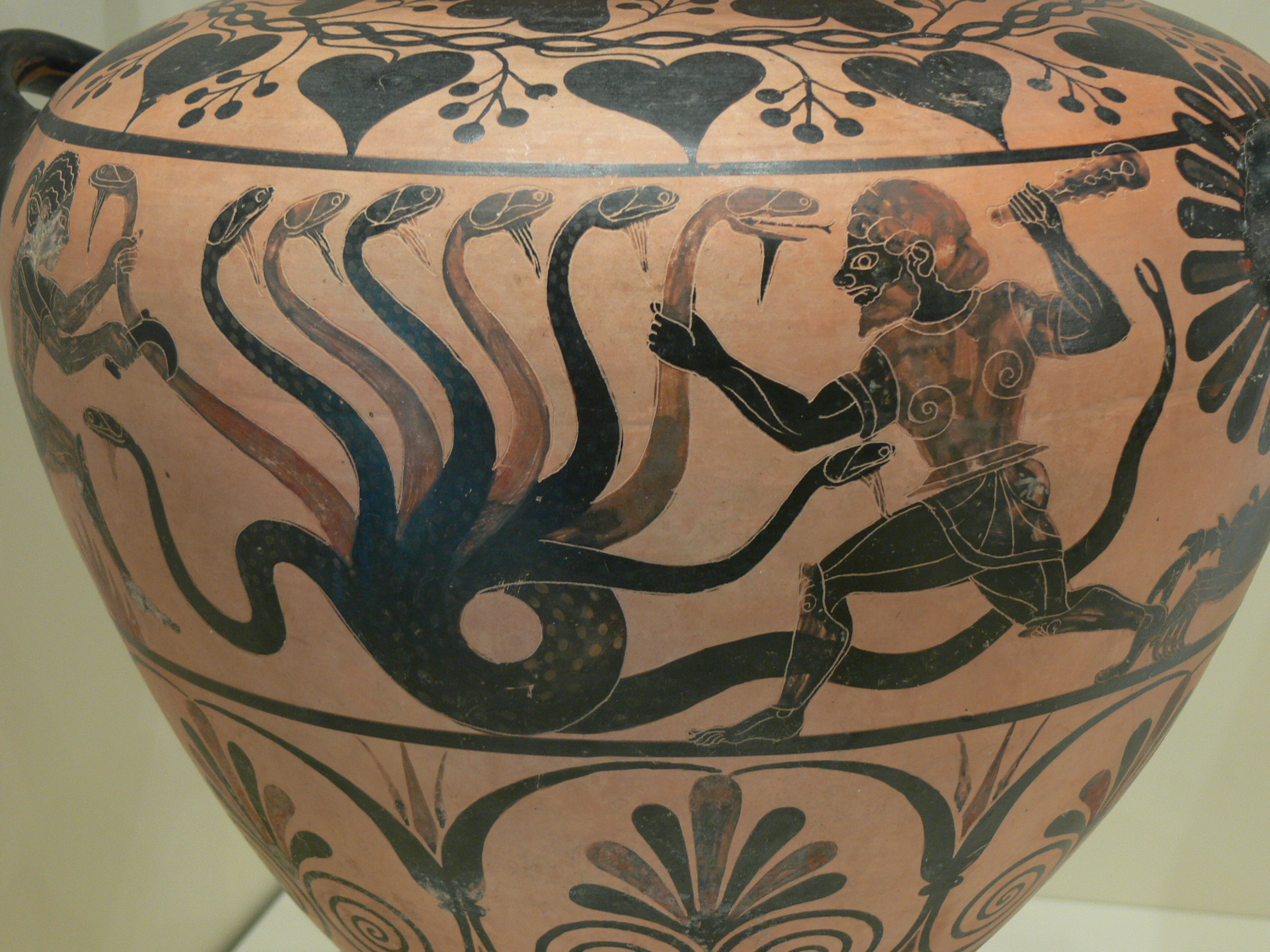
Herakles fighting the Lernaean Hydra on a hydria by the Eagle Painter, circa 525 BC. Malibu: Getty Villa.

The striking feature of the vases is their colourful decoration In this regard they differ from all other styles of black-figure vase painting. The style resembles Ionian vase painting and multicoloured wooden panels found in Egypt. Their figural decoration is on the belly. Men are depicted with red, black or white skin, women virtually always in white. Contours and interior detail were incised, as is common in black-figure vases. Areas covered in black shiny slip were often covered with an additional layer of white shiny slip, so that the underlying black would be visible in incised details. The front imagery is always dynamic, the back often heraldic in nature.

The ornamentation is a major constituent of the hydriai, it is not upstaged by the figural motifs. Stencils were used to create the ornaments; they are not incised. The feet, handle attachments and inside of the mouth are decorated with alternating red and black flames. Because of the two-layer slip, the flames are black-rimmed. The necks are decorated with meanders, spiral crosses or polychrome budded tendrils, a single known piece features a bucranium. The shoulders were painted with flame patterns or black ivy tendrils and berries. Black, white and red rays are placed above the foot. Under the handles, there are single palmettes.

The study of Caeretan Hydriai was advanced especially by Jaap M. Hemelrijk. He also distinguished the two masters to whom the vases are ascribed, but his distinction of potters and painters of ornaments has not prevailed. He called the two artists the Busiris Painter and the Eagle Painter. The latter is considered the superior representative of the style. They were especially interested in mythological motifs, usually indicating an eastern influence. On the name vase of the Busiris Painter, Herakles is trampling the Egyptian pharaoh Busiris. Herakles generally occurs frequently, e.g. with Nessos, Acheloos, the Nemean Lion, Alkyoneus or Pholos. Hermes is depicted stealing cattle. There are also images of Odysseus and Polyphemus, Europa, Dionysos and the return of Hephaistos to Mount Olympus. Besides, there are scenes from everyday life, e.g. palaistra scenes, hunts, sacrifices and warriors. Some vases show rare motifs, e.g. Keto accompanied by a white seal. In once case, both painters collaborated on a single vase.

Apart from the hydriai, a single alabastron by the Eagle Painter is known. Stylistically closely related to the Caeretan hydriai are striped neck amphorae.

== Bibliography ==
- Jaap M. Hemelrijk: Caeretan Hydriae. Zabern, Mainz 1984. ISBN 3-8053-0740-3
- Jaap M. Hemelrijk: More about Caeretan Hydriae. Addenda et clarificanda. Allard Pierson Museum, Amsterdam 2009. ISBN 978-90-71211-44-7
- Rolf Hurschmann: Caeretaner Hydrien. In: Der Neue Pauly, vol. 2, cols. 907–908.
