= Incised painting =

Incised painting is a technique used to decorate stone surfaces. First, a channel is scratched in the stone. Then, a thick paint or stucco plaster is laid across the surface. Last, the paint is scraped off the surface of the stone, leaving paint in the incision. This technique was used in decorating Akbar's tomb,

== See also ==
- Moghul art
