= Passionism =

Contemporary art movement in Scandinavia, anti-avantgarde in its approach

Passionism was created in 2000 by French artists Cat MOSS and METCUC.

It was officially launched at the forum de NICE in May 2002 (Nice Matin, FR3)

Created as a reaction to contemporary conceptual art, in particular the YBAs, Passionist art is born independently of the will of the artist, with no driving concept or message. The artist finds out what he created once it's done. The work is born from the artist's heart and soul, unfiltered by the mind.

With its roots firmly planted in abstract expressionism, Passionism also encompasses other art forms like photography, fashion design, music and film.

There are now thousands of Passionist artists all over the world, making French Passionism the first movement of the 21st century, and the first ever to be created by women and followed by artists of all genders, styles and media, all over the world.

Famous Passionists include Cat MOSS (France/UK/US), Metcuc (France), Sasha MOON (Ibiza & Bali Fashion) Bhex (South Africa), Jaded Lifestyles (London)

Later, in 2020, the term was appropriated by Scandinavian artists.

Passionism is a contemporary art movement in Scandinavia, anti-avantgarde in its approach. The term was coined by art critique Merete Sanderhoff in her work Sorte Billeder [Black Pictures] as an attempt to categorise talents outside the avantgarde canon, that did not fit into any known art category. They are referred to as the black sheep of the contemporary art scene.

The passionist artists are concerned with the continuation of pre-avantgarde painting traditions without turning into a repetition of these works. They are not simply postmodernists because they actually take the content and the techniques of these traditional paintings seriously. The content focuses on narratives of riddles, yearning, and solemnity. That does not mean they lack humour, but their paintings are meant to be taken seriously. There is a tendency to create very dark paintings hence the title black pictures. Furthermore, they often comment on the doctrines of the modern and postmodern art and art theories, moving beyond these rigid constraints.
