= Rissverklebung =

Technique for restoration of torn paintings

Rissverklebung is a technique of restoration of torn paintings by reweaving individual threads.

== See also ==
- Conservation and restoration of paintings
