= Thessalian vase painting =

Regional style of Greek vase painting, prevalent in Thessaly

Thessalian vase painting was a regional style of Greek vase painting, prevalent in Thessaly.

The Geometric vase painting of Thessaly was rather lifeless and provincial, especially compared to the dominant production centres such as Attica. Often, Attic styles were simply imitated.

== Bibliography ==
- Gerald P. Schaus: Geometrische Vasenmalerei, In: Der Neue Pauly, vol. 4 (1998), cols. 935-938
