= Conservation and restoration of Pompeian frescoes =

Aspect of Pompeian art restoration

The conservation and restoration of Pompeian frescoes describes the activities, methods, and techniques that have historically been and are currently being used to care for the preserved remains of the frescoes from the archeological site of Pompeii, Italy. The ancient city of Pompeii is famously known for its demise in A.D. 79 after the fatal eruption of Mount Vesuvius wiped out the population and buried the city beneath layers of compact lava material. In 1738, King Charles III or Charles of Bourbon, began explorations in Portici, Resina, Castellammare di Stabia, a Civita, where it was believed that the ancient cities of Pompeii, Stabiae, and Herculaneum were buried beneath. The first phase of the excavations at Pompeii started in 1748, which led to the first conservation and restoration efforts of the frescoes since their burial, and in 1764, open-air excavations began at Pompeii. Pompeii has a long history of excavation and restoration that began without a strong foundation or strategy. After centuries of cronyism, recurring financial shortages, and on-again-off-again restoration, the city's frescoes and structures were left in poor condition. In 1997, Pompeii was added to the UNESCO List of World Heritage Sites.

== Significant sites ==
=== Villa of the Mysteries ===
The Villa of the Mysteries is one of the best preserved homes in Pompeii.

=== Villa of P. Fannius Synistor at Boscoreale ===
The Villa of P. Fannius Synistor at Boscoreale was excavated in 1900 and many of the frescoes were stripped from the walls and auctioned off. One of the more notable conservation and restoration projects has taken place at the Metropolitan Museum of Art in New York, NY, where they have restored and installed the paintings (2002–2007) from the Villa's cubiculum, or bedroom, for the new Greek and Roman Galleries.

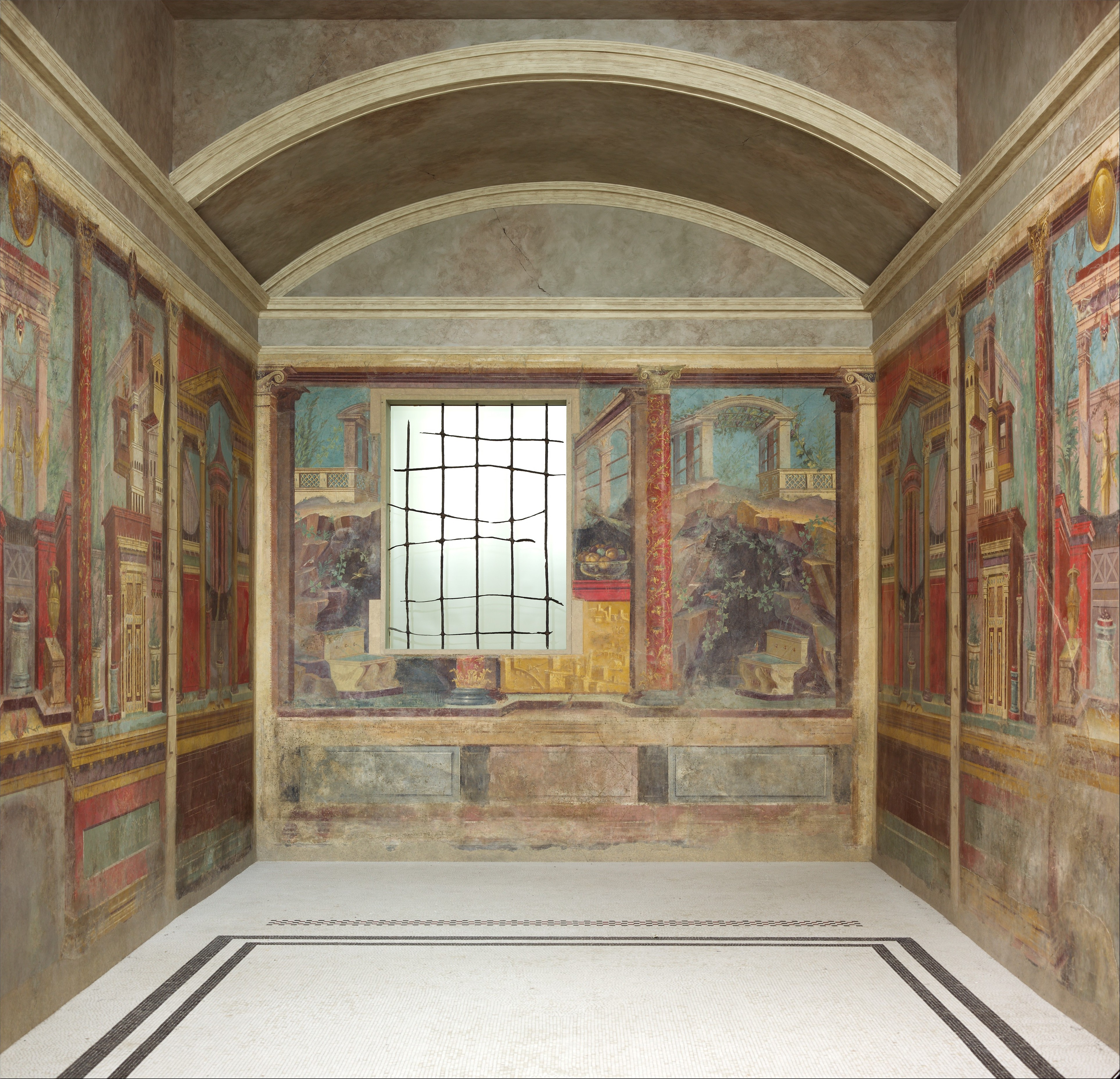
Frescoes from the Cubiculum (bedroom) in the Villa of P. Fannius Synistor at Boscoreale

=== House of the Vettii ===
The excavation of the House of the Vettii from 1894 to 1895 by Giuseppe Fiorelli led to the policy of completely restoring and reconstructing (select) houses and leaving all finds in situ as far as possible. The House of the Vettii, located in Regio VI of Pompeii, suffered significant damage and loss of its fourth style artwork during bombings in WWII.

=== Praedia of Julia Felix ===
The Praedia of Julia Felix, located in Regio II of Pompeii, was one of the first houses to be thoroughly explored and is the site where the first complete mural of the tablinum was detached in 1755, led by sculptor Joseph Canart.

== Composition and materials ==
=== Pigments ===
The pigments that were primarily used in the frescoes at Pompeii were mostly naturally occurring earth pigments such as:

- Red and yellow ochres
- Green earth
- Calcium carbonate (chalk)
- Black produced from soot or charcoal
- Egyptian blue (artificial pigment consisting of ground blue glass frit)
- Bright red cinnabar (toxic mercuric sulfide)

=== Application ===
Pompeian frescoes were executed in the buon fresco (true fresco) technique, in which the pigments were painted onto a freshly applied, damp/wet plaster ground. The plaster contains liquid lime (calcium hydroxide). In the process of drying, the liquid lime in the plaster combines with the paints and turns into carbonate of lime, which is chemically equivalent to limestone or marble. Upon drying and setting, the pigments permanently fuse to the plaster to form a solid, durable painting.

== Examination and analysis of frescoes ==
After the Irpinia earthquake in 1980 caused further weakening of Pompeii's crumbling walls, systematic initiatives were put into place to evaluate the damage. The excavation team took documentary photographs, conducted a systematic survey, and recorded the qualitative data through a computer processing system. From these findings, Mariette de Vos calculated that the number of existing paintings made up only ten percent of what was originally found in earlier excavations, while another ten percent was only known through drawings and photos. For the first time, the team was able to show that Pompeii had indeed been over-excavated, and provide a comprehensive view of how, where, and to what extent conservation and restoration was needed.

With innovative advances in technology, conservationists and archaeologists have now been able to reconstruct navigable 3-D models of the ancient Pompeian buildings and the rooms that held the frescoes. Through virtual models, and the introduction of digital architectural line drawings, missing parts of the frescoes have been virtually filled in. The use of archival photographs of the frescoes from past excavations and reconstructions have also aided in the digital reconstruction of the paintings, and have allowed for their digital preservation for the future.

Lasers, ultrasound and thermal imagery have been used to analyze the frescoes and their level of deterioration. Non-invasive measurements have been used to research and measure the level of fading, discoloration, and changes in chemical composition that have taken place in the original pigments of the frescoes, such as: VIS (Visible Light) spectroscopy with CIE L*a*b* measurements and EDXRF (Energy-Dispersive X-Ray Fluorescence) analyses; OM (Optical Microscopy) of cross sections and paint layers; PLM (Polarized Light Microscopy) of powder samples; FTIR/ATR (Fourier Transform Infrared Spectroscopy/Attenuated Total Reflectance); and SEM-EDS (Scanning Electron Microscope-Energy Dispersive Spectrometry).

Extensive visitor observations and movement mapping have also been conducted in order to analyze how tourism impacts the safety of the frescoes.

== Agents of deterioration ==
=== Physical ===
During the beginning of the excavation of Pompeii, inexperienced and untrained excavators cut out pieces of fresco they found without the use of linen and other facing materials to protect the plaster, resulting in many frescoes being broken into multiple fragments. Wall painting scenes that were considered worthy of detachment were brought to the Palazzo degli Studi in Naples, today known as the Museo Archeologico Nazionale, after 1827.

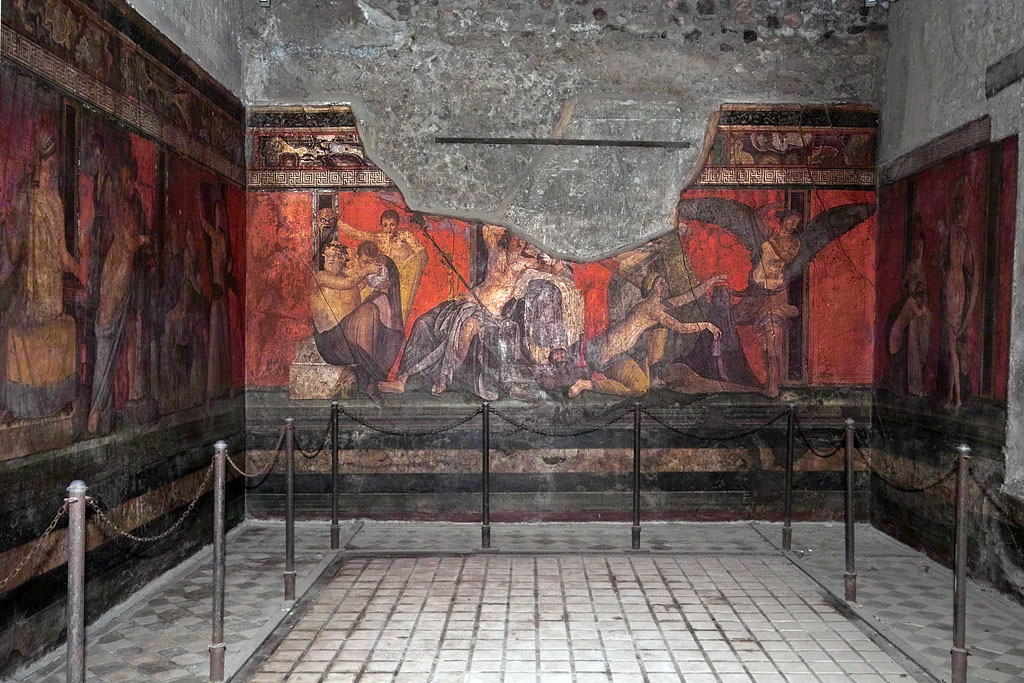
Roman fresco Villa dei Misteri Pompeii

The frescoes have been affected by rain and groundwater, which have caused water damage and rising damp, resulting in deteriorating and collapsing walls. Frescoes are part of an open physical system in which they are in contact with contiguous structures—such as walls, roofs, and the ground—that are dynamically involved in a series of chemical and physical events, such as the capillary movement and rise of moisture. Catastrophic physical forces such as earthquakes—which have been causing structural damage to the buildings and cracks in the walls since A.D. 62 —and the eruption of Mount Vesuvius, have contributed to the deterioration of the frescoes. The frescoes of Pompeii were both damaged by the eruption of Mount Vesuvius from heat and falling debris, which scratched and loosened the plaster and paint, and simultaneously preserved by the volcanic ash until their discovery. In addition, the frost of 1816 entirely destroyed murals in the Amphitheatre in the Villa of Cicero at the Praedia of Julia Felix.

Restoration efforts in the late eighteenth century resulted in poorly supported walls and masonry that have proven insufficient for the protection of the wall paintings and have contributed to their rapid degradation. Plaster was fixed with heavy metal clamps, which have gradually come away and left holes and other damage, and the edges of the paintings were smeared with ordinary mortar that has yet to be replaced.

Mass tourism that has taken place at Pompeii is another contributing factor to the deterioration of the frescoes. Wear and breakage have occurred due to people leaning on and touching the frescoes, as well as abrasions from bags and other objects rubbing against the frescoes in crowded areas. Vandals have also defaced the frescoes with graffiti. In addition, the frescoes at Pompeii have deteriorated due to poor management, decreased internal maintenance, and a lack of sustainable methods for restoration and conservation.

=== Chemical ===
The constituent materials of wall paintings have a high and open porosity. Because of this, they are easily accessible to liquids and gases including: salt solutions, atmospheric pollutants, water vapor, solutions of materials used for conservation, etc. Build-up from pollutants and contaminants such as waxes and gasoline—which were used in previous restoration attempts as cleaning agents—varnishes, and dust have caused the pigments in the frescoes to darken and discolor, and the figures to blur over time.

Many of the frescoes were covered with varnish to protect them at their creation, in which the fragments were first washed with water and then covered with gum arabic thinned with aqua regia. However, this practice was later stopped once it was discovered that it bleached and damaged the pigments, though most of the fragments at the Museo Archeologico Nazionale are still covered in the gluey film.

Experiments with hot wax were conducted by the ancient Pompeian painters. Painters either prepared the surfaces with melted wax or painted with pigments combined with wax that would then be burned into the plaster, which made them sturdy and durable. This same technique was tried in order to restore the frescoes in the late eighteenth century. While at first this made the paintings more lustrous and clear, years of heat and humidity and the restriction of normal evaporation for the paintings in situ turned the wax white and deteriorated the painted surfaces. In the Museo Archeologico Nazionale, though they didn't suffer from the same climatological effects, they still became white/crusty.

The pigments used in the frescoes are of a very fragile nature and have faded as a result of exposure to UV rays, oxygen, and the environment/elements—especially those left in situ. Disintegration of plaster, and lifting and detachment of the paint has also been caused by the crystallization of soluble salts, such as sodium nitrate, in the surface layers of the frescoes as a result of fluctuating temperatures and humidity, and exposure to atmospheric pollutants.

=== Biological ===
Invasive vegetation such as roots, moss, weeds, and grass have sprouted from the cracks in the eroded floors and walls of the rooms where the frescoes are located.

== Preventive conservation ==
Conservators and leadership are working to better understand the current situation of the Pompeian frescoes in order to avoid further damage and deterioration. The Soprintendenza Speciale per i Beni Archeologici di Napoli e Pompei is working on a major reorganization and implementation of new policies and maintenance plans for the entire site of Pompeii.

Attention has been given to non-intrusive and reversible reinforcement of the walls, structures and roofs of the buildings that house the frescoes. Recommendations have been made for the reconstruction of the building infrastructures using safe and sturdy materials, and light, modern supports, unlike the previous heavy materials placed in the walls, which caused significant damage. Recommendations have also been made for roof reinforcement structures and other conservation interventions that block ventilation and rain infiltration, and allow for humidity regulation to prevent the plaster of the frescoes from peeling off the walls. Plans for engineering new drainage and sewer systems are also being made.

Excavations of Pompeii have been significantly reduced, and barricades, fences, and locked doors have been placed to keep visitors out of vulnerable areas and buildings. Select insulae are also being considered for re-burial in order to protect them from further vegetal growth, weather conditions, earthquake damage, and volcanic eruptions.

As an open, reactive system, frescoes require more surveillance after conservation The use of high-tech monitoring tools is also being put into place. An agreement was made with Italian technology and defense company, Finmeccanica, for their donation of services concerning: protection of the artistic heritage from deterioration, pollution, hydrogeological and seismic risks; efficiency, sustainability and safety of the spaces dedicated to culture; and accessibility and fruition of the artistic heritage.

The project includes an interferometric monitoring service that provides data on the shifts/movements of the grounds and buildings in Pompeii, and comes equipped with radar sensors that shoot daytime and nighttime pictures. Finmeccanica has also provided a ground-based remote sensing service that employs hyper-spectral imaging devices for the acquisition of images and the spectral signatures of the various materials and chemical components present in areas identified as critical.

== Current conservation treatment techniques and methods ==
Efforts are being made to stabilize the frescoes' chemical and biological degradation and perform long-lasting restoration. In a holistic approach to conservation, the causes of decay are being addressed while increasing the site's ability to prevent or slow future decay. Routine cleaning of all previously restored works and constant upkeep practices are being put into place.

Conservators and restorers are meticulously stripping away layers of paraffin, dirt, and varnish with cotton swabs that restorers applied between the 1930s and 1970s to prevent the paints from cracking and flaking. Laser tools are being used to melt away wax and gasoline buildup while leaving the paint untouched. Other conservation treatments include the consolidation of brittle plaster and paint layers, the removal of inadequate inpainting of losses, and improving old fills that were used with cement.

== The Great Pompeii Project (Grande Progetto Pompei) ==
The Great Pompeii Project (GPP) is a €105 million project funded by the EU and Italian Government that began in 2012. The project proposes plans for emergency work to begin for the conservation, maintenance and restoration of Pompeii. The project's areas of intervention include:

- Surveying, investigating, and diagnosing critical structural and restoration problems for all insulae
- Investigations related to interventions for hydro-geological risk mitigation
- Safety and security measures, architectural restoration and decorative restoration
- Use and improvement of services and communication
- Technological reinforcement and capacity building

== See also ==
- Conservation and restoration of frescos
- Conservation issues of Pompeii and Herculaneum
- National Archaeological Museum, Naples
- Conservation-restoration of cultural heritage
- Conservation and restoration of immovable cultural property
- Conservation and restoration of outdoor artworks
