= Leaf painting =

Process of painting with dyed leaves

Leaf painting is the process of painting with dyed leaves. Deriving from Japan, China or India, it became popular in Vietnam. Its two main forms are: Cutting and pasting dry leaf to make leaf paintings or using paint to draw onto the surface of dry leaf to make leaf paintings.

Every product is unique, quite different from the others because of the leaves' veins, the forms, and the colors before or after dying.
