= Protoquadro =

Protoquadro is a painting technique conceived using digital supports to produce objects that will stand into a space as paintings used to. It pertains to the realm of Generative art.

Protoquadro objects have some characteristics of a painting and some of a totally new class of objects, therefore the name, formed by the Greek term "protos" (first) and the Italian "quadro" (painting).

The project was conceived by Federico Bonelli and Maurizio Martinucci in 2003 and developed thereafter through various collaborations. It produced a small number of protoquadros.

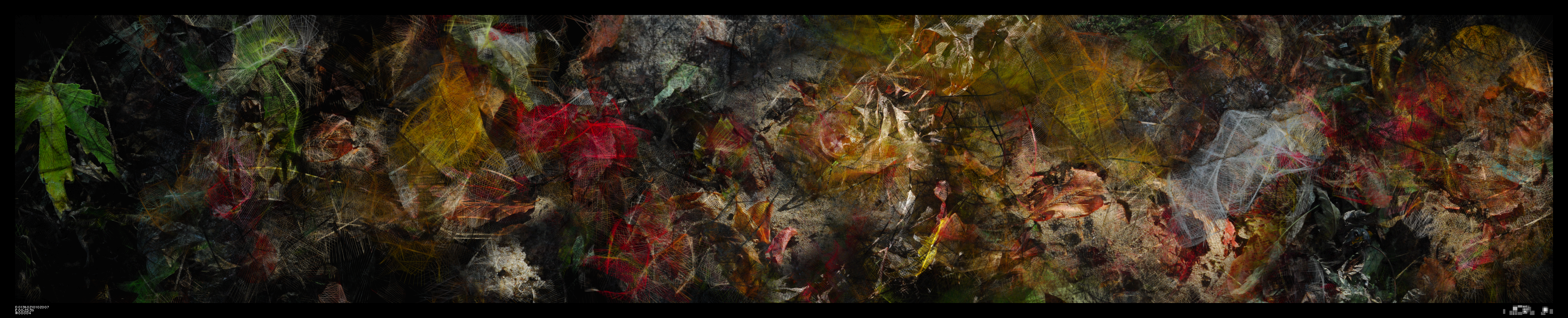
Protoquadro frame from Aut-Aut (2007)

All of these ideas are based on the concept of transformation through Synchronicity. The painting has to evolve in time, this evolution has to be connected to the situation where it was conceived and to the material chosen to compose it.

Existing Protoquadro are based on photographic material, a compositing idea and a rule of evolution.

Very relevant to the spirit of the existing objects has been the Italian Futurist painter Umberto Boccioni. He writes in his own book about painting:

"We synthesize all instants (of time, place, form, color-tone) and we build the painting upon them. And this painting, as an independent organism, has its own law, and the elements that made it obey to this law, creating as such, the similarity of the painting with itself"

(Umberto Boccioni, 1914)

== Algorithms ==
So far the algorithms invented and/or used for protoquadro have been:

NG# The NG# algorithms uses as an engine the geometrical properties of the Enneagram symbol. The Enneagram is used to generate sequences of values according to a feedback process that involves the color on the canvas in some peculiar points and in some determined instants of time.

SATOR# The project SATOR involved a research on magic squares. The original protoquadro called SATOR used the property of an order 5 magic square to generate the flow of numbers necessary to control the painting evolution.

BOIDS# used for a multiscreen installation called Junglescape, a specific variation of the boids algorithm, agents that responding to varying parameters create a wondering flock. The flock is aware of the presence of someone in the vicinity and reacts to it, splitting if the presence are two or more. Brushes are generated according to the flock behavior and heuristic rules chosen to massimize aesthetic effects. The original algorithms for drawing boids were developed by Craig Reynolds in 1986, is an artificial life program, simulating the flocking behaviour of birds.
