= Accidentalism (art) =

Accidentalism represents a loosely affiliated art movement related to assemblage, conceptual art and process art during the late 1980s and early 1990s. It is characterized by the interplay and tension between human systems and their physical instantiations often to surprising and humorous outcomes. Artists associated with the movement are Peter Fischli & David Weiss, Greg Colson, Terry Winters, and Tim Hawkinson.

== History ==
By the end of the 1980s, Fischli/Weiss had expanded their repertoire to embrace an iconography of the incidental, creating deadpan photographs of kitsch tourist attractions and airports around the world. For their contribution to the 1995 Venice Biennale, at which they represented Switzerland, Fischli/Weiss exhibited 96 hours of video on 12 monitors that documented what they called "concentrated daydreaming"—real-time glimpses into daily life in Zürich: a mountain sunrise, a restaurant chef in his kitchen, sanitation workers, a bicycle race, and so on. For the Skulptur Projekte Münster (1997), Fischli/Weiss planted a flower and vegetable garden conceived with an ecological point of view and documented its periodic growth through photographs.

In an early review of Colson’s 1988 “Accidental Non-Un-Intentionalism” exhibition at Angles Gallery, Brian Butler wrote in New Art Examiner, “The main feeling these works project is one of investigation, not completion. A visual/intellectual questioning – a search into the quality of meaning, object, and the environment – is the ultimate outcome.” The diagrams and maps Colson deploys speak to the detached, abstract quality of much human analysis, at the same time smuggling social critique into each work. Roberta Smith of The New York Times described Colson’s 1990 debut exhibition at Sperone Westwater Gallery: “In nearly all of Mr. Colson’s works, the combination of modesty and grandiosity, of mental exactness and physical imprecision adds up to an odd, sad beauty. Elliptical as they are, his pieces often seem to scrutinize the conflict between the active center and deserted margins of industrialized society.”

Throughout the 1990s and onward the scale of Winters’ work and its visual complexity has grown considerably. Continuing to take from the natural sciences and information systems, amongst other subject matters, the construction of his compositions has transitioned from occupied fields to plaited grids and networks that offer unpredictable images.

== Characteristics ==
Winters reforms his subjects to maintain their resonance and referentiality – what one sees in his compositions is ambiguously familiar – while waxing to an analog for the act of their making. Hawkinson tinkers with everyday materials to build surprising mechanical art works. “I guess it comes from early on in childhood, a fascination with moving parts and sort of the magical,” he suggests. In his studio, Hawkinson explains how he used gears, switches, nozzles, buckets, and pie tins to build a drumming machine that captures random drips of rain, amplifies them, and organizes them into music. “It’s not even electronics. I don’t know what it is,” he admits. One of Hawkinson’s largest projects, "Überorgan," is an inflatable installation in a space the size of a football field. For a version of the artwork the artists created a score for the organ using old church hymns.
