= List of Early Netherlandish painters =

This is an incomplete list of Early Netherlandish painters, referring to artists active in the Burgundian and Habsburg Netherlands during the 15th- and 16th-century Northern Renaissance period, once known as the Flemish Primitives. It flourished especially in the cities of Bruges, Ghent, Mechelen, Leuven, Tournai and Brussels, all in present-day Belgium. The period begins approximately with Robert Campin and Jan van Eyck in the 1420s and lasts at least until the death of Gerard David in 1523, although many scholars extend it to the start of the Dutch Revolt in 1566 or 1568–Max J. Friedländer's acclaimed surveys run through Pieter Bruegel the Elder.

Early Netherlandish painting coincides with the Early and High Italian Renaissance, but the early period (until about 1500) is seen as an independent artistic evolution, separate from the Renaissance humanism that characterised developments in Italy. Beginning in the 1490s, as increasing numbers of Netherlandish and other Northern painters traveled to Italy, Renaissance ideals and painting styles were incorporated into northern painting. As a result, Early Netherlandish painters are often categorised as belonging to both the Northern Renaissance and the Late or International Gothic.

== Artists ==
- Jean Malouel (died 1415)
- Hubert van Eyck (c. 1385–1426)
- Robert Campin, also called Master of Flemalle (1378–1444)
- Henri Bellechose (died c. 1445)
- Jan van Eyck (c. 1390–1441)
- Dirk Bouts (c. 1400/1415–1475)
- Rogier van der Weyden (c. 1399/1400–1464)
- Petrus Christus (c. 1410/1420–1475/1476)
- Joos van Wassenhove also called Justus of Ghent (c. 1410–1480), later one of the few Northern artists who worked in Italy
- Jacques Daret (c. 1404–1470)
- Barthélemy d'Eyck (c. 1420–1470), worked in Southern France
- Vrancke van der Stockt (c. 1420–1495)
- Simon Marmion (c. 1425–1489)
- Hans Memling (c. 1430–1494), born in Germany
- Hugo van der Goes (1440–1482)
- Hieronymus Bosch (c. 1450–1516)
- Gerard David (c. 1460–1523)
- Jan Joest van Calcar (c. 1450–1519)
- Albert van Ouwater (1444–1515)
- Michael Sittow (c. 1469–1525), born in Estonia, worked in Flanders and Spain, possibly visiting England
- Quentin Matsys (1466–1529)
- Juan de Flandes (c. 1460–c. 1519), born in Flanders, active in Spain
- Geertgen tot Sint Jans (c. 1460–1490)
- Joachim Patinir (c. 1480–1524), the first specialist landscape painter
- Jean Hey, also called Master of Moulins (active 1480–1500)
- Master of the Legend of Saint Lucy (active 1480–1510)
- Master of the Embroidered Foliage (active 1480–1510)
- Master of the Holy Blood (c. 1500–1525)

== Sources ==
- Ainsworth, Maryan. "Religious Painting from 1500 to 1550". Maryan Ainsworth, et al. (eds.), From Van Eyck to Bruegel: Early Netherlandish Painting in the Metropolitan Museum of Art. New York: Metropolitan Museum, 1998b. ISBN 0-87099-870-6
- Borchert, Till-Holger. Van Eyck to Dürer: The Influence of Early Netherlandish painting on European Art, 1430–1530. London: Thames & Hudson, 2011. ISBN 978-0-500-23883-7
- Campbell, Lorne. The Fifteenth-Century Netherlandish Paintings. London: National Gallery, 1998. ISBN 0-300-07701-7
- Friedländer, Max J. From Van Eyck to Bruegel. (First pub. in German, 1916), London: Phaidon, 1981. ISBN 0-7148-2139-X
- Harbison, Craig. "The Art of the Northern Renaissance". London: Laurence King Publishing, 1995. ISBN 1-78067-027-3
- Nash, Susie. Northern Renaissance art. Oxford: Oxford University Press, 2008. ISBN 0-19-284269-2
- Pächt, Otto. Early Netherlandish Painting from Rogier van der Weyden to Gerard David. New York: Harvey Miller, 1997. ISBN 1-872501-84-2
- Spronk, Ron. "More than Meets the Eye: An Introduction to Technical Examination of Early Netherlandish Paintings at the Fogg Art Museum". Harvard University Art Museums Bulletin, Volume 5, No. 1, Autumn 1996
