= Fedoskino miniature =

Traditional Russian lacquer miniature painting on papier-mâché

Coordinates: 56°03′17″N 37°35′01″E

Fedoskino miniature (Russian: федоскинская миниатюра) is a traditional Russian lacquer miniature painting on papier-maché, named after its original center Fedoskino (Федоскино), an old village near Moscow widely known from the late 18th century. The contemporary Fedoskino painting preserves the typical features of Russian folk art.

The use of oil paint, typically applied in many layers, is a distinctive feature of a Fedoskino miniature, as well as the use of mother-of-pearl, pure gold or silver leaf under segments of the background to create the effect of a shimmering glow or silvery sparkle. Many boxes are painted inside and outside in imitation tortoiseshell, birch bark, mahogany or tartan.

The heyday of Fedoskino miniature fell in the second half of the 19th century, and the works of that time are known as "lukutins", named after the merchants Lukutins, who owned the Fedoskino factory at that time. Petr Lutukin inherited the factory in 1824 and it remained in the families ownership until 1904. After a brief interlude in the hands of former Lutukin workers ("The Fedoskino Artel of Former Lutukin Factory Workers") the factory effectively ceased trading until after the revolution, when in 1923, Fedoskino wares were awarded a diploma for "superb artistic skill" at the All Union Exhibition of Agricultural, Industrial and Cultural Products; which was held in Moscow in that year. Some of the factory craftsmen had artistic education, and many of them had come from icon-painting studios.

In 1931 the opening of a vocational school of miniature painting at Fedoskino ensured the perpetuation of the art form, which allowed the continued development through the following years. Stylistically the Fedoskino factory is distinct from the other schools of miniature lacquer painting: notably those of Palekh, Mstera and Kholui.

The popular motifs used in Fedoskino miniature are all sorts of tea-drinking with samovar, troikas (carriage-and-three), and scenes from Russian peasant life.
