= Freehand brush work =

Style of painting

Freehand brush work is a genre of Chinese traditional painting which includes poem, calligraphy, painting and seal. In Chinese, it is called Hsieh yi (traditional Chinese: 寫意; simplified Chinese: 写意; pinyin: Xiěyì), which literally means "writing ideas". It was formed in a long period of artistic activities and promoted by the literati. Through the inheritance and development in the past dynasties, freehand brush work has gradually become the most influential and popular genre.

The freehand brush work emphasizes the semblance in the spiritual aspect. This kind of artwork does not chase for the physical similarity and the cooperation of reality. And it might be the essence of freehand brush work that it mostly grasps the most obvious or essential spiritual characteristics. The first rule of freehand brush work is the use of connotation which is a kind of spiritual meaning. It focuses on the personality and the cooperation of every element in the painting.

== Tools ==
There are four main tools used in the process of creating freehand brush work – ink brush, ink slab, inks and Xuan paper.

=== Ink brush ===
Ink brush is made of the branch of bamboo and the fur of weasel or goat. There are different sizes of ink brush and in freehand brush work, what is commonly used is the large size for it suits this painting style better. And the fur can be divided into three kinds – soft, hard and both – according to the elasticity. The soft type is made of fur of goat and the hard type is made of the weasel’s fur. And there is also a type that combines the two types of fur together and reach a balanced effect.

=== Ink slab ===
Ink slab is a stone container used to hold the ink. By pouring clean water into it and slowly rubbing with congealed ink, the ink slab can be filled with ink. In addition to holding the ink, it has another function of appreciating. Some of the Chinese ink slabs are delicately carved and those exquisite ink slabs are seen as artworks that worth collecting.

=== Ink ===
The ink is the most important element that determines the effect of the painting. The use of ink can date back to ancient China. Traditionally, ink is used along with the ink slab and columnar congealed ink. But with the growing convenience of preserving liquid ink, nowadays people prefer the easier way of using ink. Mostly we mix water and ink together to get the shade proper.

=== Xuan paper ===
Xuan paper is a special kind of paper that can absorb the ink and water. There are raw paper and ripe paper under this type and each kind has particular function for Chinese traditional painting. Raw paper is the main material of free hand brush work for it has better absorbency and is more solid.

=== Technique ===
Compared to other genres, freehand brush work is more random, because it does not pay too much attention on the similarity. This character makes it a genre that is both easiest and most difficult.

There is little sense of space consciousness which the western has in Chinese traditional painting. It is organized by different use of ink. With the power of the brush reinforced, the shades get deeper and darker. The relation between two objects is also depicted in an abstract way. So you may see a scene that in which two people has different size of body. Sometimes it might be exaggeration and sometimes it is related to the connotation under the scene.

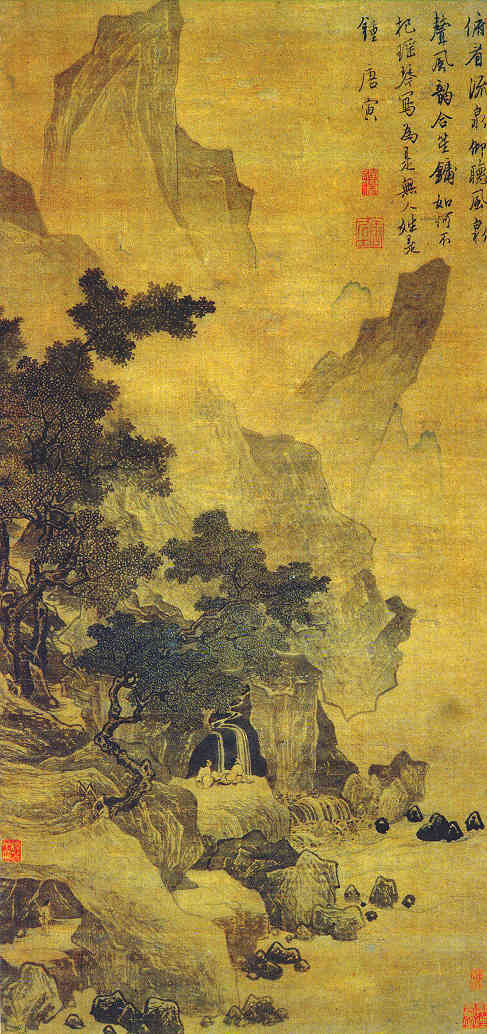
Tang Yan's artwork of landscape

What is most important that a painting aims to express is the artistic conception. By depicting all the contents in a scene, the painter can finally achieve an atmosphere in which the relations, colors, positions and all the other elements are able to convey spiritual consideration. And that is the deep value of appreciating freehand brush work.

=== Branches ===
The freehand brush work can be divided into branches according to the material and content.

For the material, there are two branches.

==== With Ink ====
Ink is a significant tool used to create a freehand brush work, especially in Chinese paintings. Ink paintings are conducted with a liquid of pigments or dyes and then be applied to color a surface to create an image. This genre merely consists of two common colors: black and white varying in thickness of the ink, composition and padding. Thick ink is used for the chief or highlighted parts while light one for subordinate parts.

==== With water color ====
Watercolor is a conjugate usage of water and colors. It is a special method with transparent colors in which one layer being covered by another layer to create extraordinary visual effects. Watercolor pencils may be used either wet or dry. It is often used in fresh and bright paintings. It requires skillful and specialized application of proportion of water and color and ways to appear a sense of texture. Compared to ink painting, it has vibrant colors and being more expressive bringing greater visual impact.

For the content, there are also two branches.

==== Figure ====
A freehand figure painting is a work of art with the primary subject being the human figures. The kind of figure painting is totally different from the realistic figure painting. The former concentrate more on infectious emotion, connotation and spirits of a figure and artistic conception rather than depict a vivid figure by using fine Brush work skill to the details. In general, a freehand figure masterpiece shows the rough and vague outline of a figure with features depicted by one or two simple strokes, conveying rich and distinctive connotation and spirits or themes. Some artists well known for this kind of freehand painting are Xu Bei-hong and Fan Zeng.

==== Scenery ====
Natural scene is a comprehensively major factor of freehand brush work with two subordinates of flowers-and-birds as well as landscape. Both of them are aimed at expressing creators’ emotions through describing certain scenery. The former one often presents merely one or two birds perching or flying around a certain type of flowers or plants wearing various expressions or showing different gestures related to paintings’ theme. The same as flowers and birds, landscape freehand works convey painters’ inner ideas and pursuit through abstract image with combination of natural landscape.
