= Accidentalism (painting) =

Effect produced by accidental lights

In painting, accidentalism is the effect produced by accidental lights.
