= Licked finish =

A Girl Defending Herself Against Eros, by William-Adolphe Bouguereau, reflects the licked finish style; the brushstrokes are as invisible as possible.

A licked finish is the surface of an oil painting that has been smoothed and the brushstrokes blended to such an extent that the evidence of the artist's hand is no longer visible. The technique is strongly identified with French academic art. It was codified by the French Academy in the eighteenth century in order to distinguish 'professional' art from that produced by amateurs.

Jean Auguste Dominique Ingres summed up the academic technique: "The brushstroke, as accomplished as it may be, should not be visible: otherwise, it prevents the illusion, immobilizes everything. Instead of the object represented, it calls attention to the process: instead of the thought, it betrays the hand."

Rejection of the licked finish in favour of visible brushstrokes is one of the hallmarks of Impressionism.
