= East Greek vase painting =

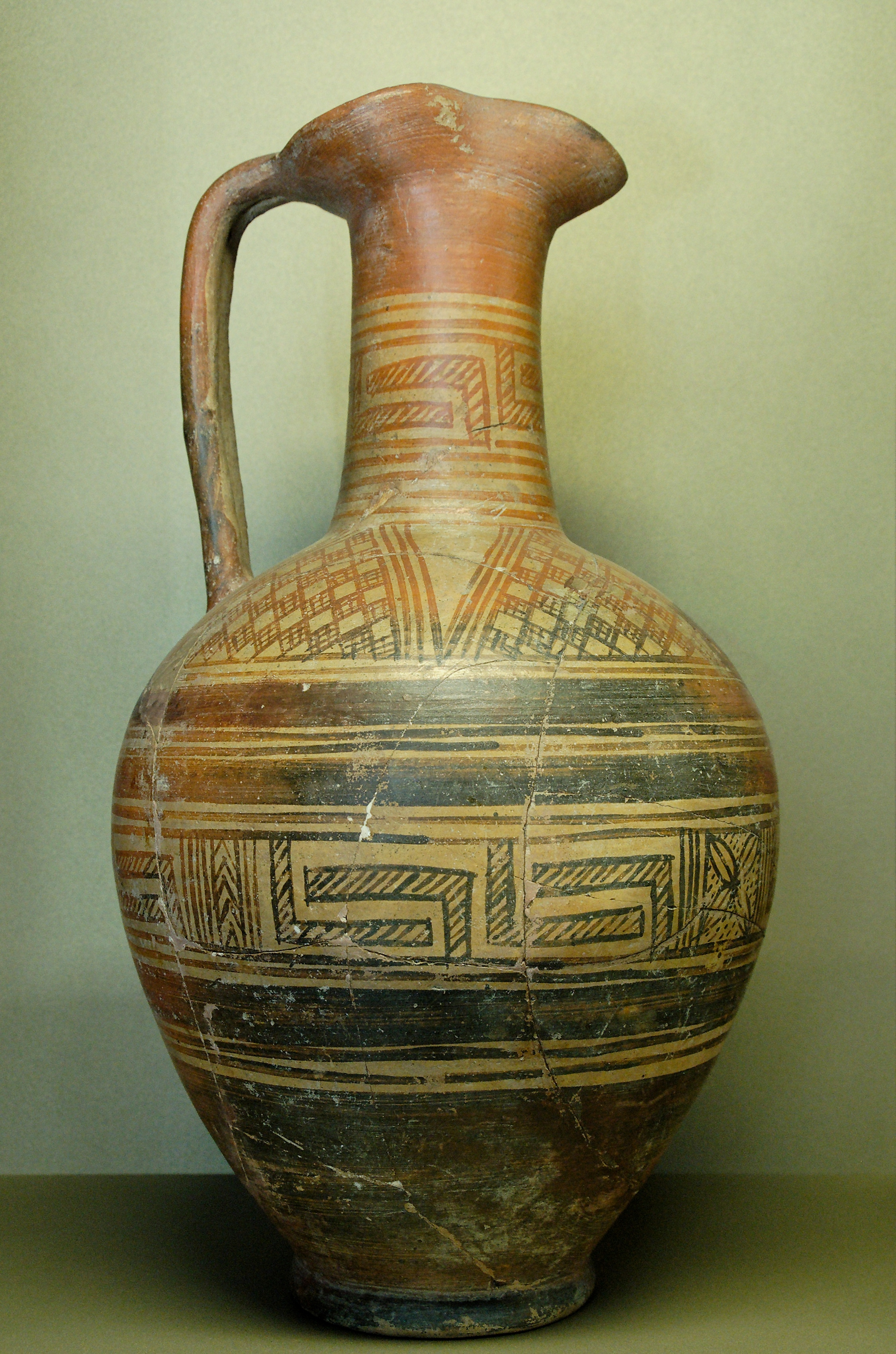
Rhodian Geometric oinochoe by the Bird and Zigzag Painter, 740/720 BC. Paris: Louvre.

East Greek vase painting was a regional style of ancient Greek vase painting, produced by the eastern Greeks (Ionia and the islands of the eastern Aegean Sea). In spite of the region's wealth, the pottery was rather unremarkable in comparison to other areas. The clay is red-brown to pink and often contains mica inclusions. Many regional sub-styles of East Greek pottery existed.

East Greek Geometric vase painting, starting in the Middle Geometric period, shows a strong influence by Attic vase painting. Especially on Kos, this is notable at an early stage. The shape of lekythoi also indicates a Cypriot influence. Rhodes also produced large vases, including tall-footed kraters. The distinguishing feature of East Greek vase painting were diagonally hatched meanders, triangles and rhomboids. Later, waterfowl were added as a motif. The Attic system of metope-like panes was also adopted, but abandoned soon after. By the end of the Geometric period, vases were often covered in a white slip, onto which the paint was applied.

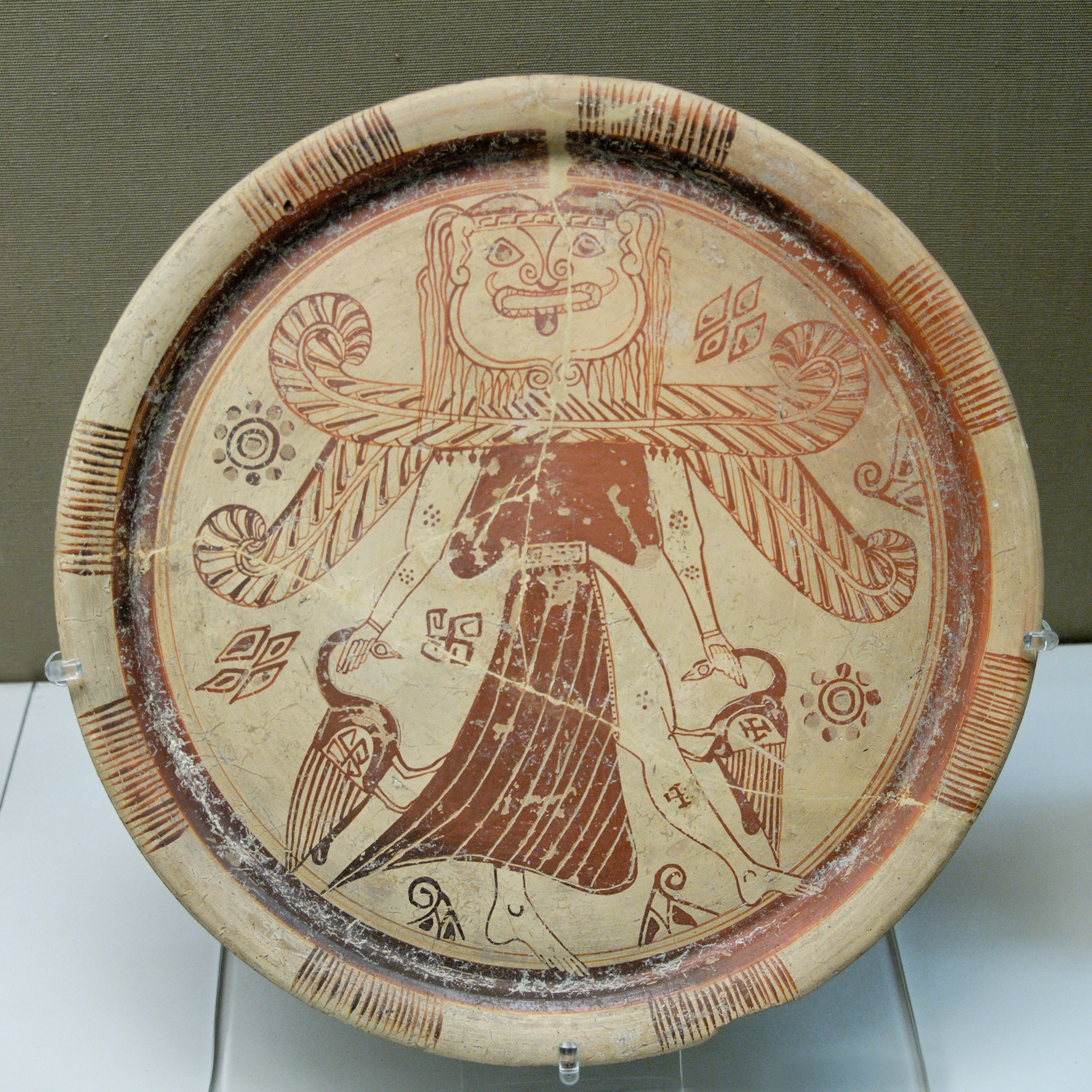
Rhodian orientalising plate "Rhodian plate", circa 600 BC. London: British Museum.

Until the 7th century BC, Geometric shapes were continued within the Subgeometric style. This style lasted much longer here than in other Greek regions. Only by about 650 BC was it replaced with an orientalising animal style. This began initially at or near Miletus; a second centre developed after about 625 BC on Chios. The decorational system of this animal style is named after the most commonly depicted creature, the Wild Goat style. Until 600 BC, vase painting relied entirely on painted silhouettes and reservations, than, beginning in northern Ionia, incision (black-figure style) started to spread. The animal frieze style was quite decorative, but allowed little scope for further development. Especially in Ionian vase painting, regional styles now began to develop.

== Bibliography ==
- Thomas Mannack: Griechische Vasenmalerei. Eine Einführung. Theiss, Stuttgart 2002, p. 81f., 90-94, 134f.. ISBN 3-8062-1743-2.
- Gerald P. Schaus: Geometrische Vasenmalerei, In: Der Neue Pauly, Vol. 4 (1998), Col. 935-938
- Johannes Schwind: Orientalisierende Vasenmalerei, In: Der Neue Pauly, Vol. 9 (2000), Col. 23-26
- Matthias Steinhart: Schwarzfigurige Vasenmalerei II. Ausserattisch, In: Der Neue Pauly, Vol. 11 (2001), Col. 276-281
