= Hang =

Hang or Hanging may refer to:

== People ==
- Choe Hang (disambiguation), various people
- Luciano Hang (born 1962/1963), Brazilian billionaire businessman
- Ren Hang (disambiguation), various people
- Hang (surname), Chinese surname (杭)

== Law ==
- Hanging, a form of capital punishment

== Arts, entertainment, and media ==
=== Artwork ===
- Hanging craft, a decorative or symbolic hanging object
- Hanging scroll, a type of decorative art

=== Music ===
- Hang (Foxygen album), a 2017 album by the indie rock band Foxygen
- Hang (Lagwagon album), an album by the punk band Lagwagon
- "Hang", a song by Avail from their 1996 album 4am Friday
- "Hang out with You", a 2016 song recorded by American singer-songwriter Mary Lambert
- "Hang", a song by Matchbox Twenty from their album Yourself or Someone Like You
- Hang (instrument), a musical instrument
- "A Hanging", a song by Swans from the 1986 album Holy Money

== Other uses ==
- Meat hanging, a form of beef aging
- Hang (computing), a computer malfunction
- Hangeul (ISO 15924 code)
- "Hang in there, Baby", a popular catchphrase and motivational poster
- Hang On (disambiguation), multiple meanings
- Hanging topic, a linguistics concept in the information structure of a sentence

== See also ==
- Google Hangouts, a Google communication service
- Hangnail (disambiguation)
- Limited hangout, or partial hangout, a spy term
