= Distressing =

Treating objects to look older and used

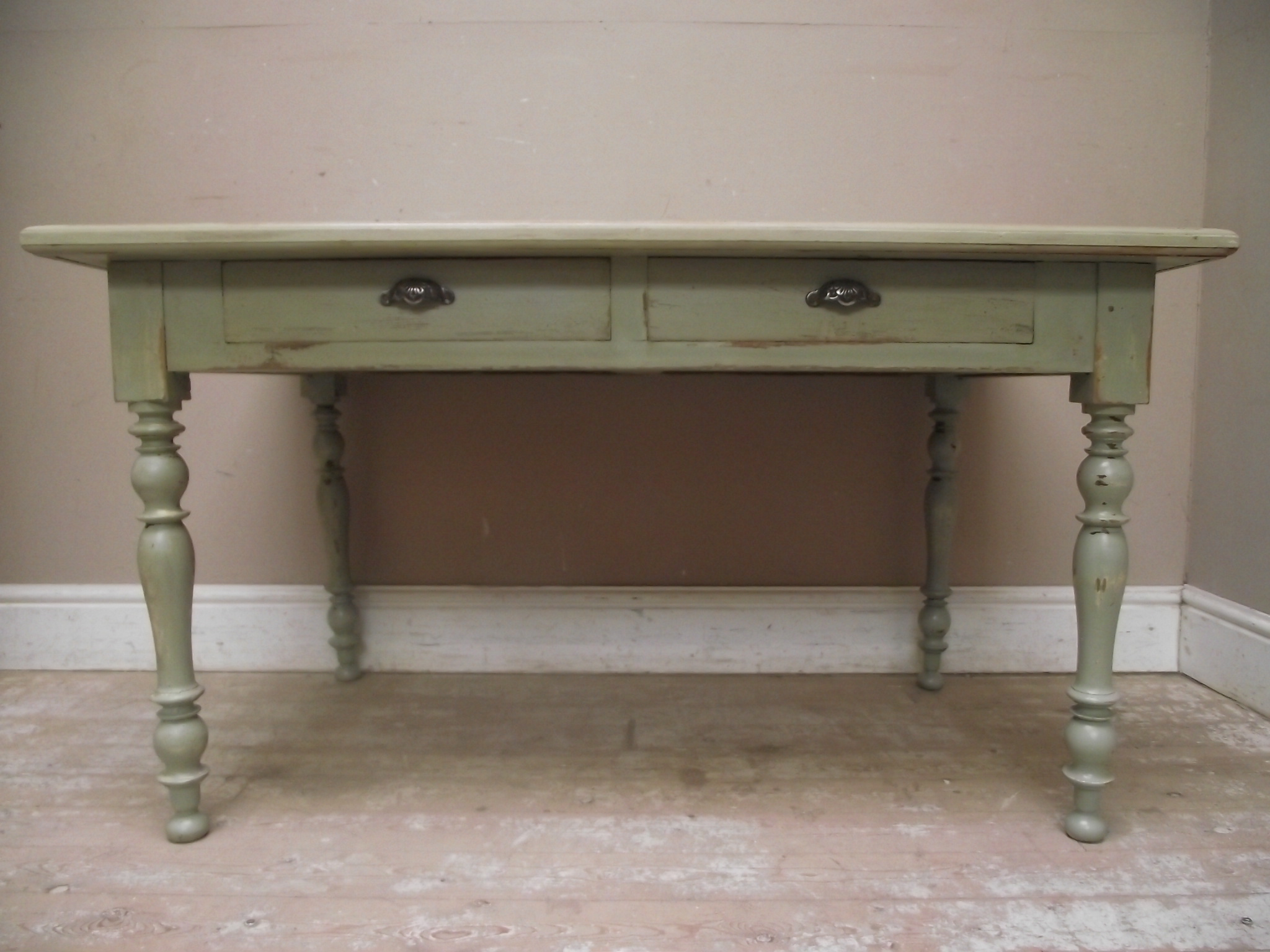
A table given a distressed finish, with a historical paint colour, edges that have been sanded down to expose the wood, and vintage hardware attached to the drawers.

Distressing (or weathered look) in the decorative arts is the activity of making a piece of furniture or object appear aged and older, giving it a "weathered look". There are many methods to produce an appearance of age and wear. Distressing is viewed as a refinishing technique although it is the opposite of finishing in a traditional sense. In distressing, the object's finish is intentionally destroyed or manipulated to look less than perfect, such as with sandpaper or paint stripper. For example, the artisan often removes some but not all of the paint, leaving proof of several layers of paint speckled over wood grain underneath. This becomes the "finished" piece.

Distressing has become a popular design style and decorative art form. The artisan attempts a rustic, attractive, one-of-a-kind appearance or vintage look. The final appearance is often called the patina.

Distressing can be applied to a variety of surfaces and materials such as wood, glass, metal, plastic, stone, concrete, plaster, and paint. Solid pine furniture in particular is one of the most ideal furniture types to apply distressing to. The Shabby chic style has made both distressing and antiquing popular. The technique is sometimes applied to electric guitars, where it is referred to as relic'ing.

Various tools and accessories have simplified the distressing technique, such as a double-headed mallet or chisel style shaft having threaded interchangeable metal heads with molded impressions such as worm holes, screw threads, chain dents, etc.

== Antiquing ==
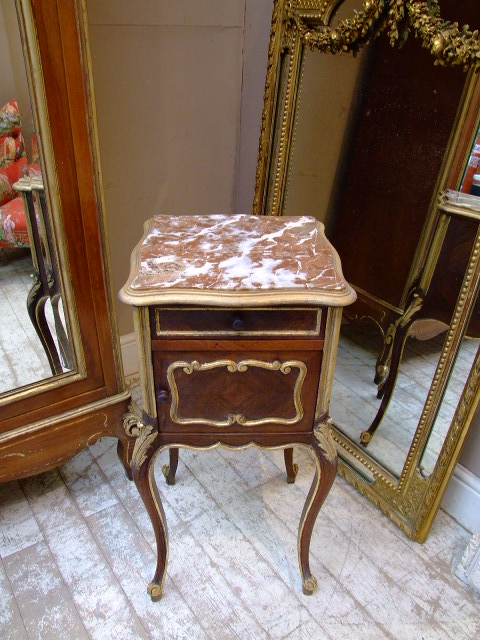
A table given an antiqued appearance resembling Florentine-style woodwork, with gold paint applied to carved details to resemble gilding.

Antiquing is a more involved form of distressing where the artisan intends to not only age a piece, but also create an antique appearance.

In addition to distressing the finish, the artisan may reapply historical paint colors, antique-like faux finish and crackle varnishes. They might also apply period accent details, such as antique knobs on dresser drawers.

Several methods involve glazes in which colors blend into crevices to give an antique appearance. The antiquing process is time-consuming and normally requires many steps to obtain the appearance of an aged and worn finish.

In the mass-produced furniture market, it is common for 'distressing' to include faux woodworm holes. These can easily be distinguished from real woodworm holes (as might be present on a genuine antique) as faux woodworm holes will usually be all of identical diameter and vertical into the wood. Genuine woodworm holes, on the other hand, would be of varying diameter and usually not perfectly vertical.

== Techniques ==
The artisan may deliberately sand, dent, and scrape the finish off of furniture or objects. Wood can be hammered softer, or dimpled, bleached, pickled, stained or repainted with crackling paints and varnishes. Antiquing paints and varnishes are available at craft stores or can be mixed at home. New layers of paint can be watered down before they are applied to allow the wood and other layers to show through or to look more like white washing. Layers of paint of varnishes can be sponged on to create an uneven pattern. After any new paint or layers are applied, the corners and features can be painted slightly lighter or sanded down as desired to appear worn. Steel wool can be treated with vinegar to create an acid oxide, then brushed across a stripped and sanded surface of the piece to create a vintage stain effect. In addition, the following antiquing techniques can be used:

- Decoupage
- Gold leaf and Gilding
- Graining and combing
- Texturizing
- Trompe-l'œil
- Liver of sulfur
- Verdigris
- Wood stain
- Chalk distressing

== See also ==
- Aging (artwork)
- Applied patina
- Faux painting
- List of art techniques
- Refinishing
- Shabby chic
- Stone wash
- Wood finishing
