= Rag painting =

Creating surface finish with rags

Rag painting or ragging is a form of faux painting using paint thinned out with glaze and old rags to create a lively texture on walls and other surfaces.

Example of the ragging design with a stencil

Ragging can be done as a negative or positive technique. The former involves rolling glaze over the entire surface, and removing it with clean rags to reveal the underlying paint color in a pleasing textural pattern. The latter is accomplished by applying glaze directly to the wall with a rag, and creates a similar pattern. Ragging is a very adaptable finish that can be used in a variety of areas, creating the illusion of an old world texture, but on a flat surface that can be easily painted over.

Ragging can be done in a variety of patterns, including rag rolling, in which the rags are twisted together and then rolled over a wet glazed surface creating the illusion of fabrics such as velvet or silk. Ragging is also often used as a pattern underneath stenciling.

== See also ==
- Strie
- Color wash
- Venetian plaster
