= Conservation and restoration of movable cultural property =

Form of conservation

Conservation and restoration of movable cultural property is a term used to denote the conservation of movable cultural property items in libraries, archives, museums and private collections. Conservation encompasses all the actions taken toward the long-term preservation of cultural heritage. Activities include examination, documentation, treatment, and preventive care, which is supported by research and education. Object conservation is specifically the actions taken to preserve and restore cultural objects. The objects span a wide range of materials from a variety of cultures, time periods, and functions. Object conservation can be applied to both art objects and artifacts. Conservation practice aims to prevent damage from occurring, a process known as 'preventive conservation'. The purpose of preventive conservation is to maintain, and where possible enhance, the condition of an object, as well as managing deterioration risks, such as handling and environmental conditions. Historically, object conservation was focused on the category of fine arts but now many different types of objects are conserved. Each type of object material, typically denoted by organic or inorganic then the specific medium, requires a specialized professional conservator and often requires collaborative work between museum staff, scientists, and conservators.

Object conservation involves the Conservation-restoration and preservation of a physical object. This type of conservator is differentiated from other specialists because they treat a broad range of objects and material types. This classification of material includes archaeological, ethnographic, historical, sculpture, decorative arts, and contemporary art.

== History ==
Object conservation has been around ever since people have been amassing and assembling collections for others to enjoy. Conservation in its early history was conducted by skilled craftsman and tradesman who could repair and return the objects back into a useful working or exhibition condition. Over time, object conservation as a profession has developed to the point where specialization for objects and the materials out of which they are made have become the standard of modern conservation. Conservation skills are now being taught at institutions such as the master's degree program in art conservation at Winterthur and the University of Delaware, located in Newark, Delaware. This is an intensive three-year program, with facilities including conservation studios, laboratories, examination rooms and workshops available to students and faculty. These are housed in the Louise E. du Pont Crowninshield Research Building at Winterthur.

== Causes of deterioration ==
Water causes damage and results from natural occurrences, technological hazards, or mechanical failures. Many cases of water damage can be traced to accidents or neglect. "A great many of the materials that museum objects are made of are highly susceptible to contact with water and can be severely damaged by even brief contact, while others may be exposed to water for longer periods without harm. This situation is complicated by the combination and range of materials that may comprise each object. In addition, the vulnerability of individual objects to water can be affected (i.e. increased) significantly by the state of the degradation of the materials." Water damage causes a variety of preservation concerns, including but not limited to: discoloration, cracking, softening, matting, distortion, mold growth, delamination, and swelling.

Fire is a risk to both objects and their collections, both humans and inanimate objects. Museums, libraries, archives and private collections are vulnerable to fire from a number of internal and external sources. Most museum fires begin as a result of human neglect and carelessness, or are intentionally set. Damage to objects can be irreparable or can be mitigated due to storage choices (like being in a glass case), the object's material(organic materials are more prone to damage), or safety precautions that the museum has invested in. Fires also create soot deposits which can cause discoloration, dull surface textures, and permanently alter objects.

Light fades materials. Colors that fade can disappear within as little as a few hours of direct sunshine, or just a few years at low museum lighting. But some types of objects are more fade resistant due to their specific materials. Ultraviolet light causes yellowing, chalking, weakening, and/or disintegration of materials. Infrared light heats the surface of objects, which is a form of incorrect temperature. Different deterioration phenomena often occur simultaneously.

Inappropriate temperature is another source of deterioration. There are several ways that temperature can cause object degradation. One being that the temperature is too high: this excess heat can cause chemical, physical, and biological phenomena. The most important phenomena for museums and archives is chemical: normal room temperatures are much too high for the long-term preservation of unstable human made materials, especially those carrying images, sound, and text. Another problem arise when temperature is too low. Overall, low temperature is beneficial to collections, but polymeric materials, such as paints, become more brittle and fragile. Some objects contain materials that will deform and weaken, or even melt, above a certain temperature.

Inappropriate relative humidity effects a wide range of object materials and storage solutions. Relative humidity is the quality of the air that ranges between damp and dry, which causes damage to objects. Damp is when the relative humidity is over 75%. Damp causes several types of deterioration: mold, rapid corrosion, and extreme forms of mechanical damage. Mold damages any form of organic material.

Physical forces are the results of both direct and indirect actions that impact both objects and their surroundings. "Physical force can damage objects directly by causing rotation, deformation, stress, and pressure. It may also damage objects indirectly by causing collision between objects or object parts. Damage from physical force ranges from imperceptible hairline fissures and minute losses, to large-scale effects such as crushing objects, collapsing floors, and, in extreme cases, destroying buildings. Five important force-related effects are: impact; shock; vibration; pressure; and abrasion."

Dissociation is an immaterial form of damage, rather than something physically done to an object. Damage can occur as: rare and catastrophic single events resulting in extensive loss of data, objects, or object values; sporadic and severe events occurring every few years or decades resulting in loss of data, objects, or object values; and continual events or processes resulting in loss of data, objects, or object values. Object conservation depends on objects remaining in well cared for environments with up to date records and locations. Dissociation can happen both as a direct consequence of actions, like removing a label tag or making errors in records, as well failing to perform actions, like not applying object numbers with permanent materials or not meeting legal requirements to prove ownership of an object.

Dust and chemical pollution is present in most environments, even in enclosed areas. "Pollutants are grouped into a range of compounds that can have chemical reactions with any component of an object. Pollutants can be gases, aerosols, liquids or solids of either anthropogenic or natural origin, and they are substances that are known to have adverse effects (negative consequences) on objects. Deposits of solid particles are considered pollutants, and while they may not necessarily cause damage, they are recognized as altering the aesthetic aspects of the objects. In some cases, fine particles deposited on an object's surface can be strongly bonded."

Burglars, thieves and vandals can completely remove an object from the control of an institution while either destroying it or damaging it in a wide variety of ways. Like dissociation, this cause of deterioration is much harder to control due to the institution's ability to address vulnerabilities in their facilities, security measures, or visitors. There are many systems of control that help to prevent theft and vandalism from ever occurring.

Pests are defined by the "National Park Service (NPS) Management Policies(2006) section 4.4.5.1 defines a pest as "an organism that interferes with the management objective of the site." For museums, a pest is defined as any organism that jeopardizes museum resources." Pests can include but are not limited to rodents, insects, and birds. An effective Museum integrated pest management program plays an integral and necessary part of every museum's collection care policy. Routine collections inspections can detect and reveal the presence of pests within the museum's buildings and storage areas. Common ways of reducing risks posed by pests are to reduce or eliminate food and water opportunities which provide an attractive lure for pests.

== Item materials and types ==
Item materials vary from organic, inorganic, and composite objects. Depending on the material being handled with for storage or needing conservation treatment, the conservator specializing in the specific type or range of objects is considered prior to treatment. According to the Code of Ethics Conservators are to only proceed treatment with care and complete understanding of the material. Organic objects can involve "plastics, leather, feathers, bone, horn, ivory, hair, wood, and other plant and animal materials, including natural history specimens", and inorganic materials consists of "metals, glass, and ceramic materials and stone". Composite objects are a mix of mediums that involve both inorganic and organic materials.

=== Organic ===
Leather is a type of organic object that is prone to deterioration when exposed to "microorganisms, atmospheric gases, strong light, and extremes and fluctuations of humidity". Because of their vulnerability, these types of objects require persistent attention. Special treatment is needed for objects of leather if restoration of their original state is desired. For example, when leather is exposed to mold, the object should be treated with a vacuum and or alcohol if it has been tested that there is no discoloration or transferring of color.

Wood is another type of material that is identified as organic. Wood is a very absorbing material based on its environment. Thus, depending on the amount of water that is exposed in the air, the wood can expand and contract easily, changing the physical condition of the object. This is the reason why wood material needs to be kept in a high controlled and consistent temperature and humidity levels. A too high relative humidity can cause wood to swell, and a too low relative humidity can cause the wood Bending or twisting, as well as the appearance of cracks and cracks. Extreme fluctuations of both can speed the deterioration process of the wooden object. With high relative humidity, wood is also prone to pests. An example of treatment would be to freeze the objects to kill any pests that may have been existing within.

=== Inorganic ===
Ceramics is a type of an inorganic object. Treatment for such objects can vary depending on the purpose of the use or its stability. When ceramics are broken and need restoration either because it is needed to be displayed on exhibition or for the stability of the object when used for examination or study, some type of techniques can include but may not be limited to gap fills, inpainting, restructuring, and polishing can be used for treatments.

Types of metals include "gold, silver, copper, iron, lead, tin, nickel, zinc, aluminum, chromium, titanium, and their alloys". Metal sculptures are prone to corrosion from air pollution and moisture in the air. Interventive treatments for metals is an irreversible procedure that need consideration prior to work. Such types of treatment include cleaning involving chemicals or tools such as Nd:YAG laser that can effectively remove layers of built-up "calcareous and siliceous encrustation"

=== Composite ===
Composite items are made up of individual materials referred to as constituent materials. There are two main categories of constituent materials: matrix (binder) and reinforcement. At least one portion of each type is required. When combined, composite objects may take on properties and characteristics which differ from the properties of the original materials.

Testing material from composite objects is a vital tool to help reduce or prevent further deterioration from inherent vice (the innate tendency of an object or material to decay). Not all objects will be treated because of the purpose of the object, or the intention of the artist. Consideration of the history of the object and the artist's intentions are heavily weighed prior to any treatment or testing of materials. Some example of materials which produce chemical reactions, causing physical changes to the object are silver and wood. This is because wood is known to emit acetic acid (ethanoic acid) that becomes a pollutant to the silver, causing it to tarnish at a faster rate. If corrosion of metals are considered for testing, the Oddy test is "an accelerated corrosion test for effects on metals" Certain cases such as the Necklace from Somalia, the British Museum had run tests for the yellow beads and the silver alloy that link the components into a necklace. The test was in fact able to conclude that the yellow beads were exposing nitric acid to the silver only allowing corrosion to the metal over time. Thus, the necklace had to be removed from the different components and stored detached in order to reduce rapid decaying of the object.

== Preventive conservation ==
In order to preserve objects for the future, museums, libraries, and other collecting institutions utilize preventive conservation practices. Prof. Ziad al-Saad, Professor of Cultural Heritage Conservation and Management at the Faculty of Archaeology and Anthropology Yarmouk University, Jordan defines preventive conservation as "the mitigation of deterioration and damage to cultural property through the formulation and implementation of policies and procedures for the following: appropriate environmental conditions; handling and maintenance procedures for storage, exhibition, packing, transport, and use; integrated pest management; emergency preparedness and response; and reformatting/duplication. Preventive conservation is an ongoing process that continues throughout the life of cultural property, and does not end with interventive treatment." The practice of preventive conservation intends to provide the greatest amount of conservation for the largest number of objects in a collection. Jeffrey Levin, Communications Editor, Information and Communications, at the Getty Conservation Institute states that: "In the long term, it [preventive conservation], is the most efficient form of conservation, not only for museums, but particularly for libraries and collections of ethnographic, natural history, and geologic materials. With comprehensive preventive conservation, the need for individual treatments can, over time, be reduced to more manageable levels, putting personnel and financial resources to more effective use." Preventive conservation allows institutions with collections to better manage their available resources when it comes to caring for their collections.

== Restoration ==
Restoration is restoring an antique or work of art, or any cultural artefact, to a like-new condition, or preserving an antique or work of art against further deterioration as in conservation.

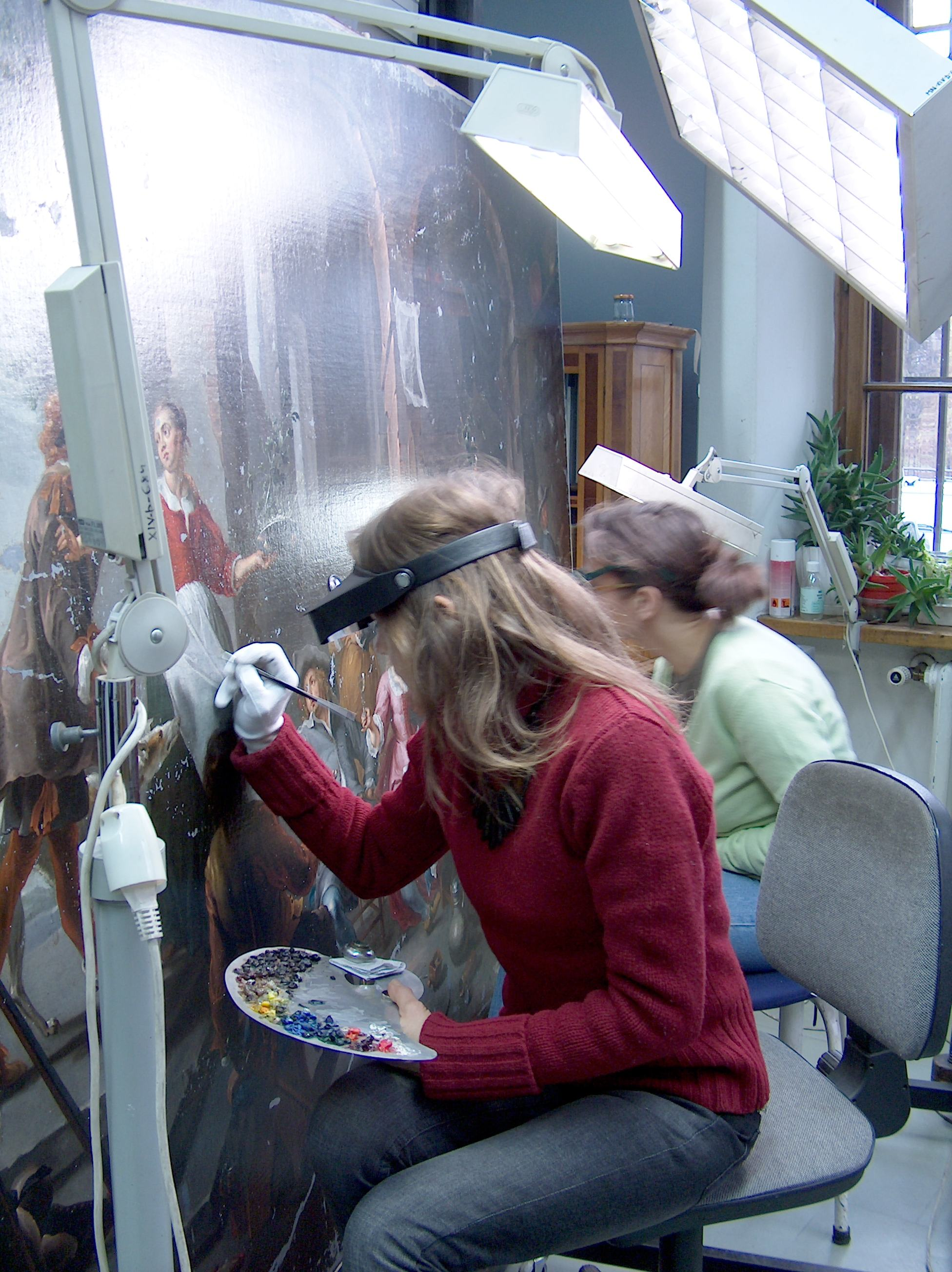
Antiques restoration, National Museum, Warsaw

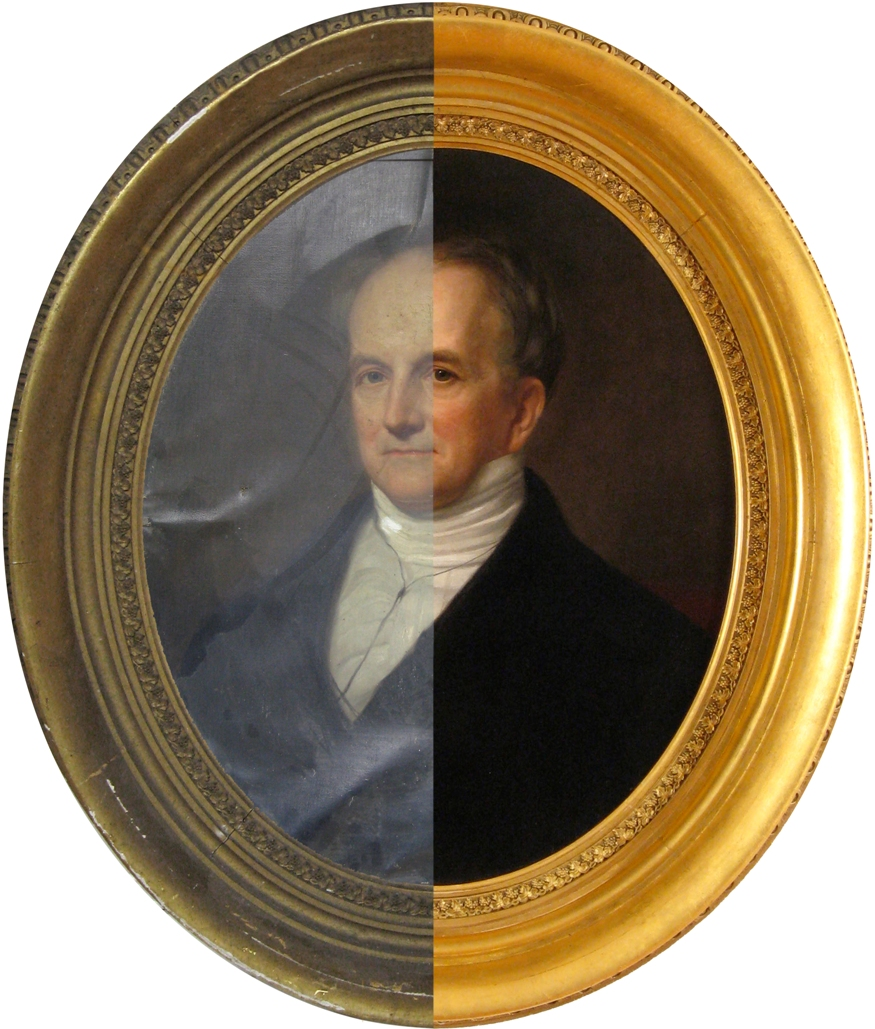
Antique painting and frame restoration: before and after photo

Restoration can be as simple as light cleaning to remove disfiguring dirt or grime, such as on the surface of a painting, or it may include near complete rebuilding or replacement, as might be the case with old automobiles or furniture. Often done in preparation for sale, or by a collector upon acquiring a new piece, the main goal of restoration is to "restore" the original appearance or functionality of a piece.

There considerable difference between restoring and repairing. Functionality may be achieved by a repair, but restoring an item properly is an art-form. Finishes might/may be stripped and redone, but it is essential that the original patination is retained, if possible. Stripping is only done as a last resort, especially with antique furniture. Engines might be rebuilt with new parts as necessary, or holes in a silver pot might/may be patched. While some of these practices are frowned on by many museums, scholars, and other experts, for many people there is little value in an antique that is unusable or not able to be displayed. Poor restoration is the bane of a trained restorer. Working on someone else's bad repair is the worst possible situation. Often with antique restoration, there are also other issues as well. For example, some collectors value "patina", or also want an item to still reflect an aesthetic that shows its age- in this respect, an "over restored" item can actually take away from its value than if nothing has been done to the item at all. Therefore, restoration of valuable objects should always be left to professionals who are sensitive to all of the issues, ensuring that a piece retains or increases its value after restoration.

Original artwork can sustain all sorts of damage over its lifetime. Conservators have an obligation to the artwork to recommend the best techniques for preserving it for future generations.

Restorers are often trained craftspersons, such as furniture makers, mechanics, or metalsmiths. Some have years of experience in their fields, whereas others are self-taught volunteers. Many of the antique aircraft around the United States are restored by trained aircraft engineers assisted by volunteers, some of whom are men who flew those same aircraft years ago.

Given that a single piece of furniture may include wood, glass, inlay, leather and fabric, antique restoration encompasses several skills. Caldararo estimates that 90 percent of USA restorers are self-taught, or have cobbled their skills together from idiosyncratic backgrounds.

"French Polishing" was the industry standard in Europe during the 18th and 19th centuries, pushed aside by the efficient advantage of modern methods in the Industrial Revolution. Lacquers and spray systems replaced the original French polish finish, which is impractical for mass furniture production due to the labor-intensive process of application. As the desire for antiques was not idle, neither was the need for them to be appropriately restored; thus, the trade has been kept alive by a thread.

=== Terminology ===
- Conservation: Detail-oriented process designed to preserve as much original finish and materials as possible while bringing the piece back to as close to its original condition as possible.
- Finish restoration: Finish restoration is the process of bringing an existing finish back to life. This involves re-emulsifying the original finish, either shellac or varnish. By using the original solvents to liquefy the solids, their ability to adhere to and penetrate the piece returns. The process also removes the dirt and grime accumulated over years of use. If the finish is very thin, additional layers of the same finish may be applied to bolster the restored finish and ensure longevity. Finish restoration results in an original finish rating: for example, 85% of the original finish remains. The more original finish that remains, the more antique value remains.
- Preservation: The process of stopping or slowing deterioration usually does not involve actual restoration or attempts to return the piece to its original condition. Damage and finish deterioration are left intact, but prevented from going further. This process is usually done on museum works; we recommend a conservation or restoration process for home use of antiques. In most cases this is a chemical process that prevents further oxidation of the wood and metals, and in addition adds moisture to the existing finish.
- Refinishing: Removing a finish and applying a new finish in its place. This process destroys significant portions of antique value in furniture and should be avoided unless absolutely necessary.
- Repair: Physical structural replacement or reinforcement of parts of the original piece. May involve addition of new materials altered to appear aged or the application of antique materials to improve appearance of repair and preserve as much value as possible.
- Restoration: Bringing a piece back to close to its original condition including structural and finish repairs.
- Stripping: stripping involves dipping the piece in a chemical bath that will remove finish, patina, and in some cases the glue holding the piece together.

=== Salvage ===
On the other extreme, though most bad old pieces were thrown away long ago, there are pieces that, because of their original design or workmanship or because of damage, are not worth restoring but that are made of re-usable materials such as hard wood, amber, pewter or ivory. As the number of people increases and the number of trees and other natural products in the world decreases, wood and other materials become more scarce. So the fact that the material was not worth doing a good job with when an item was made does not mean that the material should be discarded along with the object now.

== Ethics ==
Museums, libraries, archives and private entities have the duty and responsibility to take care of and preserve their collections for the future. In order carry out this duty, these organizations strive to maintain the highest standards of professionalism and ethical practice when caring for their collections. In order to direct and guide their actions organizations follow ethical codes of conduct such as the one created by the American Institute for Conservation (AIC).

Such codes of ethics are intended to provide guidance and are not intended to be taken as absolute practice as institutions are varied in their size, scope, and nature. It is up to each institution to adapt, adopt, and implement ethical guidelines which are necessary to meet that institution's conservation requirements for objects in their collection.

Some institutions, such as the Victoria and Albert Museum (V&A), have developed and implemented their own form of ethical protocols, procedures, and guidelines in order to ensure that the V&A takes into account all points of views before any object undergoes conservation intervention or treatment. The V&A's ethics protocol was implemented through the use of a novel checklist method, "Victoria & Albert Museum Conservation Department Ethics Checklist" introduced in 1994.

A brief extract of the checklist demonstrates its question-driven approach, in place of a more directive approach:

V&A Conservation Department Ethics Checklist (Second Edition; December 2004)
1. Why is action needed?
2. Have I consulted records?
3. Have I consulted stakeholders, peers, other specialists?
4. Have I considered and weighted the factors contributing to the identity and significance of the object(s)?
5. What are my options for action which will produce an appropriate result with minimum intervention?

Regardless of the ethics protocol followed, ethics plays an important role in object conservation.

== See also ==
- Automotive restoration, returning a vehicle to a like-new state, or to an idealization or fantasy of its as-new state, such as for display at a Concours d'Elegance or for competition in a classic car race
  - Restored trains
- Conservation and restoration of cultural property
  - Conservation and restoration of immovable cultural property, work performed on a building in an attempt to return it to a previous state
- Cosmetic restoration (or refinishing), restoration work on any item which focuses upon its appearance rather than its functionality or structure
- Fabric restoration, restoration of clothing and other textiles
- Renovation and refurbishment of vehicles, furniture, appliances, equipment, etc.
- Ship of Theseus
- Watchmaker, one who fixes or restores mechanical watches

== See also ==
- Franklin Furnace Archive (conservation of contemporary art including artists books)
