= FHR Fred Robertson Los Angeles Pottery =

Small studio art pottery manufacturer

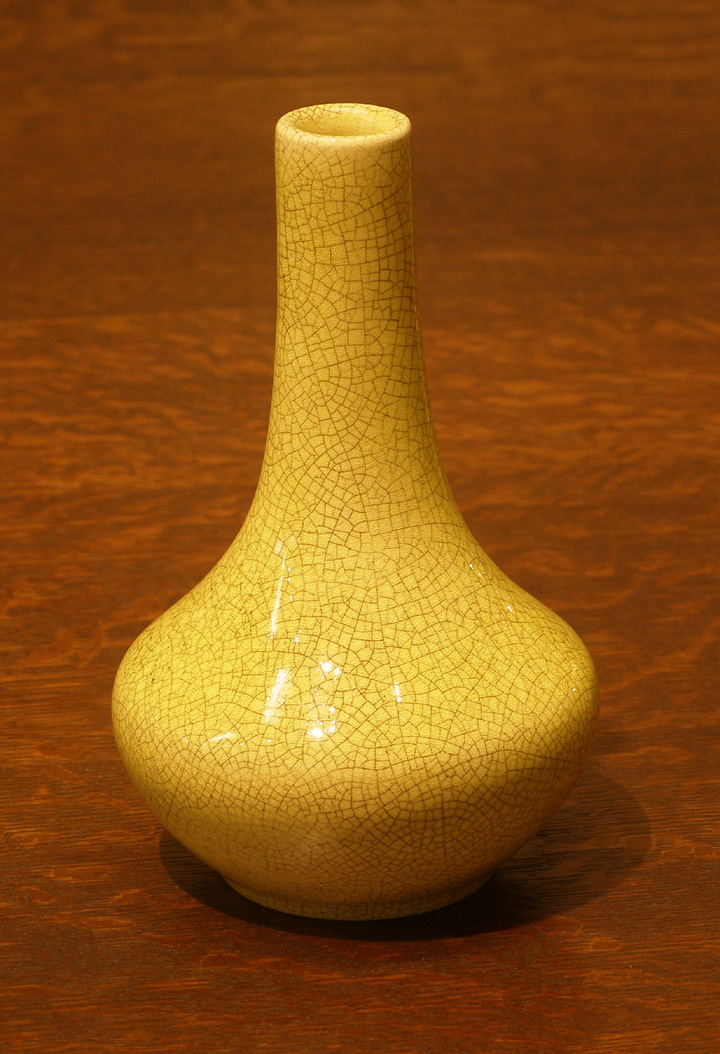
Crackle glaze vase

FHR Fred Robertson Los Angeles Pottery was a small studio art pottery manufacturer in Los Angeles, California, from approximately 1906 to approximately 1921.

== Background ==
Fred H. Robertson and his father, Alexander, were important figures in the art pottery movement in America. Alexander, a fifth generation potter, had founded Chelsea Keramic Art Works (Chelsea, Massachusetts) in 1866 (or 1867), its successor, Dedham Pottery (Dedham, Massachusetts) in 1896, and the Roblin Art Pottery (San Francisco) in 1898. Fred worked at Chelsea and then Dedham. Other Robertson family members worked at Chelsea and Dedham, including Alexander's brother, Hugh. Dedham is known for its crackle (craquelure), volcanic glazes, and blue cobalt hand painted designs.

In 1903, Fred moved to California and joined Alexander at Roblin. The name Roblin came from the names of its founders, Robertson and Linna Irelan. Fred moved to Los Angeles in 1906 and worked for LA Pressed Brick until 1921 as its superintendent. At LA Pressed Brick Fred won medals for his crystalline and lustered glazes.

== Formation of the studio ==
From approximately 1906 until approximately 1921, Fred also operated a small art pottery studio in Los Angeles known as "FHR Fred Robertson Los Angeles." FHR is best known for its crackle, matte, crystalline and luster glazes. The crackle finish was a well known Robertson development from the Chelsea/Dedham period, inspired by the Oriental pottery seen by Hugh Robertson at the Centennial Exposition. The pottery is typically marked on the bottom with a stamped or incised "FHR" or "FHR Los Angeles."

In 1921, Fred, along with Gus Larson of LA Pressed Brick, moved to Claycraft Potteries Company (Los Angeles), which was established that year. Claycraft is known to have been located at 3101 San Fernando Road. Fred was the general superintendent of Claycraft, focusing on the development of bodies and glazes. George B. Robertson, Fred's son, joined the firm as a designer in 1925. Claycraft is well known for its decorative tiles, garden pottery, fountains and lamp bases. The body of work achieved at Claycraft is largely credited to the skill and attention of the two Robertsons. In 1934, the two departed to form Robertson/Hollywood Pottery. The last mention of Claycraft Potteries is found in Los Angeles city directories of 1939.

Robertson/Hollywood Pottery was located in Los Angeles California at a time when many of the better potters were moving west. Robertson/Hollywood made household pottery items such as plates and covered boxes. Robertson/Hollywood pottery is typically marked on the bottom with incised script "Robertson/Hollywood."

Robertson/Hollywood Pottery closed in 1952.
