= Sytin's house in Sytinsky lane =

- Дом Сытина в Сытинском переулке
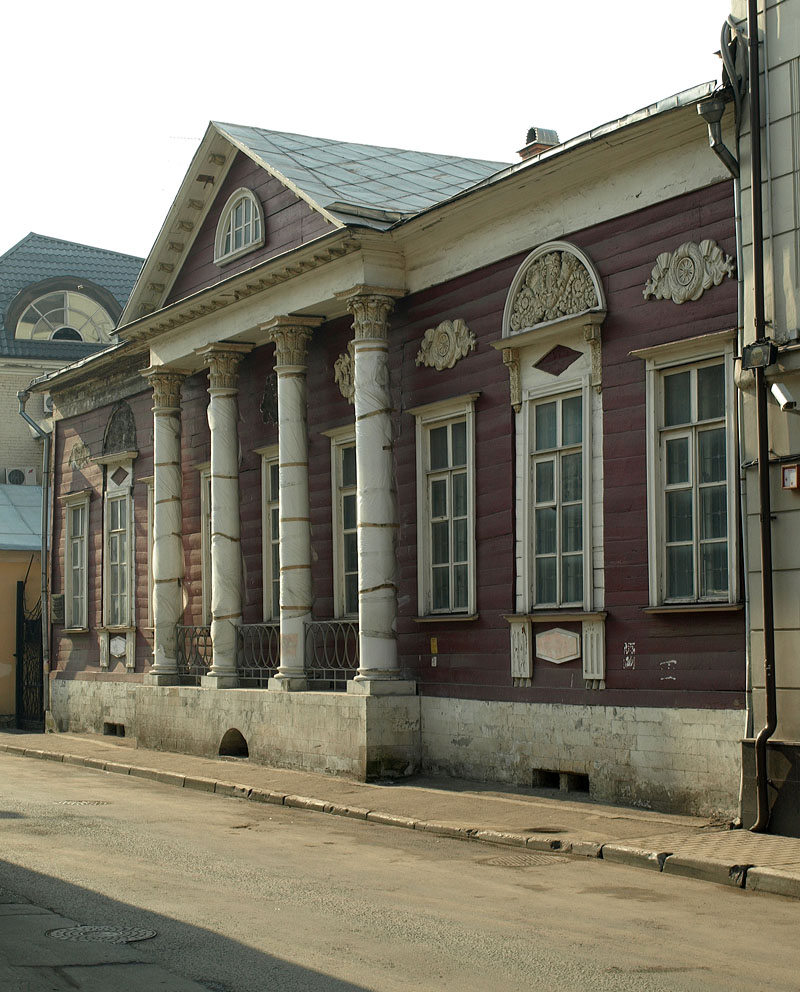
- Interactive map of Sytin's house in Sytinsky lane
- Location: Moscow, Sytinsky lane, house 5, building 5

Sytin's house in Sytinsky lane (Russian: Дом Сытина в Сытинском переулке) is a wooden building in the center of Moscow (Sytinsky lane, house 5, building 5). A unique example of the construction of the city before the fire of 1812, it is the main house of the city manor of the noble family Sytinykh. The house was built in 1804 in the classicism style. It has the status of an object of cultural heritage of federal significance.

== History ==
The wooden manor house was built on the site owned by the brigadier Andrei Sytin. In April 1804, the Moscow office of buildings gave permission for its construction, and it was erected at the end of the summer construction season. Satyn's house was not damaged during the Moscow fire of 1812. On both sides of it stood two small outbuildings, but only the left one has survived strong reconstructions. On the site of the right wing, an apartment house was built in 1903 by architect A. N. Sokolov.

By the beginning of the 21st century, the house had been empty for several years, which had a poor effect on its condition. There are plans to carry out restoration works.

== Architecture and design ==
A one-story wooden frame was built on a more ancient stone foundation of the 17th century, which has been lined with boards outside. The central part of the main facade is marked with a small portico with four thin Corinthian columns. The portico ends with a pediment with a semicircular window. High eight-glass windows of the main facade are framed with platbands and crowned with molded patterns in Empire style (featuring lunettes and medallions) that appeared after the Patriotic War of 1812. The house of Sytin contains a suite of high ceremonial premises on the street side and a mezzanine above the low back rooms. The preserved furnace is lined with white ceramic tiles with craquelures. Molded caryatids have been added on the western wall of the staircase in the second half of the 19th century.
