= Hung =

Hung may refer to:

== People ==
- Hung (surname), various Chinese surnames
- Hùng king, a king of Vietnam
- Hung (Vietnamese given name)

People with the given name Hung include:

- Hung Huynh (born 1978), Vietnamese-American chef, winner of the third season of the television show Top Chef
- Hung Pham (born 1963), Vietnamese-Canadian politician
- Hung Cheng (born 1937), professor of applied mathematics
- Hung Cao (born 1971), American government official and retired military officer

== Entertainment ==
- Hung, a 1970 novel by Dean Koontz (published under the name Leonard Chris)

=== Film and television ===
- Hung, a short film by Guinevere Turner
- Hung (TV series), aired on HBO

=== Songs ===
- "Hung", by Napalm Death
- "Hung", by Wire from the album Mind Hive

== Other ==
- Hung language, a Viet-Muong language spoken in Laos
- Hang (instrument), a musical instrument whose name is pronounced "hung"
- Old Hungarian alphabet (ISO 15924 script code: Hung)
- A term for possessing a large human penis size

== See also ==
- Hang (disambiguation)
