= Refinishing =

Repairing or reapplying wood finishing on an object

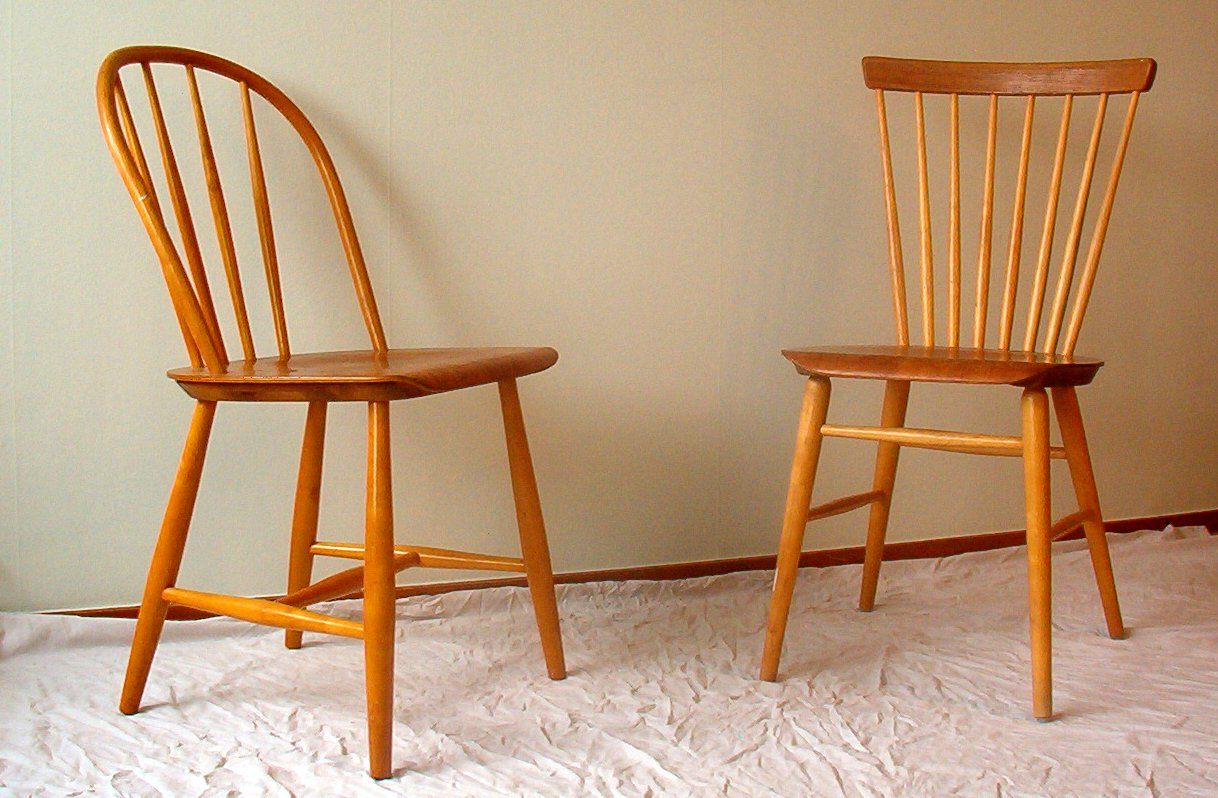
These Swedish Windor chairs are an example of traditionally finished woodwork.

In woodworking and the decorative arts, refinishing (also repolishing in the UK)refers to the act of repairing or reapplying the wood finishing on an object. paint, wood finish top coat, wax, lacquer or varnish are commonly used.

The artisan or restorer is traditionally aiming for an improved or restored and renewed finish. However, there are a great variety of both traditional and modern finishes, including faux finishes, and distressing or antiquing to make pieces look older. While refinishing is often undertaken to improve an old piece of furniture, in the case of antique furniture refinishing can significantly reduce its overall value.

== Other types of refinishing ==
Refinishing can also be carried out on other surfaces and materials such, glass, metal, plastic and paint.

== See also ==
- Patina
- Glaze (painting technique)
- Metal leaf
- Faux painting
