= Nitromors =

Nitromors (formally "Nitromors Master Craftsman's Paint And Varnish Remover") is a paint-stripping chemical intended for do-it-yourself use. It is manufactured in the U.K. by Henkel Consumer Adhesives of Winsford, Cheshire.

The original product, up to circa 2006, came in two versions - "All Purpose" and "Master Craftsman". The active and main ingredient of both the original Nitromors versions was dichloromethane (also known as methylene chloride) accompanied by a smaller proportion of methanol. This product was recommended by the Guild of Master Craftsmen and the Guild's logo appeared on the tin.

The pre-2006 version was certified for safety, as is the post-2006 version.

The current All Purpose version of the product, as of 2011, does not contain any of the active ingredient dichloromethane, and the logo representing approval by the Guild of Master Craftsmen no longer appears on the tin.

The instructions for use of all the versions of the product indicate that great care should be taken to work in a well-ventilated area, preferably outdoors, because there are health risks from the fumes.
