= Hanging craft =

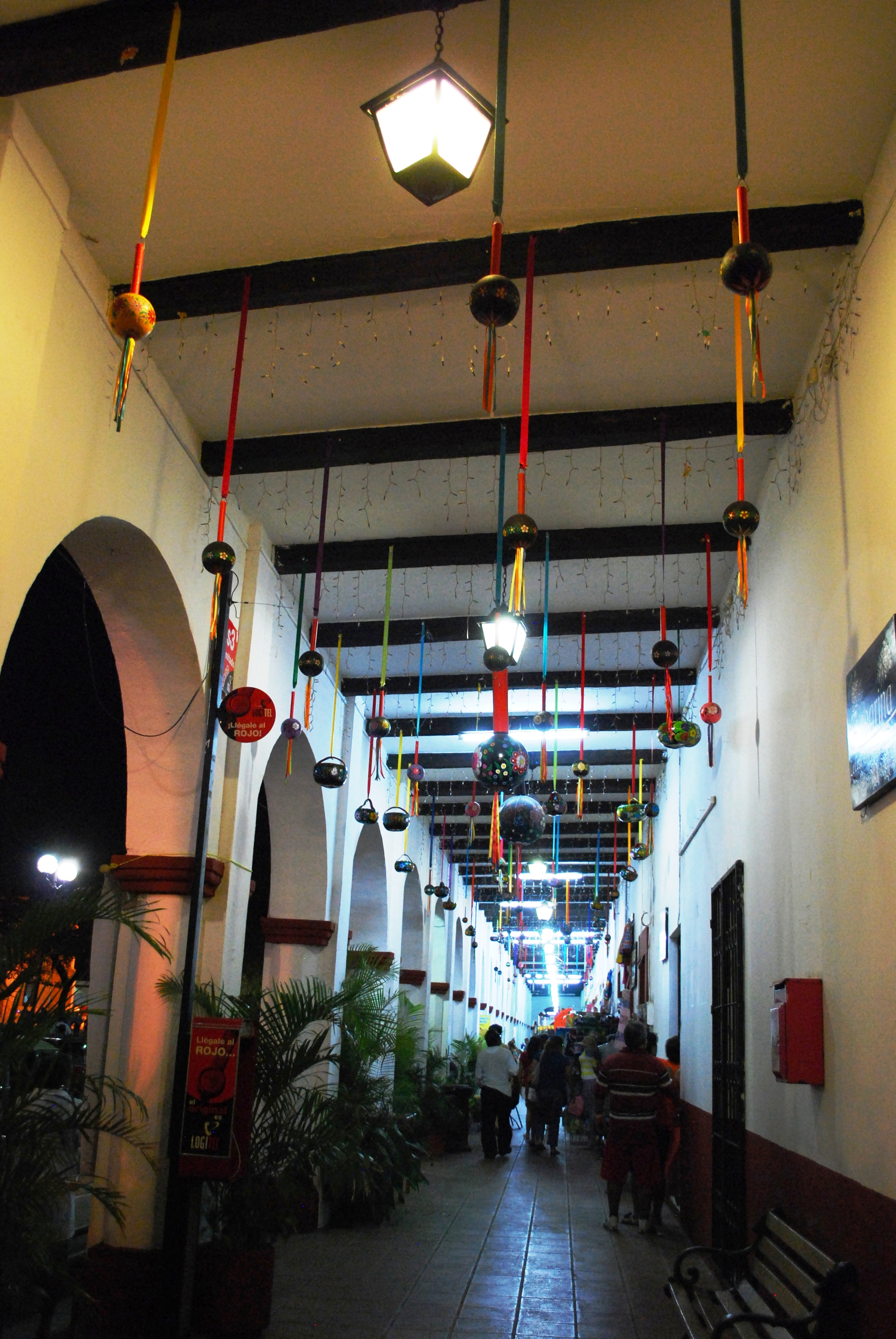
Decorative hangings

A wall hanging craft is a decoration, an amulet, a religious or a symbolic object that is hung from the ceiling or another structure. The sculptor Alexander Calder invented the mobiles, popular in the nursery, to give infants something to entertain them and give them external visual stimulation. Kakemono, a Japanese hanging, is intended to be hung against a wall as part of the interior decoration of a room.

== Overview ==
Hanging crafts are also called by the names like Wall décor, Wall art, Wall Crafts, etc. Hanging crafts can project abstract shapes fashioned from sheet metal, wood, paper or plastic materials, connected by wire or cord, whose individual elements are capable of moving independently or as a whole when prompted by air movement or direct contact. Heavy hangings are hung with a lag bolt with deep grooves in the threads for maximum grip, or with a toggle bolt that uses a large collapsible nut to increase clamping pressure of the bolt.

A hanging craft trend that used to be in fashion in the 1960s and 1970s to provide a bohemian style to interiors is back on trend. People use these wall hangings for decorative purposes or for functionality, like key holders, wall mirrors, or lighting.

== See also ==
- Florentine crafts
