= Dedham Pottery =

Pottery company

- Industry: Pottery
- Founded: 1896
- Founder: Hugh Robertson
- Defunct: 1943
- Headquarters: Dedham, MA, United States of America
- Key people: Hugh C. Robertson

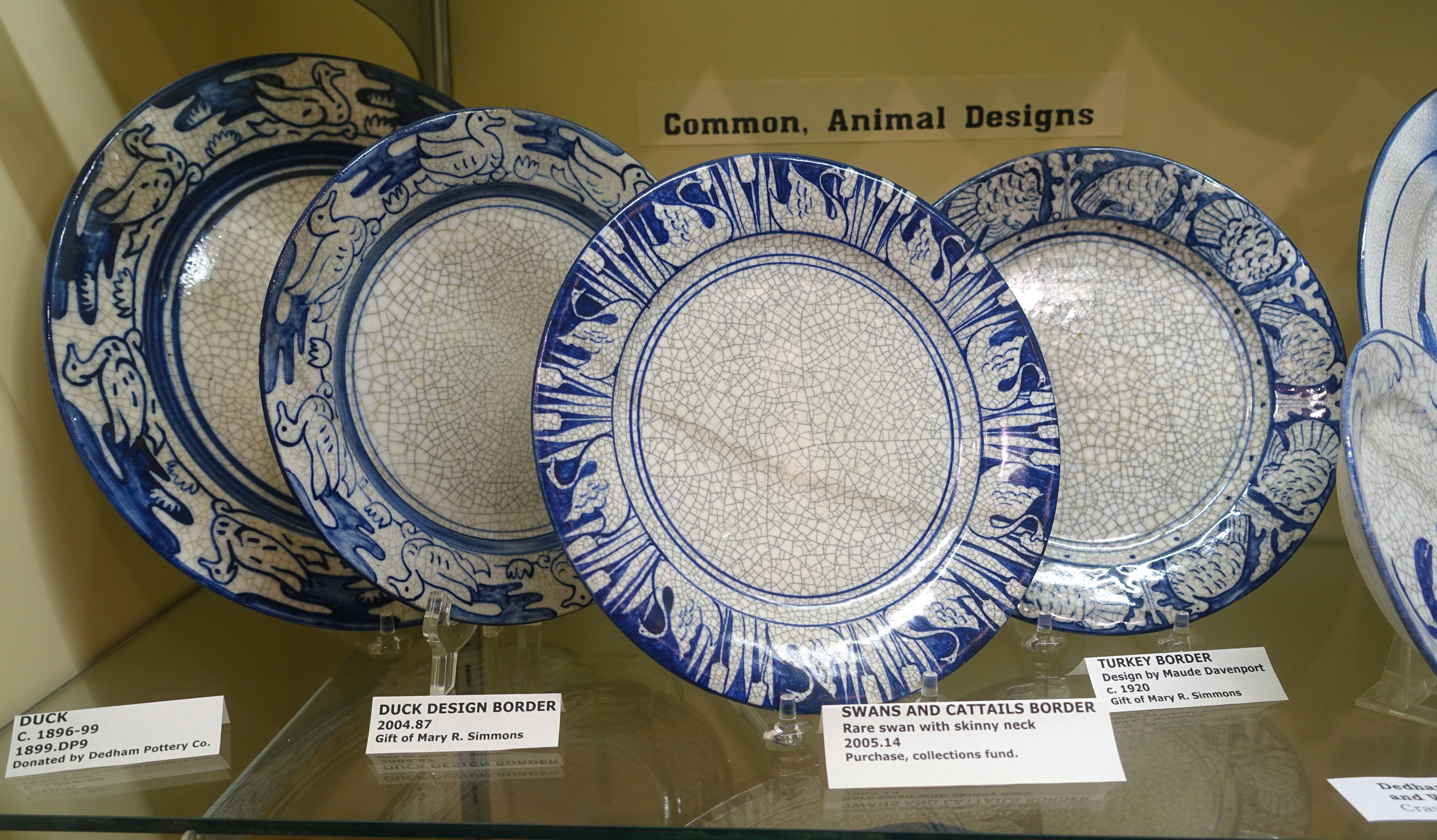
Plates with crackling and bird designs, 1896-c. 1920

Dedham Pottery was an American art pottery company opened by the Robertson Family in Dedham, Massachusetts during the American arts & crafts movement that operated between 1896 and 1943. It was known for its high-fire stoneware characterized by a controlled and very fine crackle glaze with thick cobalt border designs. The Chelsea Keramic Art Works (1872–1889) and "Chelsea Pottery U.S." (to 1895) were earlier companies of the family.

== History ==
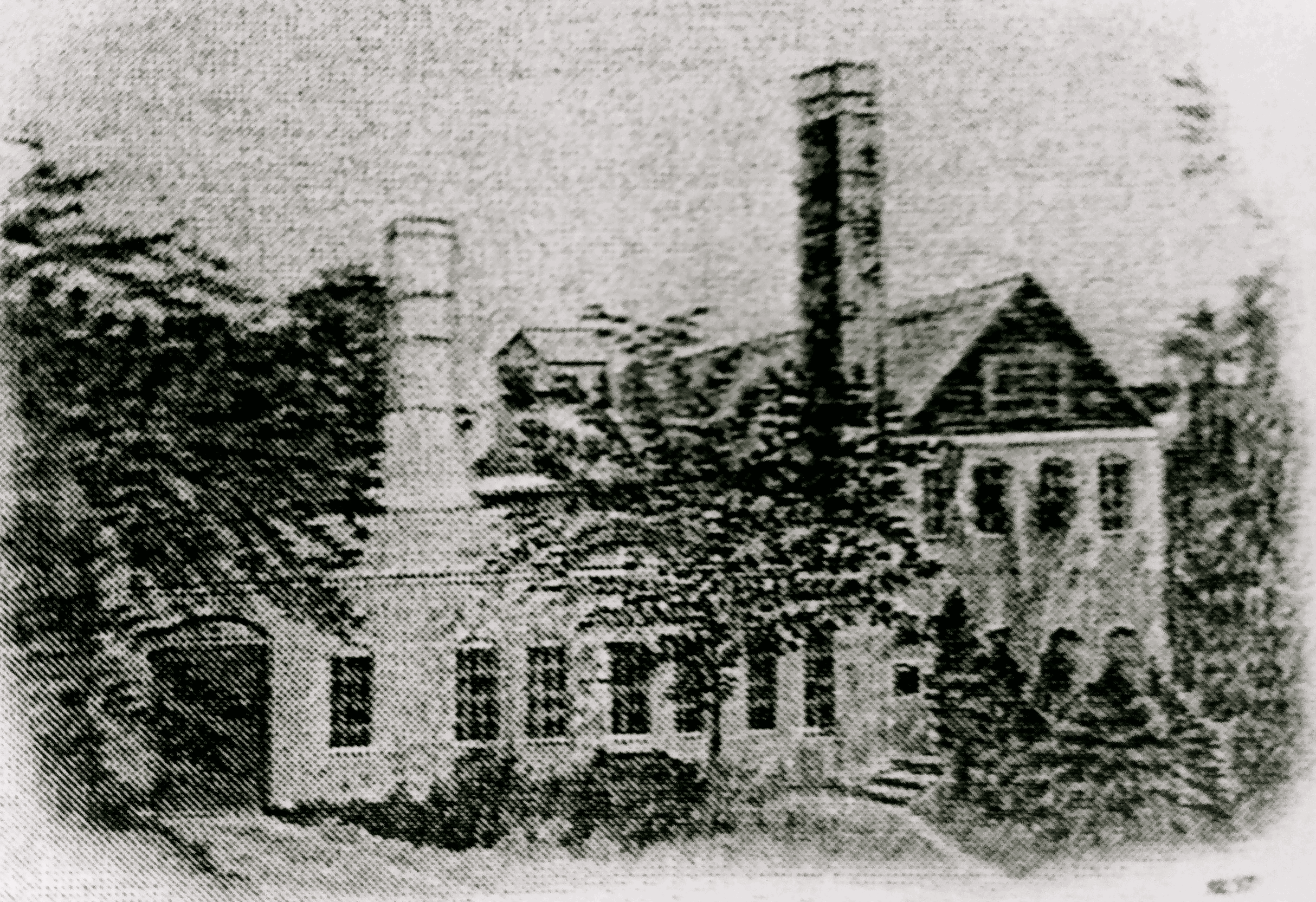
Dedham Pottery Factory

In 1867, James Robertson, a Scottish immigrant, founded the family's first company in Chelsea, Massachusetts on the corner of Marginal and Willow Streets. It subsequently became the Chelsea Keramic Art Works (CKAW) from 1872 to 1889, and then Chelsea Pottery U.S. (CPUS). In 1876, family member Hugh C. Robertson visited the Centennial Exposition in Philadelphia - an early world’s fair - and viewed pottery from China with a blood-red crackled glaze that would inspire him to create his own version. He would go on to develop the distinctive crackle ware glaze that makes Dedham Pottery distinctive. Over 50 designs would be created, but the bunny version was the most popular and became iconic.

The Boston Daily Globe reported on Monday, July, 30th 1894, that "about 10 acres of land at East Dedham, was sold for $6,500 to the Chelsea Pottery Company" and the pottery company would be moving from Chelsea to Dedham, "just as soon as proper buildings can be erected and other necessary work done." Chelsea Pottery U.S. closed in 1895 and, just as promised, the company moved on to Dedham, Massachusetts where Hugh C. Robertson opened Dedham Pottery in 1896.

The architect of the building, who also served on the company's board, was Alexander Wadsworth Longfellow Jr. The plant, which rarely if ever employed more than six people at a time, was located on Pottery Lane, off High Street, where the 2012 Avery School stands. Dedham Pottery became popular with the upper classes in the Boston area and around the country.

Maude Davenport, who was raised on Greenlodge Street in Dedham, is regarded as the company's most skilled decorator. The company closed in 1942 when J. Milton Robterson, Hugh's grandson, accepted a commission into the U.S. Navy and liquidated all the companies remaining pieces through a half price sale at Gimbel's in New York City. Reproductions made by the Potting Shed, Inc. began being produced in 1977.

The building burned to the ground in the 1970s.

== Patterns ==
The most common and recognizable design is a repeating crouching rabbit referred to as "the Dedham rabbit". The rabbits crouch on the ground with their ears back and in between each rabbit stands a vegetable stalk which a former workman has claimed to be a Brussels sprout. There are generally 10 rabbits in total and are spaced out evenly in a clockwise rotation. The Dedham rabbit design had been drawn by Miss Alice Morse and J. Lindon Smith of the Museum of Fine Arts School in Boston. Other designs featured elephants, dolphins, polar bears, chicks, swans, turtles, ducks, butterflies, lilies, clover, and mushrooms. During its span of production, Dedham Pottery created over fifty patterns for dinnerware and serving pieces.

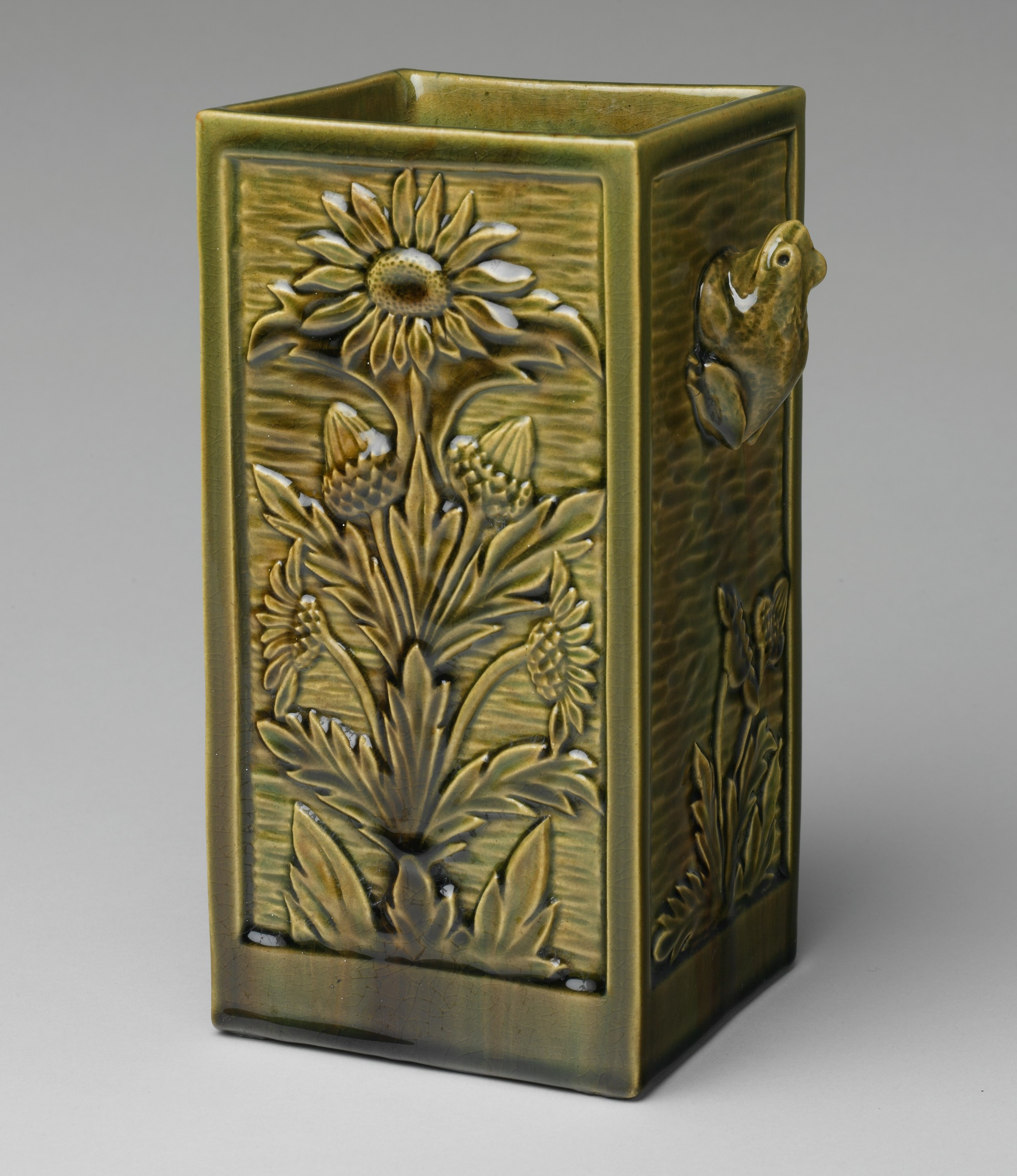
CKAW vase with flowers & frog, 1876–80

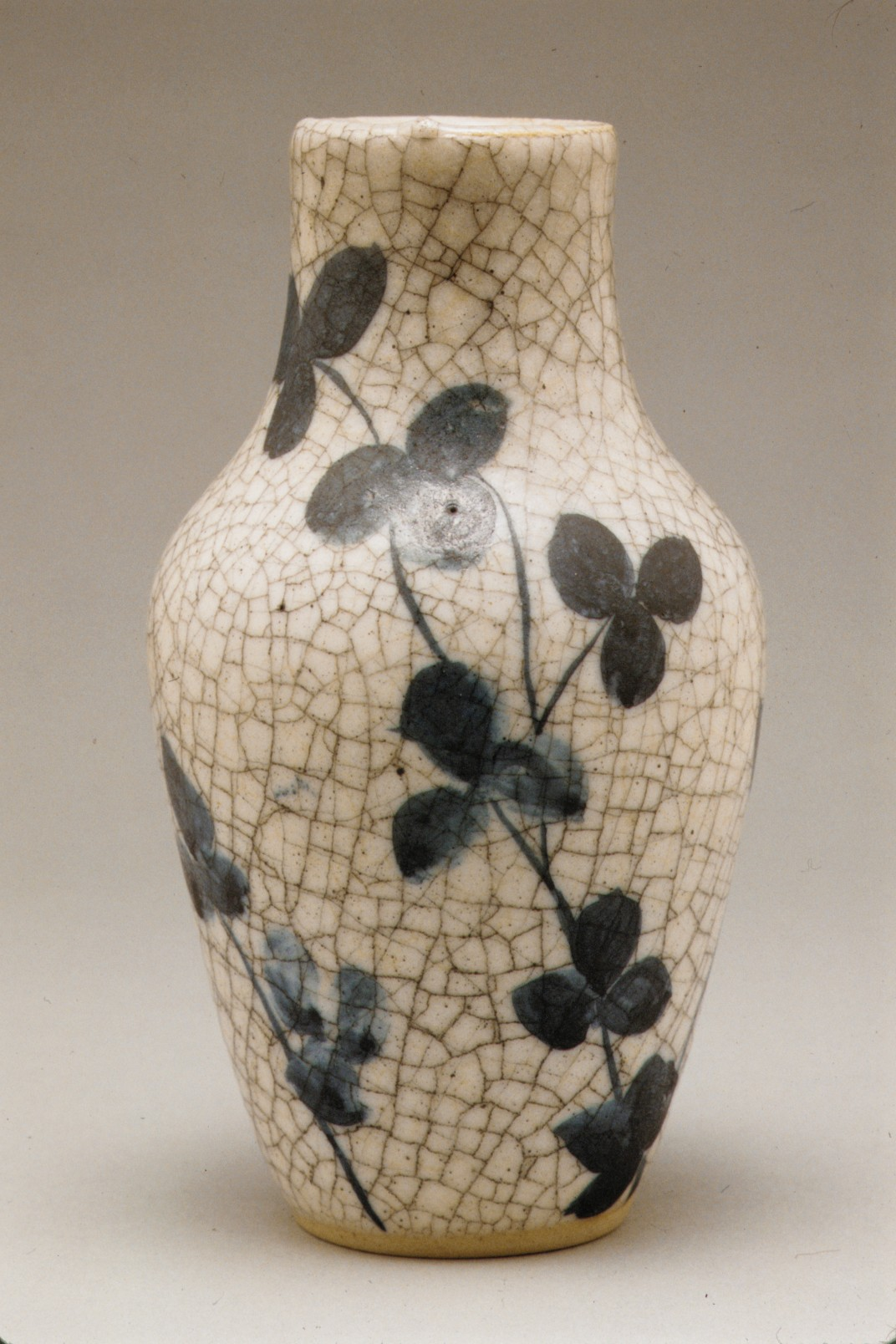
CKAW vase, c. 1886-89, with crackling

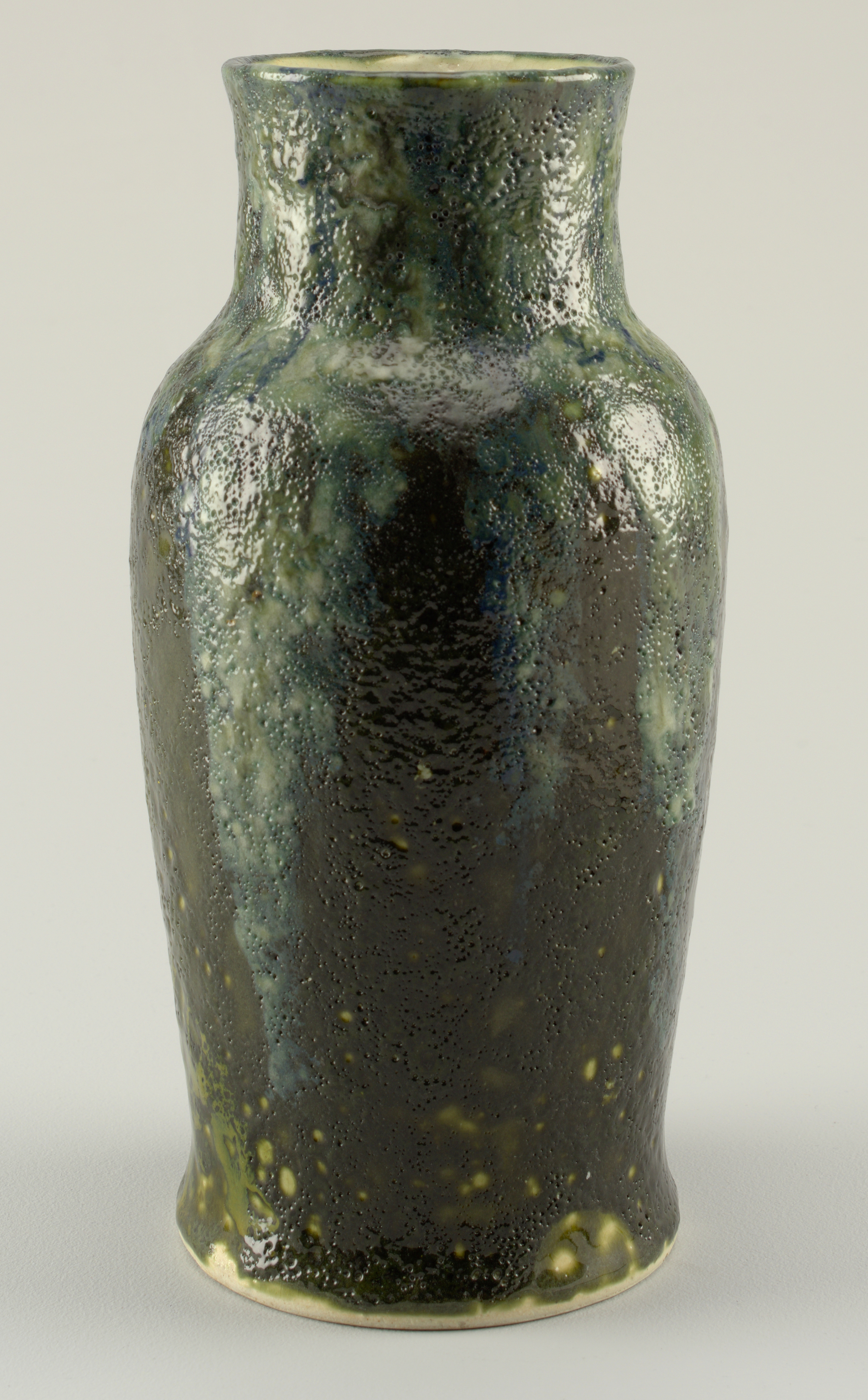
DP vase, c. 1896–1908, gray-white thrown stoneware body, olive green volcanic glaze pitted with yellow-green "craters." A blue-gray and green glaze flowing over the base glaze extending from rim to shoulder, also pitted

== Markings ==
- 1872–1889: CKAW (Chelsea Keramic Art Works)
- 1892-1895: C.P.U.S. (Chelsea Pottery U.S.) impressed inside a clover leaf.
- 1896-1928: Square blue stamp with DEDHAM POTTERY printed over a rabbit; impressed foreshortened rabbit beneath.
- 1929-1943: REGISTERED added under standard Dedham Pottery stamp; two impressed foreshortened rabbits beneath.

Rarely the decorator would add his initials, a date, or the initials of the purchaser but these instances were rare and therefore, for collecting purposes, valuable.

Maude Rose Davenport a very skilled decorator at Dedham Pottery between 1904 and 1928 signed her work with a rebus, a small 5mm circle in the border of her designs. Hugh C. Robertson sometimes signed his decorations with a square.

== Reproductions ==
The Dedham Historical Society as well as another company in Concord, MA produces reproductions of Dedham pottery. The Dedham Historical Society owns both the name and original trademark of Dedham Pottery. However, when making reproductions, the pottery is clearly labeled as such. The Potting Shed in Concord, Massachusetts made reproductions of Dedham Pottery from 1977 to 2014. The pieces were hand made and had the last two numbers of the date in which they were made on the back.

== Works cited ==
- Dedham Historical Society (2001). Images of America:Dedham. Arcadia Publishing. ISBN 978-0-7385-0944-0.
- Parr, James L. (2009). Dedham: Historic and Heroic Tales From Shiretown. The History Press. ISBN 978-1-59629-750-0.
