= Aging (artwork) =

Process to appear older

Aging is a process by which an artwork, typically a painting or sculpture, is made to appear old. It is meant to emulate the natural deterioration that can occur over many decades or centuries. Although there may be "innocent" reasons for it, ageing is a technique very often used in art forgery.

Paintings deteriorate over time because they are created using essentially incompatible materials, with each having a different reaction to the changes in the environment, including light, temperature and relative humidity.

An oil painting consists of several layers, comprising the base canvas, a layer of gesso base coat, several layers of the oil-based paint and then several coats of varnish to protect the paint surface. With many different materials, it is understandable that each layer may dry at different rates and will also absorb and release moisture at different rates. When this occurs, expansion and contraction of the painting will result in a crazing of the varnish surface. This pattern of small cracks is known as craquelure. Along with the darkening or yellowing of the varnish surface, it is this visual representation of the cracking that is typically the primary indicator of ageing.

The purpose for artificially ageing is to create a finished product that accurately reflects an era or is consistent with the environment (usually period) into which it is to be placed.

== See also ==
- Art conservation and restoration
- Art forgery
- Distressing
