= Strié =

Example of the strie faux painting technique over raised stencil

Strié (French: [stʁije]; French for 'striated, ribbed') is a popular form of faux painting using glaze and paint brushes to create a soft natural striped texture. Strié is a negative glaze technique. The glaze is generally rolled over the entire surface, and then removed with a tool such as a brush. The word strié can be used to describe this process of painting, or to describe the actual finish created.

Strié is a simple technique that can be altered and elaborated in many ways. It can be done on its own, with the streaks directed either vertically or horizontally. It can be brushed over a raised plaster stencil. It is also very popular to overlap a horizontal and vertical strié, creating the look of fabrics such as linen or denim. This is often referred to as a linen weave or burlap strié.

== See also ==
- Faux finishing
- Color wash
