= Hang On =

Hang On may refer to:

== Songs ==
- "Hang On" (Plumb song)
- "Hang On" (Weezer song)
- "Hang On" by Smash Mouth from Get the Picture?
- "Hang On", by Guster from Ganging Up on the Sun
- "Hang On", by Hank III, originally recorded for the unreleased album This Ain't Country, but later released on Ramblin' Man
- "Hang On", by James from Gold Mother
- "Hang On", by Seether from Daredevil: The Album and Disclaimer II
- "Hang On", by Smash Mouth from Get The Picture?
- "Hang On", by Teenage Fanclub from Thirteen
- "Hang On", by X Ambassadors from VHS

== Other uses ==
- Hang-On, a 1985 Sega arcade game
