= Ren Hang =

Ren Hang may refer to:

- Ren Hang (photographer) (1987–2017), Chinese photographer
- Ren Hang (footballer) (born 1989), Chinese association football player
