= Choe Hang =

Ch'oe Hang may refer to:

- Ch'oe Hang (military official)
- Ch'oe Hang (Goryeo civil minister)
- Ch'oe Hang (Joseon civil minister)
