= Craquelure =

Fine pattern of dense cracking on the surface of materials

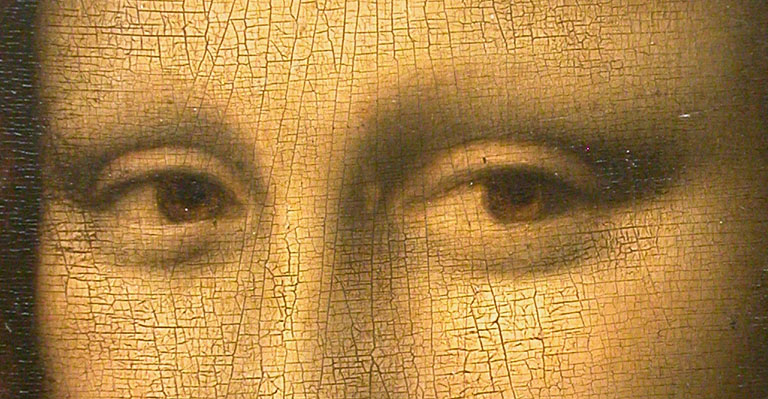
Craquelure in the Mona Lisa, with a typical "Italian" pattern of small rectangular blocks

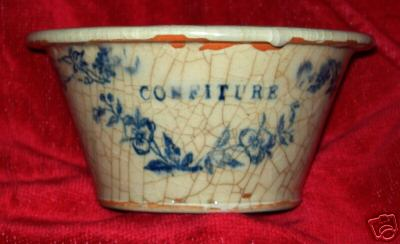
Age craquelure in pottery

Craquelure (French: craquelure; Italian: crettatura) is a fine pattern of dense cracking formed on the surface of materials. It can be a result of drying, shock, aging, intentional patterning, or a combination of all four. The term is most often used to refer to tempera or oil paintings, but it can also develop in old ivory carvings or painted miniatures on an ivory backing. Recently, analysis of craquelure has been proposed as a way to authenticate art.

In ceramics, craquelure in ceramic glazes, where it is often a desired effect, is called "crackle"; it is a characteristic of Chinese Ge ware in particular. This is usually differentiated from crazing, which is a glaze defect in firing, or the result of aging or damage.

== In painted surfaces ==
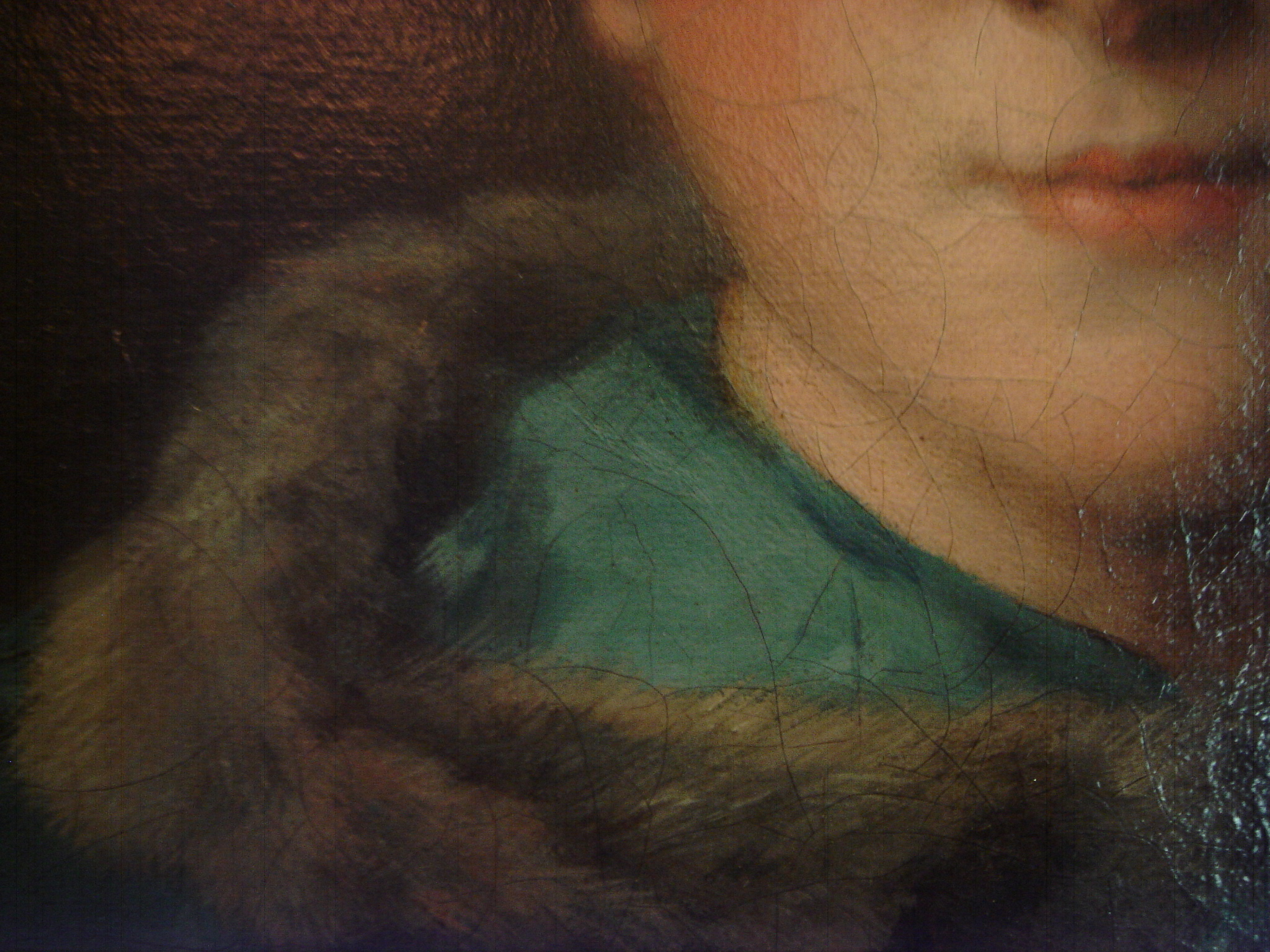
Typical French craquelure in a portrait from c. 1750, larger and less regular patterns, with curving cracks

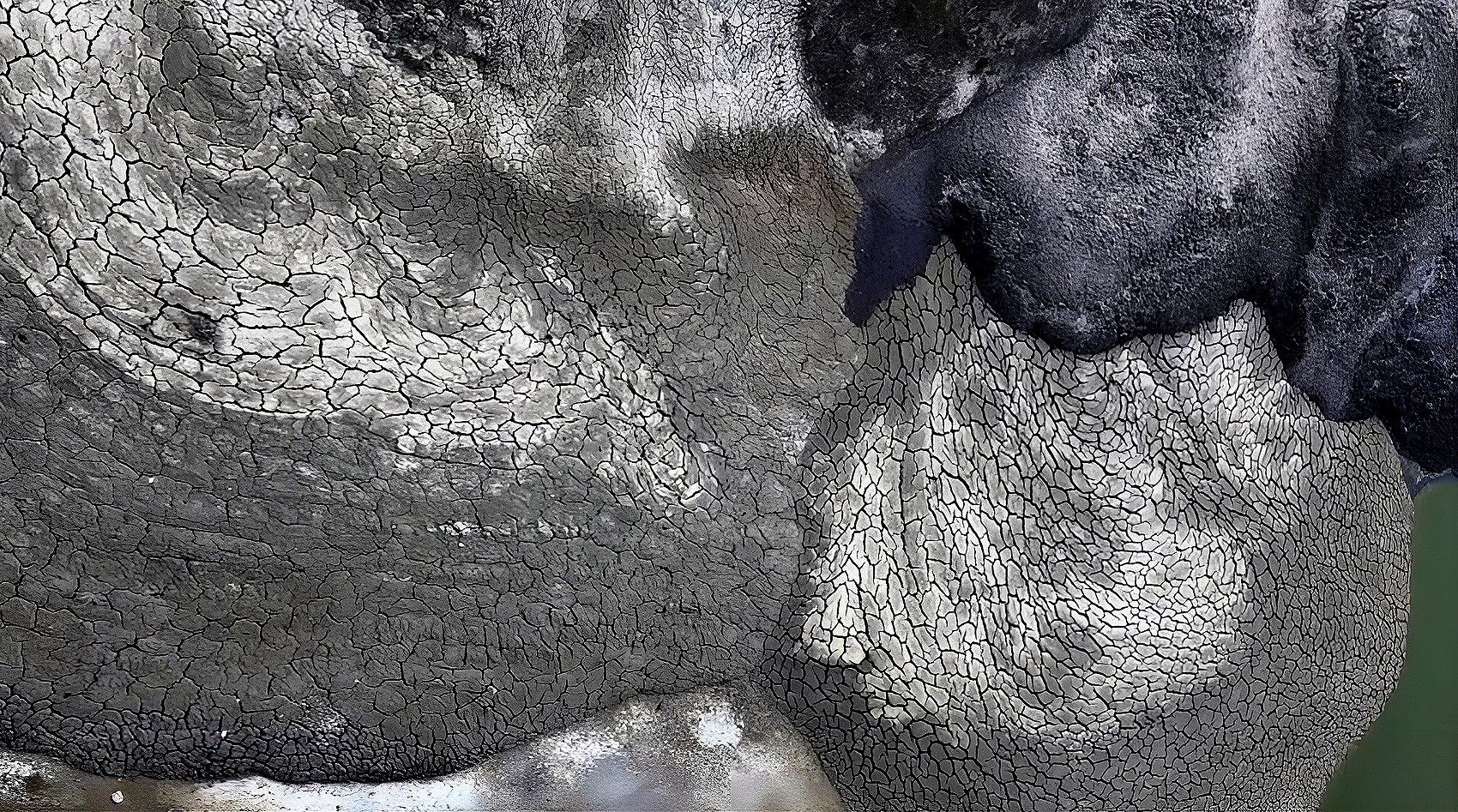
Dried and cracked mud masses.

Painting systems are composed of complex layers with unique mechanical properties that depend on the type of drying oil or paint medium used and the presence of paint additives, such as organic solvents, surfactants, and plasticizers. Understanding the mechanism of craquelure formation in paint and the resulting crack morphology provides information about the methods and materials used by the artists.

=== Characterization of craquelure morphology ===
There are seven key features used to describe craquelure morphology:

1. Local and global direction of cracks
2. Relationship to weave or grain direction of support
3. Crack shape
4. Crack spacing
5. Crack thickness
6. Termination of cracks
7. Organization of crack network

These seven criteria have been used to identify "styles" of craquelure, which relate crack patterns to various historic schools of art. This links the crack patterns with specific time periods, locations, and painting styles.

- Italian paintings on panel (1300–1500): cracks oriented perpendicular to wood grain with jagged lines and distinct secondary networks of thin cracks
- Flemish paintings on panel (1400–1600): cracks oriented parallel to wood grain with smooth, straight segments; uniform thicknesses and small, square islands observed
- Dutch paintings on canvas (1600s): cracks oriented perpendicular to major axis of painting with jagged lines and square junctions; cracks tend to follow weft and warp of canvas support
- French paintings on canvas (1700s): non-directional cracks with smooth, curved lines in random distributions; newly-developed, stiffer sublayers tended to delocalize tension from the support and remove the connection between crack direction and canvas weave

=== Distinguishing Italian and French paintings by craquelures ===
Paintings do not have flat surfaces but rather an uneven texture because of the wood, animal glue, ground or gesso, paint, binder used, etc. Since the elements used to create paintings vary by region, surface textures can also vary according to where they were produced. Italian painters usually used a thin ground surface, which led to their work developing skinny, thin cracks, while French painters have swirling cracks because of a much thicker ground surface.

=== Craquelure during drying ===
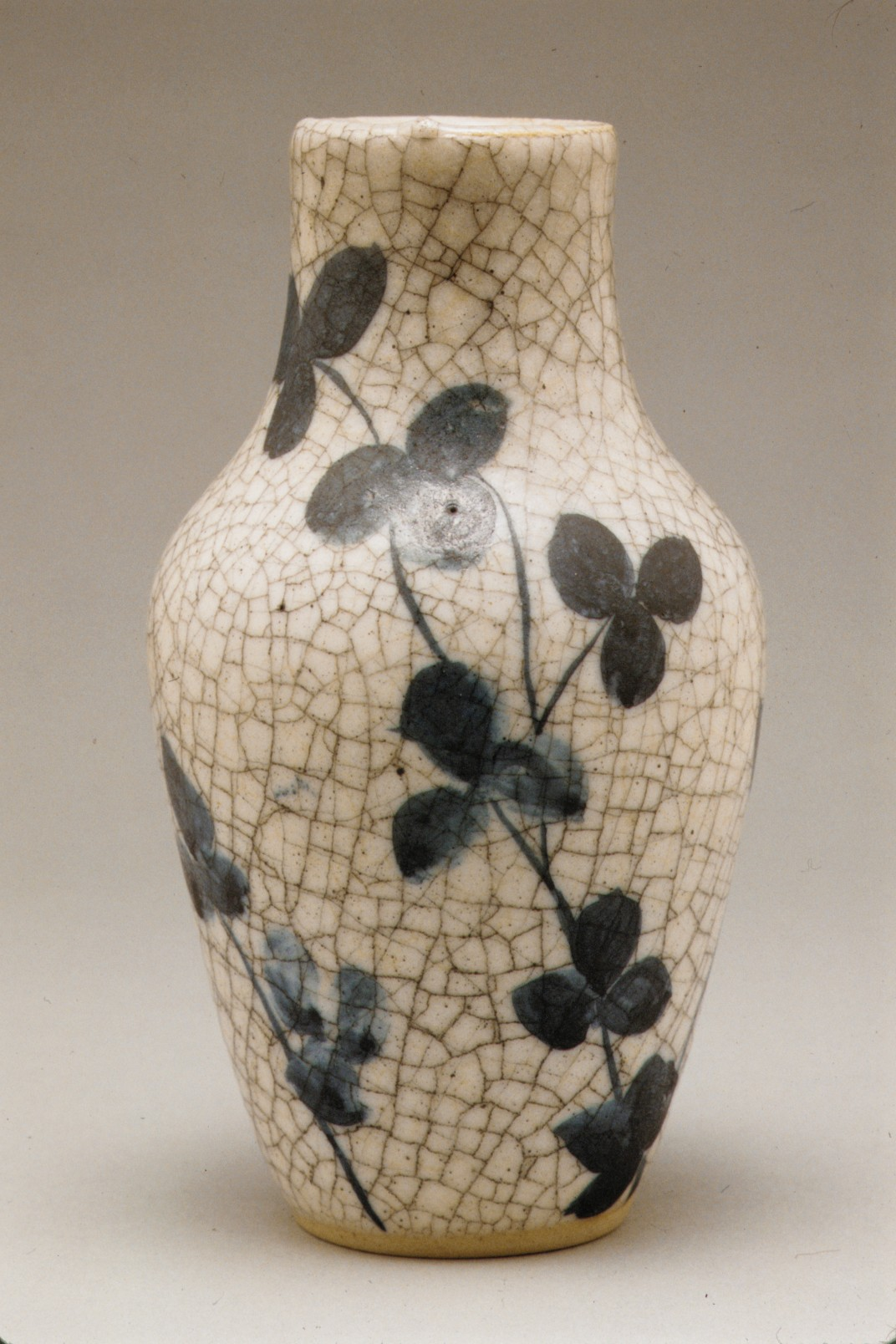
American art pottery, vase by Hugh C. Robertson, Dedham Pottery, (CKAW) c. 1886-89, with deliberate crackle glaze in the Chinese style.

During drying, the pictorial layer tends to shrink as volatile solvents evaporate. Non-uniform shrinkage across the painting surface is caused by differential adhesion to the sublayer by different paint species and leads to large tensile stresses in the top paint layer. Crack formation during drying depends strongly on adhesion to the sublayer, paint film thickness, composition, and the mechanical properties of the sublayer. Craquelure formed during the drying process appears within days of painting and is characterized by shallow cracks that are localized to the topmost layers of paint. This localization results from capillary forces, which constrain drying stresses to the free surface of the painting. Drying cracks are usually isotropic due to the fine dispersion of pigment particles within the evaporating volatile solvents.

Crack propagation at a critical strain, $\epsilon_m$, is opposed by an unfavorable increase in surface energy as the crack elongates and promoted by a release in the elastic energy of the material near the crack. The condition for the propagation of a drying crack can be evaluated precisely using fracture mechanics.

==== Adhesion to sublayer ====
Crack width is heavily dependent on the ability of the top paint layer to adhere to the sublayer. If poor adhesion between these layers occurs, the pictorial layer can slide over the sublayer and create dramatic, wide cracks in response to uneven tensile strains during solvent evaporation. Unlike aging cracks, the width of drying cracks is highly varying as a result. Poor adhesion can occur if the painter mixes too much oil or other fatty substance into the sublayer material.

==== Film thickness ====
Below a critical film thickness, $h_c$, the pictorial layer will remain crack-free. Cracks are not able to propagate in thin films because the decrease in elastic energy as the crack elongates is not enough to negate the concurrent increase in surface energy. The critical film thickness is approximated by:

$$h_c = \frac{E_p\Gamma}{Z\sigma^2}$$

where $E_p$ is the elastic modulus of the pictorial layer, $\Gamma$ the surface energy of this layer, Z a dimensionless constant that depends on the cracking pattern, and $\sigma$ the stress experienced during drying.

Films thicker than this critical value display networks of cracks. The degree of connectivity between nucleation sites increases with film thickness, so that thicknesses near the critical value are characterized by isolated star-shaped crack junctions and thick films show more complete networks.

==== Sublayer properties ====
The spacing of cracks during drying depends strongly on the stiffness of the support, or sublayer. An infinitely stiff sublayer does not contribute to the strain in the pictorial layer, so that $\epsilon_p=\epsilon_m$, where $\epsilon_p$ is the stiffness of the pictorial layer. The crack spacing for an infinitely stiff support is approximated by:

$$d \approx \frac{4h\Gamma}{E_pa\epsilon_m^2}$$

where $h$ is the thickness of the pictorial layer, $\Gamma$ the surface energy of the pictorial layer, $E_p$ the elastic modulus of the pictorial layer, and $a$ the depth of the crack.

For a less stiff sublayer, an additional strain in the sublayer, $\epsilon_s$, lessens the strain in the pictorial layer such that $\epsilon_m - \epsilon_s = \epsilon_p$. If the ratio of the strains between the two layers is approximately the same as the ratio of their elastic moduli, the crack spacing for a support with finite stiffness can be approximated as:

$$d \approx \frac{4h\Gamma}{E_pa\epsilon_p^2(1+E_p/E_s)^2}$$

where $E_s$ is the elastic modulus of the sublayer. The denominator in this approximation indicates that crack spacing is dependent on the mismatch in the elastic moduli of the two layers; therefore, regions with stiffer paints tend to have cracks that are more spread out.

==== Other effects ====
Changes in the relative humidity during the drying process affect both the ground layer and support of a painting, promoting crack propagation. Paintings involving hygroscopic materials like wood supports or gesso ground layers are especially susceptible to variations in relative humidity. Gesso is brittle at relative humidities (RH) below 75%; as RH increases, gesso becomes less stiff and transitions to a ductile state. Variations in RH cause highly non-uniform tensile strains across the gesso surface, and when the material contracts upon drying, it fractures. Craquelure formed during gesso drying are particularly noticeable.

Similarly, wood supports respond significantly to changes in RH. Wood grains tend to swell perpendicular to the grain axis when they are exposed to moisture. As a wet ground layer is applied to the surface of a wood support, the wood in contact with the layer swells while the back of the panel remains unchanged. This can contribute to cupping, in which the panel of wood starts to bow transverse to the wood grain. The increased strains on the convex side of the cupped wood panel causes further fracture in the ground layer as it dries.

=== Craquelure during aging ===
Compared to their drying counterparts, aging cracks are sharper, deeper, and are developed over the lifetime of the painting. This type of craquelure is much more difficult to predict and model because it depends on the specific environmental changes and chemical aging reactions the paint is subjected to. Critical processes that contribute to aging craquelure include direct impacts, gradients in temperature and relative humidity, support deformation, restoration processes like canvas reinforcement and stretching, and oxidation reactions that make the surface chalky or more brittle. In general, the pictorial layer becomes more brittle as it ages, which makes it unable to accommodate the stresses induced by environmental factors.

=== Induced craquelure ===
Induced craquelure can be created by a variety of techniques, and in paintings is often used by forgers of Old Master paintings, which would normally show some. Art forger Eric Hebborn developed a technique and Tony Tetro discovered a way to use formaldehyde and a special baking process. Craquelure is almost impossible to accurately reproduce artificially in a particular pattern, although there are some methods such as baking or finishing of a painting by which this is attempted. These methods, however, generally achieve cracks that are uniform in appearance, while genuine craquelure has cracks with irregular patterns.

Craquelure is frequently induced by using zinc white paints as the underlayer in pentimento techniques. Zinc whites with small zinc oxide particles (~250 nm) are more successful at inducing craquelure than larger particles because it does not adhere to the sublayer. Additionally, zinc white paints using linoleic acid-based binders are more successful at producing craquelure than paints with other binders.

== In ceramics ==
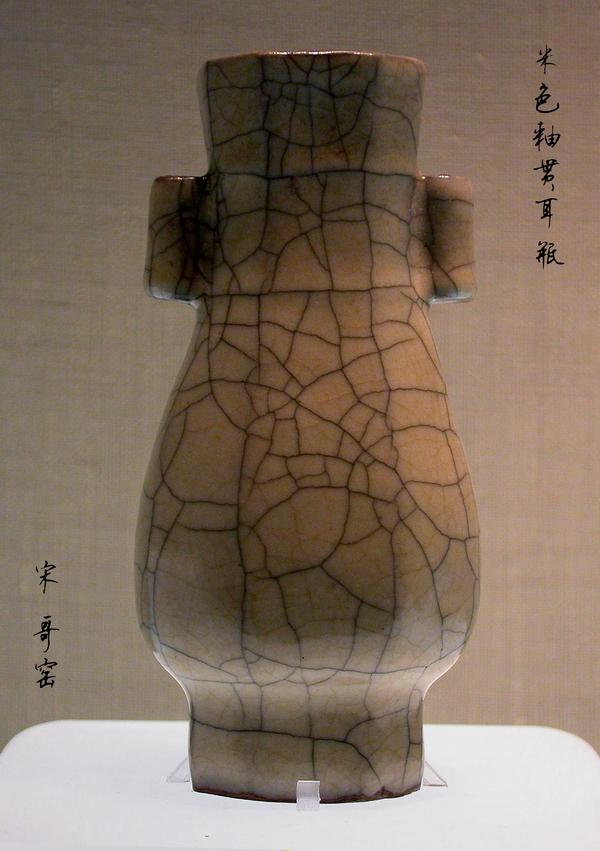
Ge-type vase, with "gold thread and iron wire" double crackle, dated by the Palace Museum Beijing to the Song dynasty

Craquelure affecting the glaze in ceramics may develop with age but has also been used as a deliberate decorative effect, which has a long history in Korean and Chinese pottery in particular. These deliberate glazing effects are usually known as "crackle", with crackle[d] glaze or "crackle porcelain" being common terms. It is typically distinguished from crazing, which is accidental craquelure arising as a glaze defect, although in some cases, experts have difficulty in deciding whether milder effects are deliberate or not. Some may also only have developed with age. Leading Chinese wares of the Song and Yuan dynasties with deliberate crackle glazes are Guan ware and Ge ware; in Ru ware, the milder crackle may be accidental, though the majority of pieces have it.

Ge ware can have a type of double crackle, known as "gold thread and iron wire", where there are two patterns, one with wide and large crackle and the other with a finer network. Each set of cracks has had the effect heightened by applying a coloured stain, in different colours. There are multiple layers of glaze, and the wider crackle develops first, with the finer one developing inside those sections. The crackle may take some time to appear after firing and is probably mainly caused by rapid cooling and perhaps low silica in the glaze.

== Modern applications ==
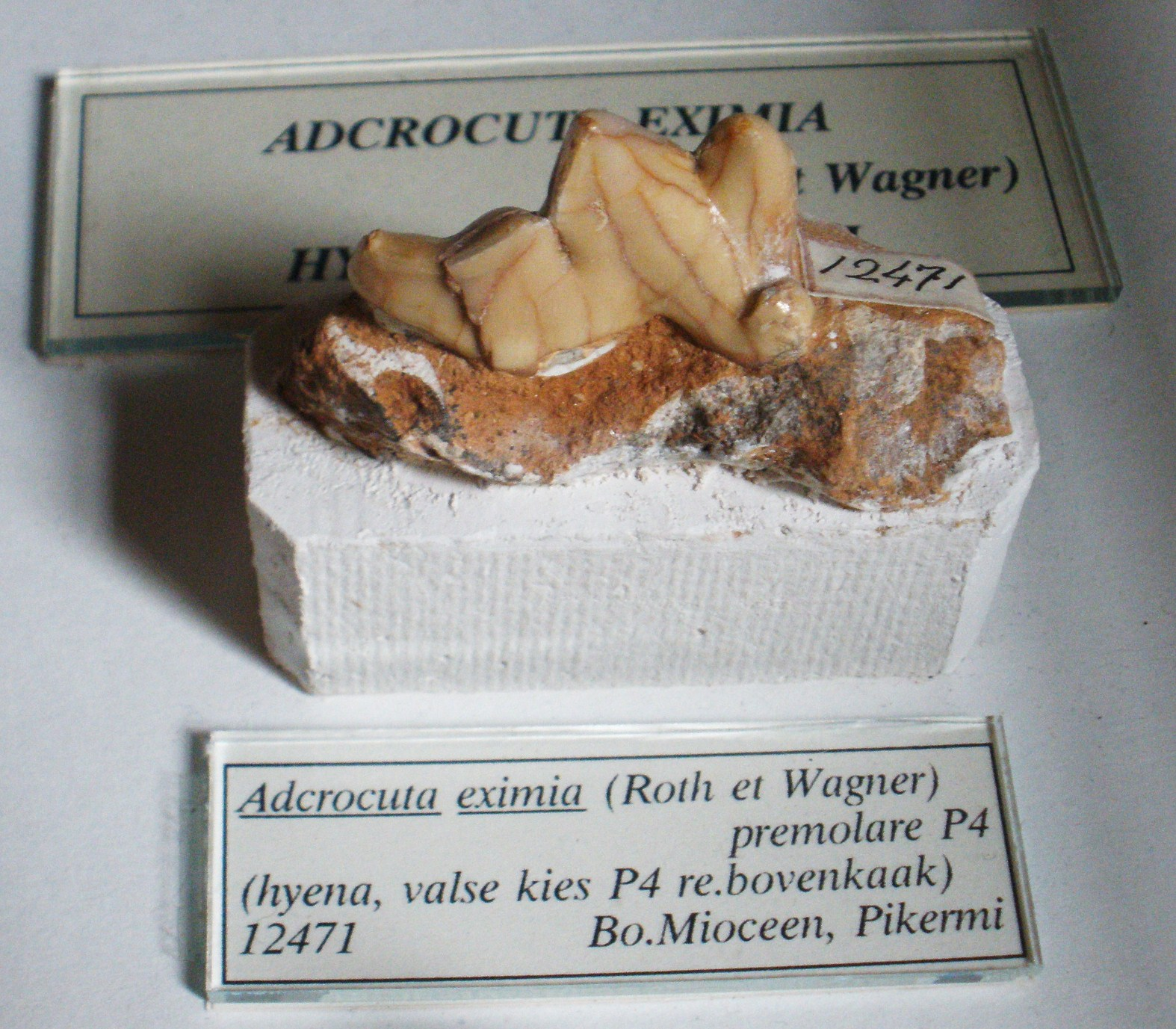
Craquelure in fossilized hyena tooth

=== Acrylic craquelure ===
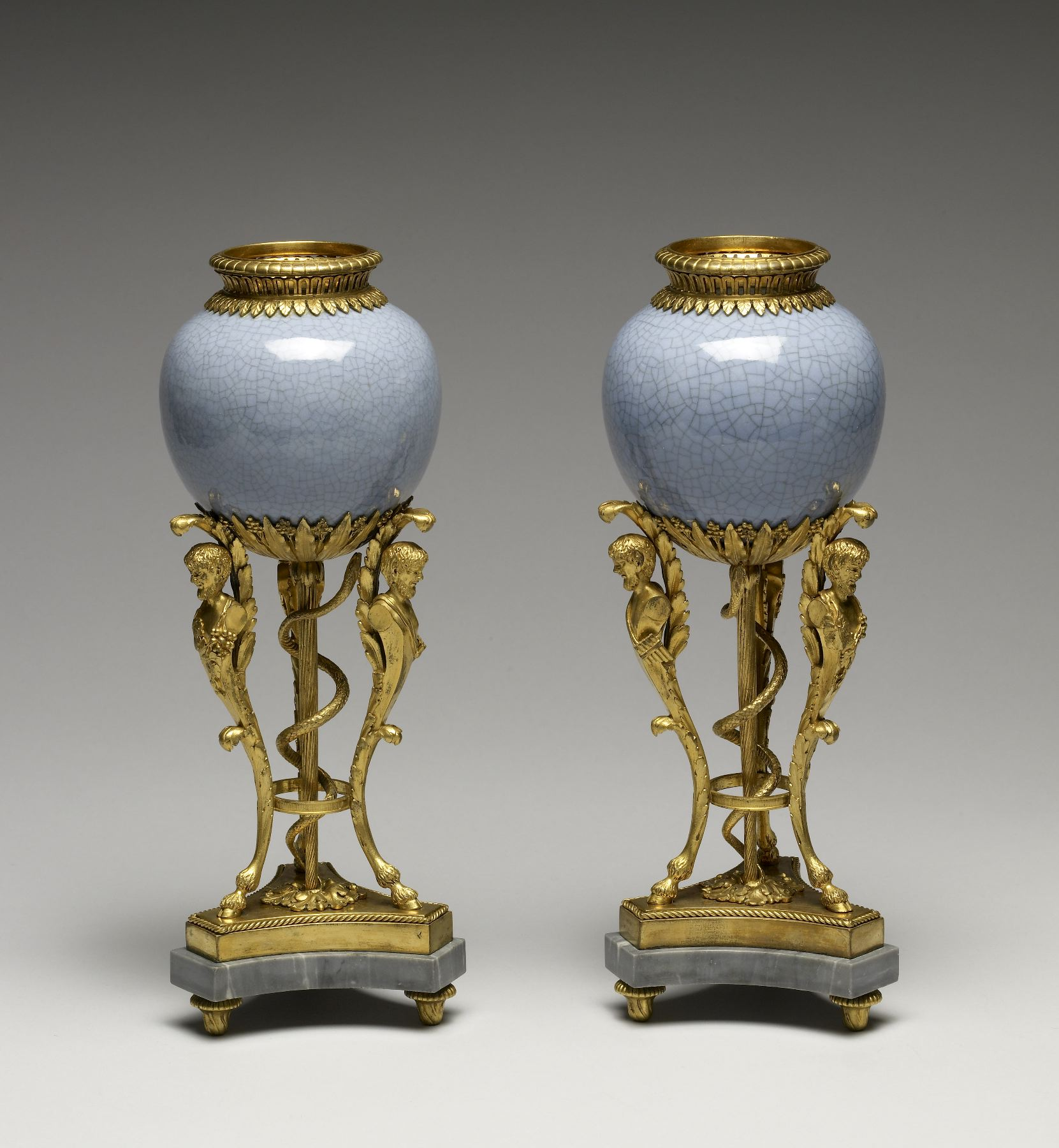
Pair of Chinese crackled glaze jars with French ormolu mounts, both 18th century

The modern decor industry has used the technique of craquelure to create various objects and materials such as glass, ceramics, iron. This was made possible by the use of marketing kits that react with the colors used in decorative acrylic colors. The extent of craquelure produced varies according to the percentage of reagent and time of use. To highlight the cracks, glitter powder—usually available in copper, bronze and gold—is used. Mixing different brands of ready-made products to mimic craquelure results in various sizes and patterns of cracks. Software programs are available for creating craquelure in digital photos.

=== Use in art authentication ===
Methods that utilize craquelure as a means of detecting art forgery have been proposed. Historical craquelure patterns are difficult to reproduce and are therefore a useful tool in authenticating art. Modern detection techniques rely on feature extraction at crack junctions and image matching to verify the authenticity of artwork with high accuracy.

== See also ==
- Crazing
- Patina
- Mudcrack

== Sources ==
- Bucklow, Spike, "A Stylometric Analysis of Craquelure", Computers and the Humanities, Vol. 31, No. 6 (1997/1998), pp. 503–521, Springer, JSTOR
- Vainker, S.J., Chinese Pottery and Porcelain, 1991, British Museum Press, 9780714114705
- Ward, Gerald W.R. (ed), Grove Encyclopedia Of Materials and Techniques in Art, 2008, Oxford University Press, ISBN 0195313917, 9780195313918, google books
