= Epoxy glazing =

Ceramic fixtures are being more commonly glazed with 2 part epoxy compounds. The first component is a clear or opaque resin combined with a catalyst or hardener. The proper procedure requires that the nonporous fixture be sand blasted to create a rough surface for the epoxy primer to adhere to. Once the primer has dried the topcoat is applied. Since a true epoxy begins to yellow at the age of 1 year acrylic polyurethane compound is used in the topcoat. This resin is also catalyzed with a hardener and can last up to 15 years or more with proper maintenance.

Formica countertops can also be glazed in this fashion using a faux stone or granite look.

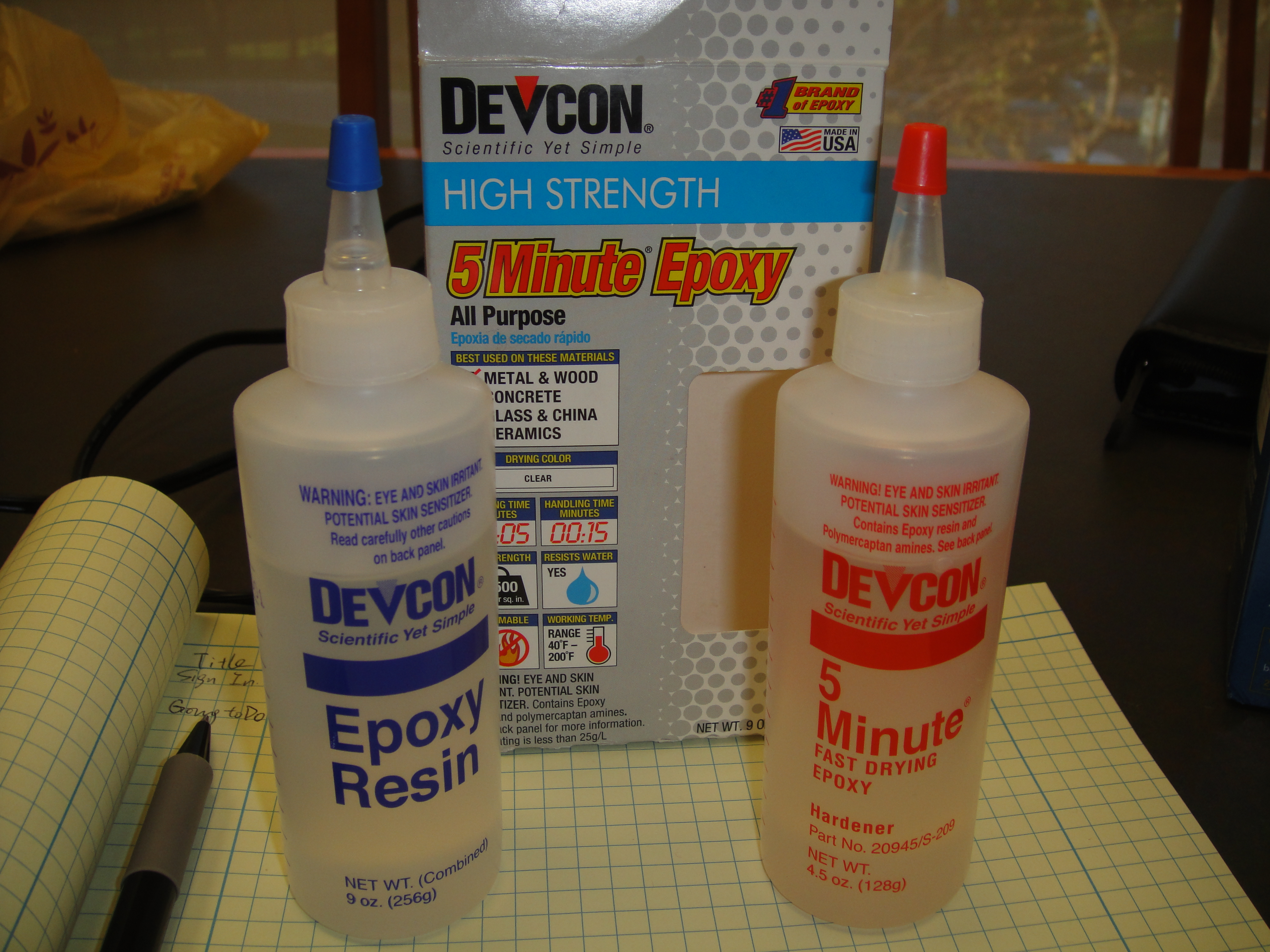
The blue one is Epoxy Resin, the red one is Epoxy Hardener.
