= Hangnail (disambiguation) =

A hangnail is a skin lesion.

Hangnail may also refer to:

- Hangnail (band), a Christian punk musical group
- "Hangnail", a song by Nickelback from the album Silver Side Up, 2001
