= Glaze (painting technique) =

Thin, transparent or semi-transparent layer of paint

A glaze is a thin transparent or semi-transparent layer on a painting which modifies the appearance of the underlying paint layer. Glazes can change the chroma, value, hue and texture of a surface. Glazes consist of a great amount of binding medium in relation to a very small amount of pigment. Drying time will depend on the amount and type of paint medium used in the glaze. The medium, base, or vehicle is the mixture to which the dry pigment is added. Different media can increase or decrease the rate at which oil paints dry.

Often, because a paint is too opaque, painters will add a medium like linseed oil or alkyd to the paint to make it more transparent and pliable for the purposes of glazing. In painting, linseed oil is in use since the Middle Ages and alkyd since the introduction of industrially manufactured alkyds in the 20th century. While these media are usually liquids, there are solid and semi-solid media used in the making of paints as well. For example, many classical oil painters have also been known to use ground glass and semi-solid resins to increase the translucency of their paint.

== Oil painting ==
In oil painting, the simplest form of a glaze is a thin, oily, transparent layer of paint spread over the top of an opaque passage that has been given some time to dry. Light travels through the glaze and is reflected back off of the opaque layer below. This can cause a glowing effect similar to looking at a brightly lit white wall behind a film of colored cellophane. The thin oily layers of a glaze can facilitate the rendering of details that would be more difficult with opaque paints—e.g. the complexities of skin tones.

When multiple layers of glazes are used, the colors in all visible layers can appear combined. However, the pigments are not physically mixed, since the paint is left to dry before each successive glaze is applied. The artist may apply several layers of paint with increasing amounts of oil added to each successive layer. This process of applying the fat layers (more oil in the painter's medium) over the lean layers (less oil) can minimize cracking; this is the "fat over lean" principle.

Many painters juxtapose glazes and opaque, thick or textured types of paint application (that appear to push forward) as a means to increase surface variety, which some painters feel increases a painting's drama, brightness, and depth.

Scumble is a technique similar to glazing, except that the coating is opaque, and is just painted on very thinly to allow bits of the paint below to shine through. Scumbling works by a principle similar to that used by pointillists, mixing colors optically. While most painters glaze with dark colors, scumbling is more popularly used for lighter colors; especially atmospheric effects when rendering fog or clouds.

== Wall glazing ==
When the technique is used for wall glazing, the entire surface is covered, often showing traces of texture (French brush, parchment, striae, rag rolling). Either oil-based or water-based materials are used for glazing walls, depending upon the desired effect. Kerosene or linseed oil may be used to extend the "open" or working time of oil-based glazes. Water-based glazes are sometimes thinned with glycerin or another wetting agent to extend the working time. In general, water glazes are best suited to rougher textures where overlaps of color are acceptable.

Glaze is also used in cabinet, furniture, and faux finishing.

== See also ==
- Acrylic painting techniques
- Color wash
- Epoxy glazing
- Faux painting
- Rag painting
- Strié
