= Hugh C. Robertson =

American studio potter

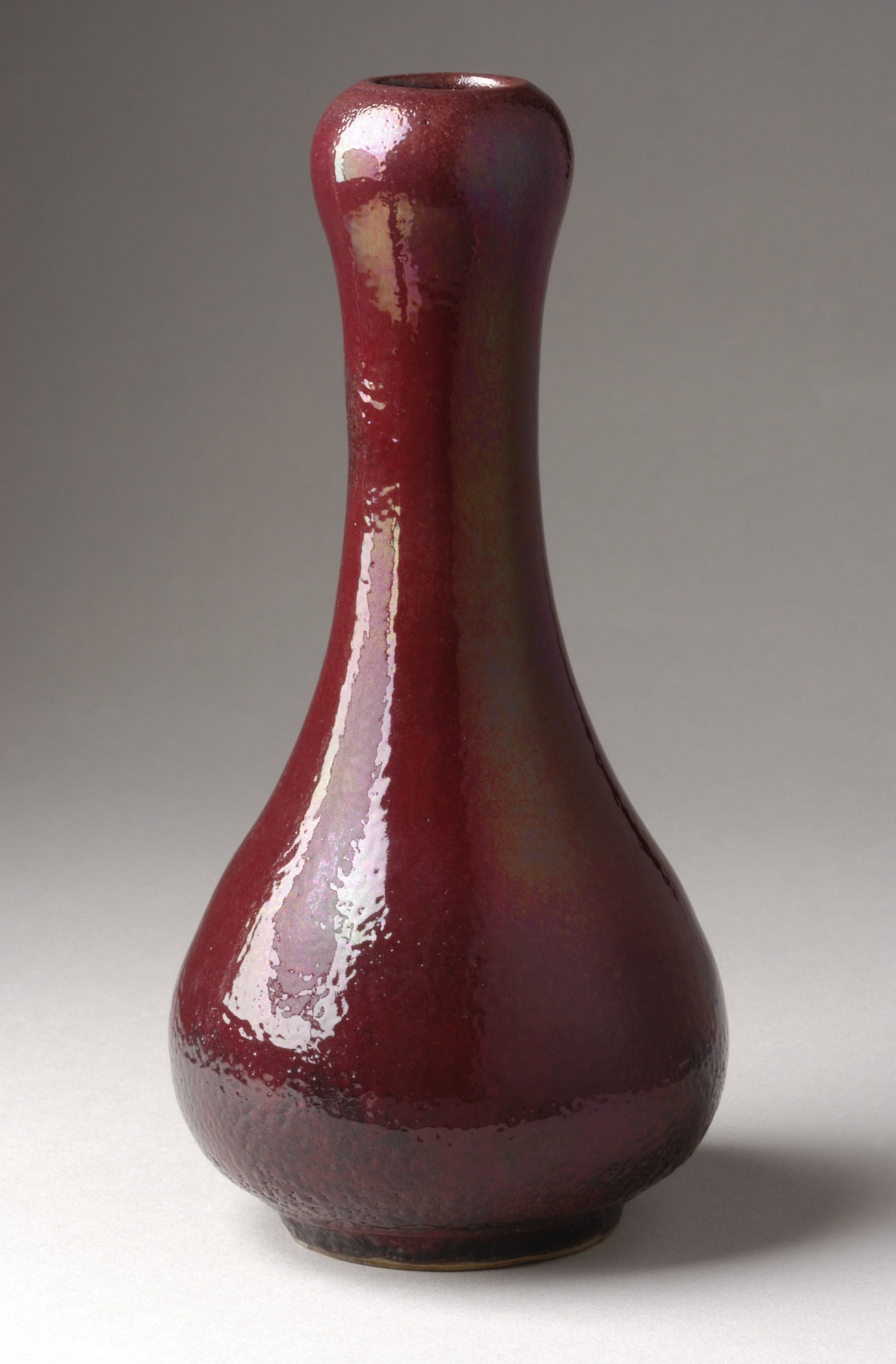
Oxblood glaze vase by Hugh Robertson while at Chelsea Keramic Art Works (CKAW), 1884-89

Hugh C. Robertson (1845–1908) was the first American studio potter who experimented with new ceramic glazes. Born in England, Robertson apprenticed at the Jersey City Potter in 1860. In 1868, he started work in his father's shop that had opened in 1866 in Chelsea, Massachusetts. In 1872 the factory was incorporated into the Chelsea Keramic Art Works (CKAW). The company became known for their antique Grecian terra cotta and Pompeian bronzes. In 1877, Robertson developed the Chelsea faience, underglazed opaque earthenware, which led the development of other American faience. There in 1884, Robertson worked on discovering the famous Chinese sang de boeuf glaze. In 1888, he finally discovered the recipe for the glaze and produced three hundred pieces of what he dubbed, Sang de Chelsea.

The Arts and Crafts, and the Art Pottery Movement owes much to Hugh Robertson. After years of experimentation, and eventual artistic success, Hugh Robertson exhausted the finances of the Chelsea Keramic Art Works and the studio closed in 1889. He did not return to the pottery world until July 17, 1891, when he established Chelsea Pottery, US in Dedham, Massachusetts. Robertson later went on to success in 1895, with the Dedham Pottery Company, in good part based on his glaze's success at the Chelsea Keramic Art Works.

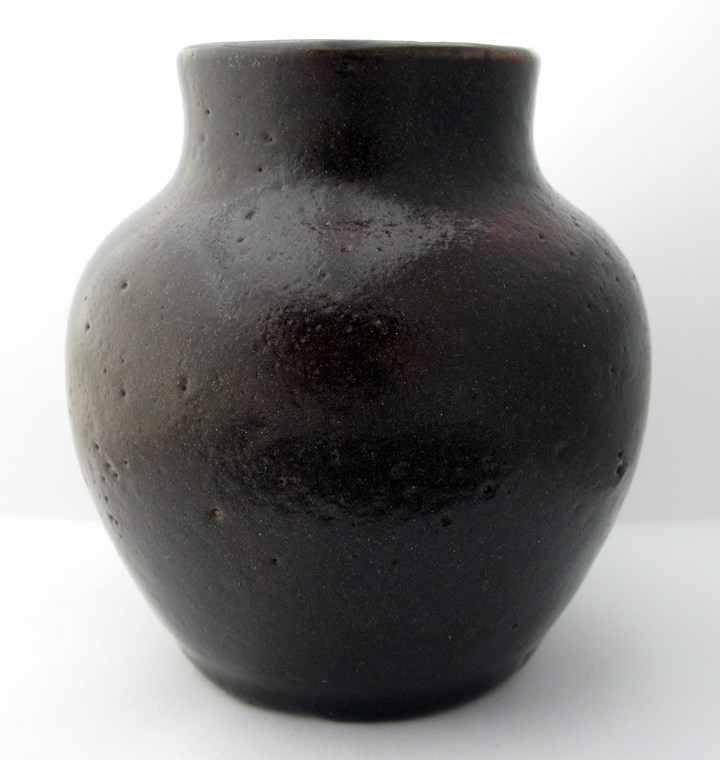
Experimental Oxblood glaze vase by Hugh Robertson while at Chelsea Keramic Art Works (CKAW)

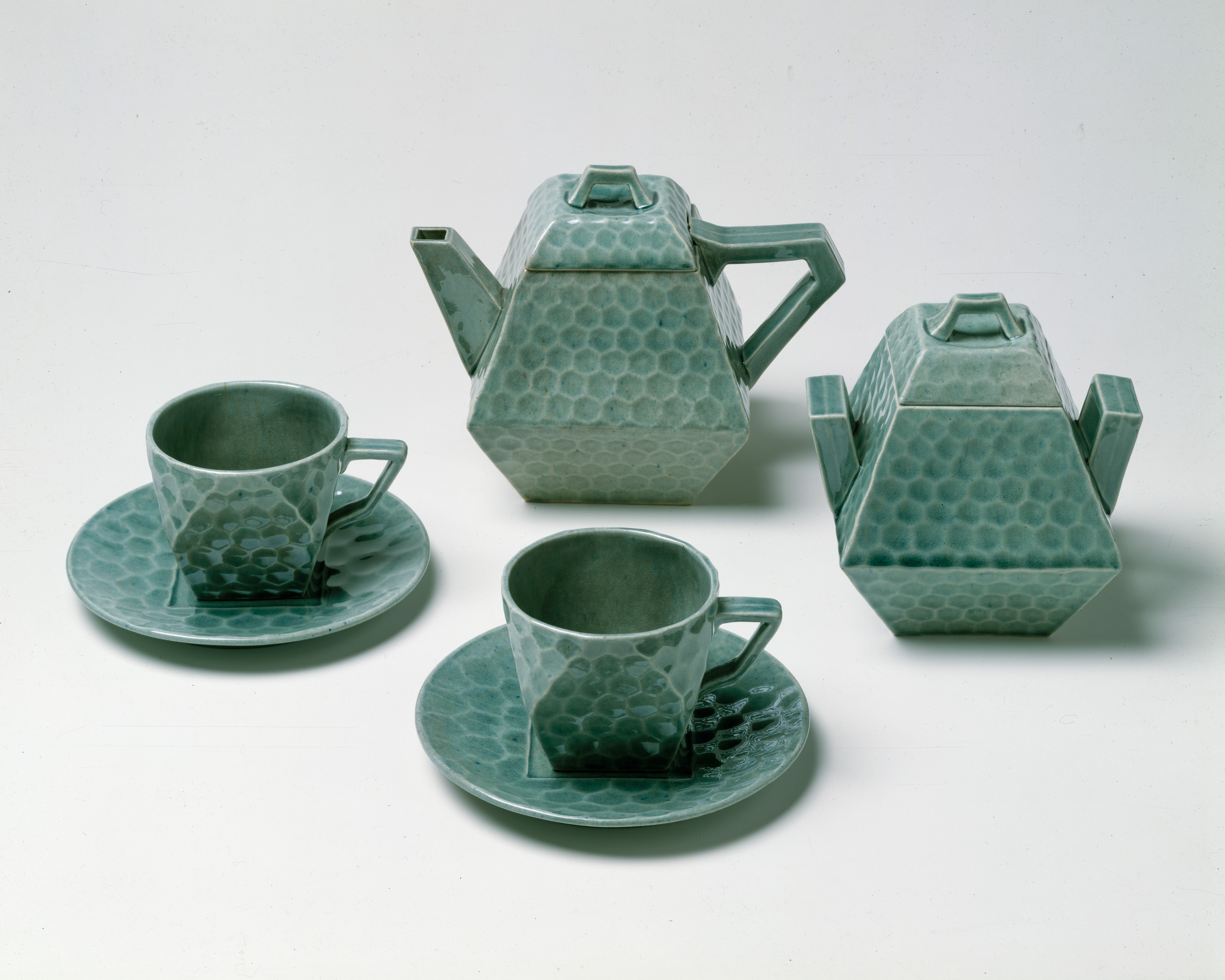
Chelsea Keramic Art Works tea set, earthenware, 1879–83
