= Paint stripper =

Chemical product that removes paint, finishes, and coatings

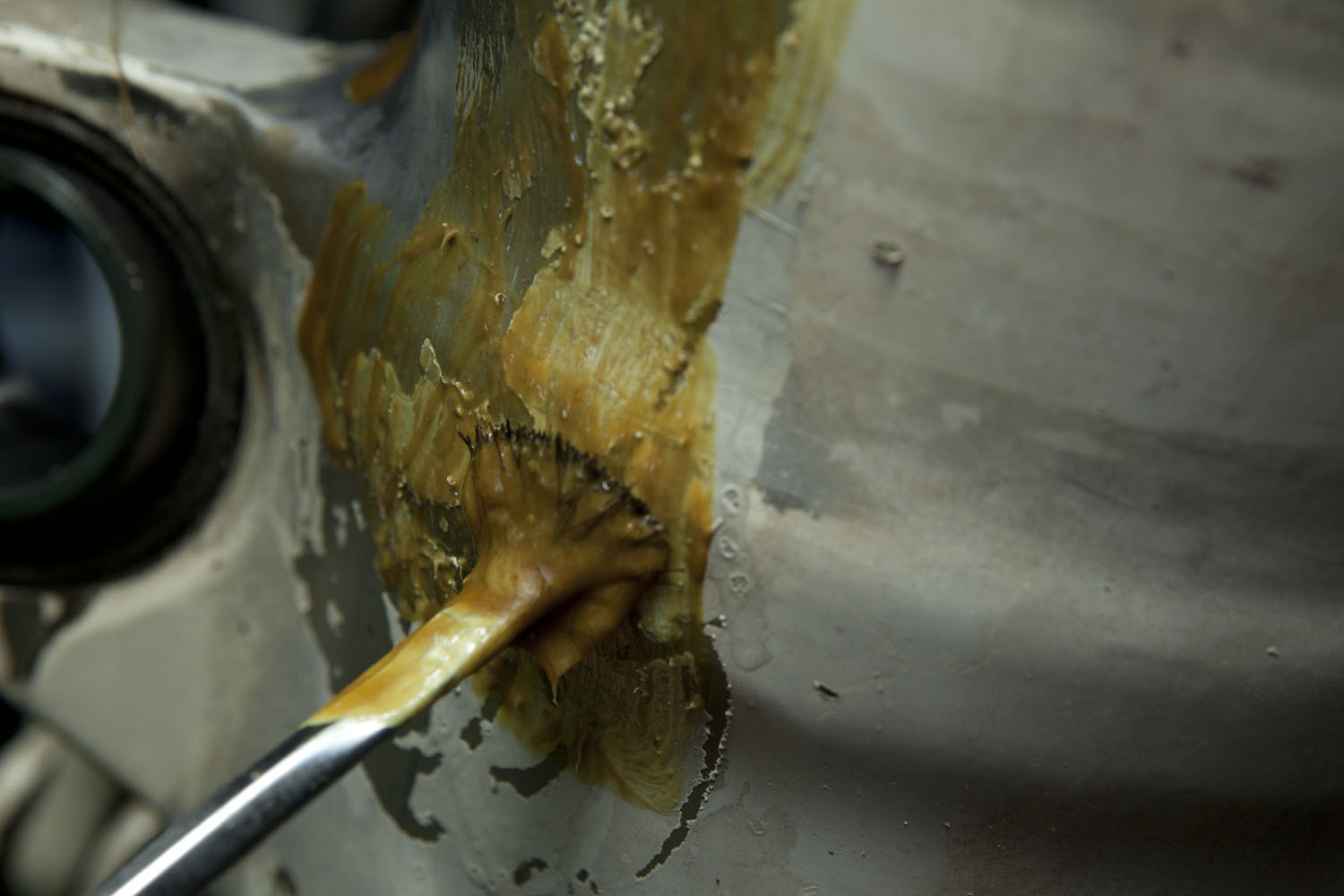
Paint remover is applied to an aircraft's landing gear during an inspection looking for cracks in the aluminum

Paint stripper or paint remover is a chemical product designed to remove paint, finishes, and coatings, while also cleaning the underlying surface. Chemical paint removers are advantageous because they act on any kind of geometry and they are cheap. They can however be slow acting.

Paint can also be removed using mechanical methods (scraping or sanding) or heat (hot air, radiant heat, or steam).

== Types ==
The selection of chemical paint removers is based on the chemical bonds that form the paint's binder. Two basic categories of chemical paint removers are caustic and solvent.

=== Caustics ===
Caustic paint removers, typically aqueous sodium hydroxide (also known as lye or caustic soda), work by breaking down the chemical bonds of the paint, usually by hydrolysis of the esters that comprise the paint film. Caustic removers must be neutralized or the new finish will fail prematurely. In addition, as caustic paint strippers typically include corrosive active ingredients, several side effects and health risks must be taken into account in using. Caustic aqueous solutions are typically used by antique dealers who aim to restore old furniture by stripping off worn varnishes, for example.

=== Solvents ===
Solvent-based paint strippers can be complex mixtures of various organic solvents, emulsifiers, thickening agents, alkaline or acid active ingredients as well as evaporation and corrosion inhibitors. Dichloromethane, also called methylene chloride, is a popular solvent, but its use has been declining because of health concerns. Traditional solvent paint strippers penetrate the layers of paint and break the bond between the paint and the object by swelling the paint.

Aside from dichloromethane, some popular stripping solvents are N-methylpyrrolidone, dimethylformamide, benzyl alcohol, and dimethyl adipate. None of these are chlorocarbons.

Paint strippers come in a liquid, or a gel ("thixotropic") form that clings even to vertical surfaces.

Solvent strippers may also have formulations with limonene (obtained from orange peels) (or other terpene solvents). Nitromethane is another commonly used solvent. Dimethyl sulfoxide is a less toxic alternative solvent used in some formulations. These alternatives are less effective than strippers based on dichloromethane.

== Alternatives ==
Heat guns are an alternative to chemical paint strippers. When heated, softened paint clumps and is easier to contain. High-temperature heat guns at 1,100 °F (590 °C) or more create toxic lead fumes in lead-based paint, but low-temperature heat guns and 400 °F (200 °C) infrared paint removers do not create lead fumes. Fire is a possible hazard of using heat guns.

Steam can be used on large surfaces or items to be stripped, such as window sash, can be placed inside a steam box.

== Safety ==
A product's material safety data sheet can provide more safety information than its product labels.

Many traditional paint strippers were or are based on dichloromethane, which can pose serious health risks and is banned in the United States and European Union for consumer use. Deaths from dichloromethane were rare at fewer than 2.4 cases per year and associated mostly with users applying large amounts in confined, poorly ventilated spaces.

Removing old lead-based paint can disperse lead and cause lead poisoning; some U.S. regulations address removal of old paint that could contain lead.

== See also ==
- Distressing
- Nitromors
