= Color wash =

Example of a color wash in multiple hues

A color wash is a popular technique in faux painting using paint thinned out with glaze to create a subtle wash of color over walls or other surfaces.

Color washing gives a surface a translucent, watercolor appearance. It can be used to add texture or accentuate natural surfaces. It can be applied in any color of paint, generally with brushes over a solid paint color, using long sweeping strokes to meld the glaze colors together.
