= Faux painting =

Terms to describe paint finishes that replicate the appearance of other materials

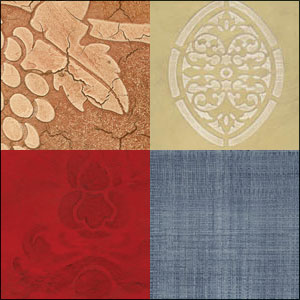
Examples of faux paintings.

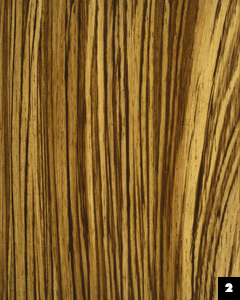
Example of the faux painting of a wood design

Faux painting or faux finishing are terms used to describe decorative paint finishes that replicate the appearance of materials such as marble, wood or stone. The term comes from the French word faux, meaning false, as these techniques started as a form of replicating materials such as marble and wood with paint, but has subsequently come to encompass many other decorative finishes for walls and furniture including simulating recognisable textures and surfaces.

== History ==
Faux finishing has been used for millennia, from cave painting to the tombs of ancient Egypt, but what we generally think of as faux finishing in the decorative arts began with plaster and stucco finishes in Mesopotamia over 5,000 years ago.

Faux painting became popular in classical times in the forms of faux marble, faux wood, and trompe-l'œil murals. Artists would apprentice for 10 years or more with a master faux painter before working on their own. Great recognition was awarded to artists who could actually trick viewers into believing their work was the real thing.

The 1911 Encyclopædia Britannica Eleventh Edition, in discussing the work of house and decorative painters, describes a number of faux-finishes including marbleizing and graining. Faux painting has continued to be popular throughout the ages, but experienced major resurgences in the neoclassical revival of the nineteenth century and the Art Deco styles of the 1920s. During the recent history of decorative painting, faux finishing has been mainly used in commercial and public spaces.

== 20th century revival ==
In the late 1980s and early 1990s, faux finishing saw another revival, as wallpaper began to fall out of fashion. At this point, faux painting became popular in home environments, with high-end homes leading the trend. While it can be quite expensive to hire a professional faux finisher ($80.00/hr.), many faux painting methods are thought to be simple enough for a beginning home owner to create with a little instruction. Some professionally applied finishes in the high-end, Bay-Area homes of northern California, for example, were as simple as oil glaze, oil-based paint or penetrol or as complicated as applications with peacock feathers and 4 different colors applied using 4 different techniques.

In modern-day faux finishing, there are two major processes used. Glaze work involves using a translucent mixture of paint and glaze applied with a brush, roller, rag, or sponge, and often mimics textures, but it is always smooth to the touch. Plaster work can be done with tinted plasters, or washed over with earth pigments, and is generally applied with a trowel or spatula. The finished result can be either flat to the touch or textured.

== Faux finishes ==
- Marbleizing or faux marbling is used to make walls and furniture look like real marble. This can be done using either plaster or glaze techniques.
- Fresco is a simple technique, uses mixtures of tint and joint compound to add mottled color and subtle texture to plain walls,
- Graining, wood graining, or faux bois (French for "fake wood") is often used to imitate exotic or hard-to-find wood varieties.
- Trompe-l'œil, "fool the eye" in French, is a realistic painting technique often used in murals, and to create architectural details as well as depth and 3 dimensionality.
- Venetian plaster is a smooth and often shiny plaster design that appears textured but is smooth to the touch. Venetian plaster is one of the most traditional plaster decorations. Authentic Venetian Plaster is made from marble dust and ground up limestone.
- Color wash is a free-form finish that creates subtle variations of color using multiple hues of glaze blended together with a paint brush.
- Strié, from the French for "stripe" or "streak", is a glazing technique that creates soft thin streaks of color using a paint brush. It is a technique often used to simulate fabrics such as linen and denim.
- Rag painting or ragging is a glazing technique using twisted or bunched up rags to create a textural pattern.
- Sponging is a free-form finish achieved by applying glaze to the wall by dabbing a sea sponge, in various shapes to achieve either simple design (resembling the wall papers) and more sophisticated ones.
