= Florentine crafts =

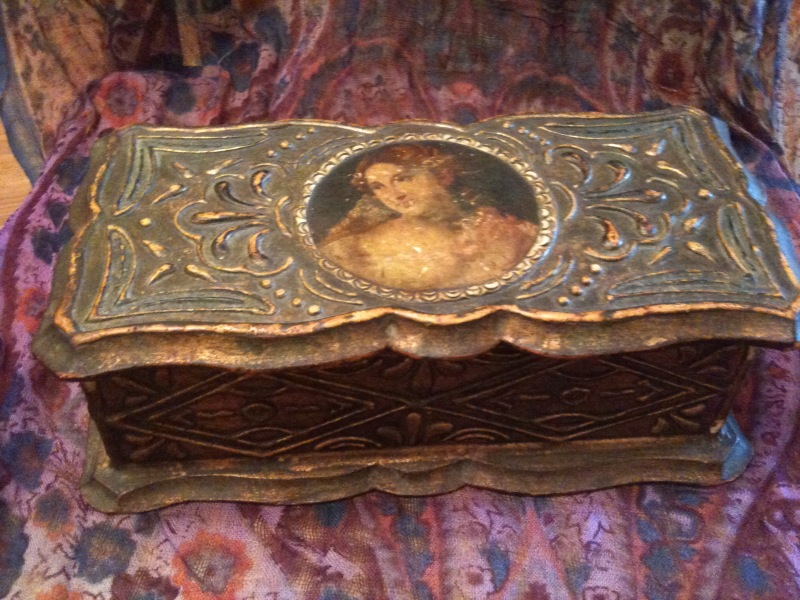
Florentine craft box with decoupage and painted gold gilding.

Florentine crafts made in Florence, Italy, are a centuries-old tradition maintained by several artisan guilds. Florentine style, especially in items produced in the mid-19th century onward, typically reflect a contemporary interpretation of Renaissance art and furnishings. Popular items made in Florentine style include gilded picture frames, gilded leather, reproduction furniture, gilded decoupage plaques and triptychs, and tables inlaid with marble and rare wood.

== Origins ==
During the Renaissance, Florence was renowned throughout Europe as a centre of fine art, particularly in painting, gold gilding, bronze work, and furnishings inlaid with intricate designs in marble or rare wood. The fine craft traditions associated with some of these arts never entirely died out in Florence, and remained well-established up to the 19th century. Florence's craft guilds were a crucial force behind the survival of these trades.

In an effort to boost Florence's economy, and promote its crafts to tourists, a museum of decorative arts opened in the Bargello in 1865. This, in combination with Florence's reputation in fine arts, led to rapid growth in the demand for craft products among tourists, particularly from England. Victorian tourists found many craft shops listed in the back of guide books, such as John Murray's Florence and its Environs.

== Decorative style ==
Florentine style crafts have an ornate appearance, and are typically gold gilded, or have gold paint applied to resemble gilding. Decoupage usually includes reproductions of well-known Classical Florentine art works, which may or may not be religious in nature.

Although the reproductions are in many cases a derivative style imitating fine art and fine objects made of rare materials, Florentine crafts aimed at tourists were fashionable, and termed buen gusto, or fine taste, "pure Italian" or "pure Renaissance style". Florentine gold-gilt frames in particular became popular during the late Victorian era; references to such ornate frames appear in period literature, such as Oscar Wilde's The Picture of Dorian Gray.

Florentine-style crafts remain collectable today. Florentine frames and plaques, and reproduction Florentine furniture, are associated with the Shabby chic style of interior decorating in particular in recent years.

== See also ==
- Artisan
- Florentine school
- Guilds of Florence
