= Conservation and restoration of frescos =

Art preservation techniques

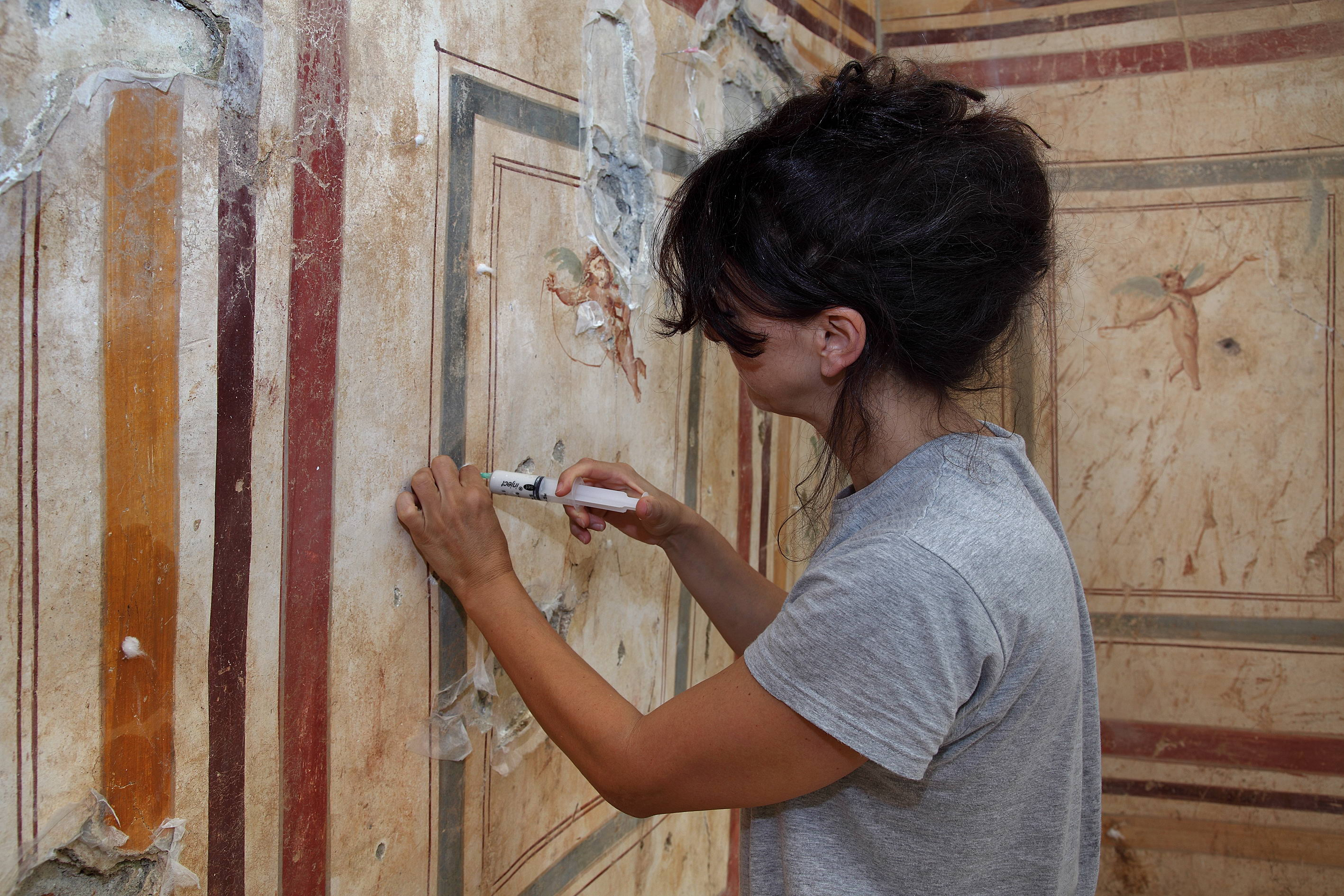
Restoration of wall paintings, Ephesus

The conservation and restoration of frescoes is the process of caring for and maintaining frescos, and includes documentation, examination, research, and treatment to insure their long-term viability, when desired.

== Technology ==
Fresco is a technique of mural painting in which pigment is applied to freshly-laid or wet lime plaster. Water acts as a type of binding agent that allows the pigment to merge with the plaster, and once the plaster sets the painting becomes an integral part of the wall.

=== Materials (chemical make-up) ===
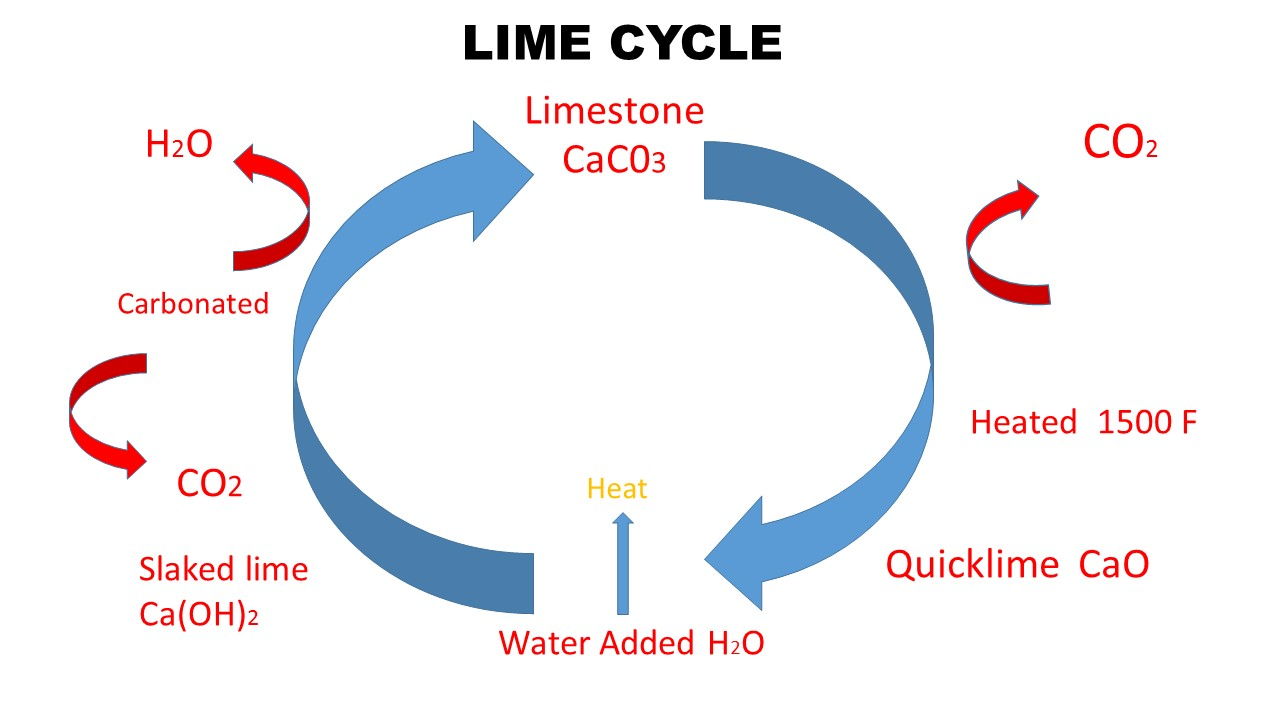
Lime cycle

Fresco chemicals consist of the following:

- Silicon dioxide (sand)
- Calcium oxide (quick lime)
- Water
- Calcium hydroxide (slaked lime)
- Carbon dioxide
- Calcium carbonate (limestone)

Calcium carbonate (limestone) is decomposed by heat to produce calcium oxide (quicklime) and carbon dioxide gas. Then calcium oxide reacts with water to form calcium hydroxide (slaked lime) which is accompanied by the release of heat, a reaction known as exothermic.

=== Pigments used from antiquity to the early 19th century ===
- Carbon black – created by heating wood or other plant material (amphorous carbon)
- Bone black – charring of bones or waste ivory in absence of air (10% carbon, 84% calcium phosphate, 6% carbon carbonate)
- Umber – Natural minerals red bole and cinnabrese with silica and clay attributing to its color (iron(III)-oxide, manganese oxide, aluminum oxide)
- Red ochre – natural minerals containing silica and clay some of which is composed of iron oxide and hematite (anhydrous iron(III)-oxide)
- Yellow ochre – natural minerals that contain silica and clay, and attributing to its color, goethite (iron oxyhydroxide)
- Lime white – chalk (calcium carbonate and calcite)
- Madder lake – an extract from the root of the madder plant (Rubia tintorum)
- Carmine lake – an extract from two types of scale insects: the cochineal and kermes
- Realgar – natural mineral (arsenic sulfide)
- Malachite – natural mineral (basic copper carbonate)
- Orpiment – natural mineral (arsenic sulfide)
- Egyptian blue – first artificial pigment and only used during antiquity (calcium copper silicate)
- Indigo – plant base pigment derived from the woad plant (Isatis tinctoria L.)
- Red lead – natural mineral minium (lead(II,IV)-oxide)
- Green earth – natural minerals glauconite or celadonite (aluminum silicate)

== Deterioration of frescoes ==
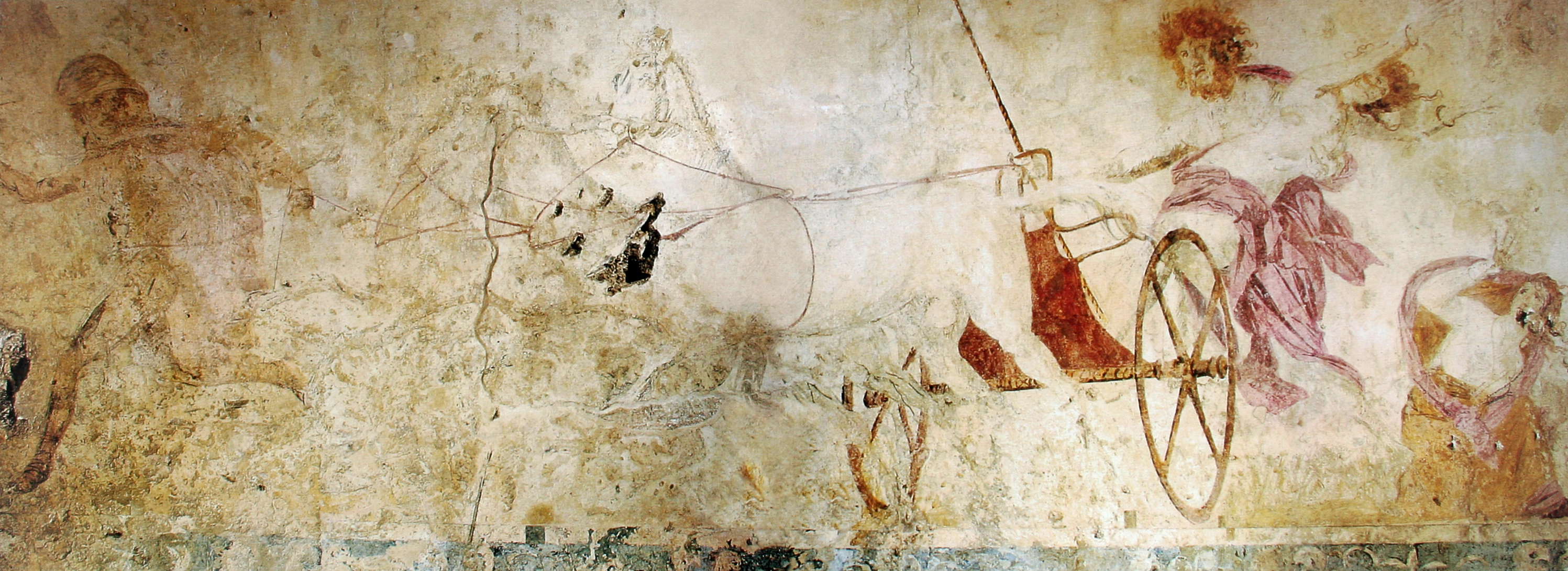
Hades abducting Persephone

Frescoes can be found in places of worship such as churches, ancient temples and tombs, as well as private residences and commercial establishments used for public entertainment. It is these environments and their pollutants that interact with the chemicals, both organic and inorganic, utilized to create the frescoes and the pigments used that contribute to their aesthetic and structural deterioration. Additionally, wall paintings such as frescoes depending on the technique used, possess a layered structure consisting of support, ground or paint layer. These constituents of wall paintings undergo deterioration physically, chemically or biologically. Although factors like moisture, salts, and atmospheric pollution have generally been the main contributors to the deterioration of wall paintings in most cases, many in the field believe the growth of biological agencies like fungi and microbial flora is also responsible for decay.

== Chemical degradation ==
The presence of pigment discoloration, stains and the formation of bio-film are indicative of chemical degradation. Given the variety of organic and inorganic molecules present in frescoes, many type of micro-organisms may grow on the substrate of the fresco provided that environmental conditions (humidity, temperature, light, and pH) are fostered. Chemical deterioration can be attributed to fungi through their metabolites either by assimilation or dissimulation processes. In the assimilation process, the fungi use the components of frescoes as a carbon source through enzyme production, whereas in the dissimulation process, the decay is mainly by the excretion of waste products or secretion of metabolic intermediates including acids and pigments which can damage, stain or disfigure the surface.

== Physical degradation ==
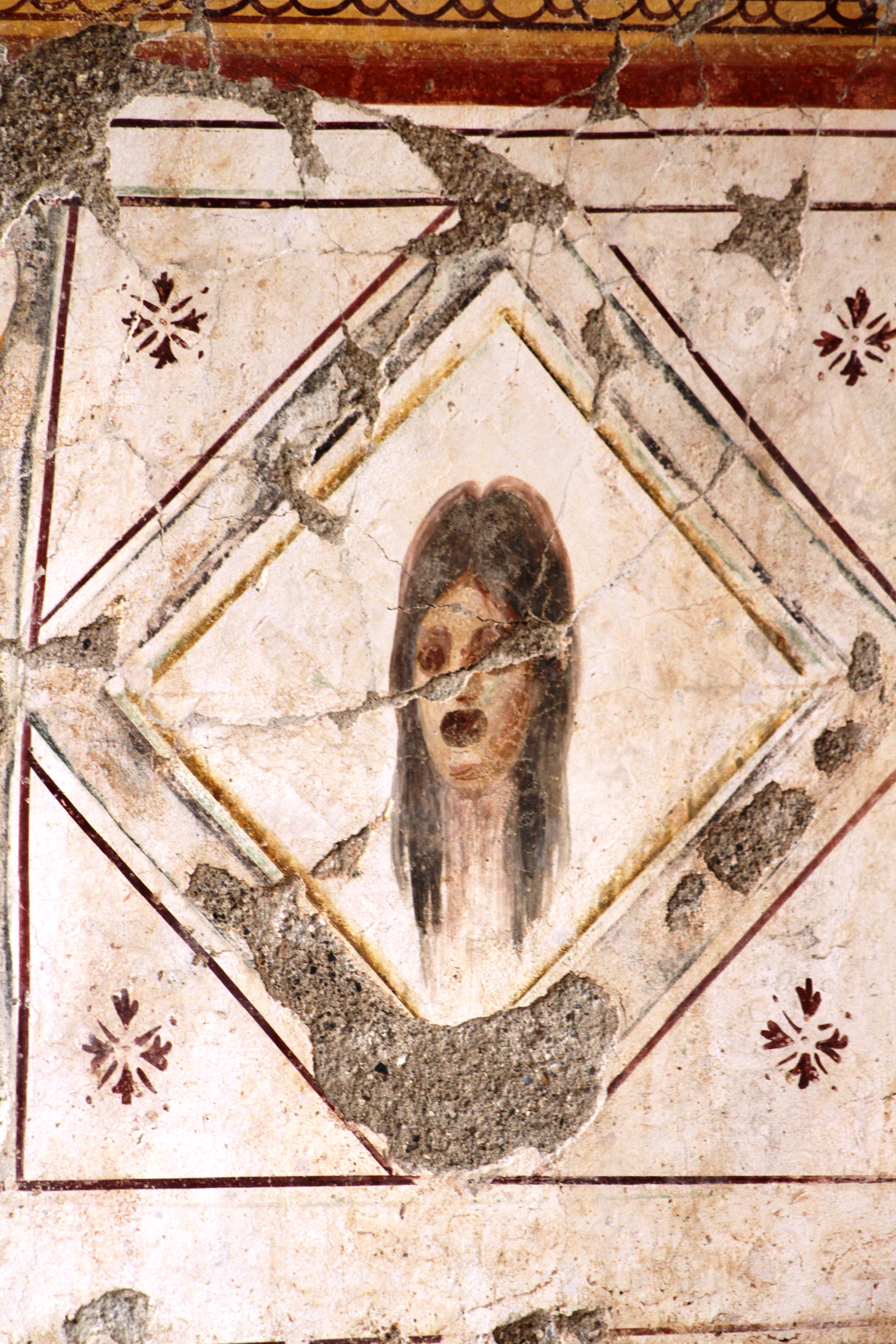
Fresco in the terrace houses in Ephesus

Signs of cracking and disintegration of paint layers and the formation of paint blisters is indicative of physical/structural degradation. Industrial pollutants contain gases and burning fossil fuels which react with oxygen and water to produce sulfuric acid and nitric acids. These acids convert calcium carbonate (limestone) to calcium sulfate which becomes soluble in the water and it forms large crystals within the surface layer causing the fresco to blister and flake off. Aside from the adverse effects of environmental pollutants, fungal growth either on or below the surface can cause the dislodging of the paint layers further contributing to the physical and structural degradation of frescoes.

== Preventive care ==
Frescoes that have been removed from their original context and relocated to cultural institutions have the benefit of being in a more stable environment that is consistently monitored, even though they are at low risk. However, for frescoes still at their place of origin, such as cultural heritage sites, are at high risk because they are vulnerable to environmental elements due to a high volume of tourist traffic in conjunction with other pollutants. Therefore, as with any similar object, data loggers are useful to monitor ambient conditions such as temperature and relative humidity, as well as thermohygrometric sensors for micro-climate monitoring for fresco paintings in indoor, outdoor or semi-confined environments.

== Cleaning methods ==
Cleaning aims to restore artworks to how the artist intended them to look; however, how an artwork is cleaned will depend on the nature of the material to be removed. With paintings, a variety of organic solvents are used, but the most common solvent is water, often with chelating agents, surfactants or salts to control pH. Applying solutions through tissues, gels and sponges is becoming the norm, due to the level of control offered by holding the cleaning system at the upper surface of the art. Such gels, introduced in the late 1980s, are usually water-based emulsions thickened with cellulose or synthetic polymers. By slowly releasing the solvent, they prevent some of the swelling damage that free solvents cause to paint layers. During the 1960s, it became popular to use synthetic polymers to consolidate and stabilise frescoes – plaster-based wall paintings. They seemed like the perfect replacement for the wax coatings previously used, but over time it became clear that this was not the case. Their presence drastically changed the paintings' surface properties, causing mechanical stresses and crystallisation of salts beneath the painting leading to accelerated disintegration. In addition, the polymers themselves became discoloured and brittle. By the mid-1990s, laser cleaning was established for stone and started to be used for other materials such as gilded bronzes and frescoes. A major breakthrough came when an Italian physicist at the National Research Council Institute of Applied Physics in Florence, Salvatore Siano, developed a method that used even shorter pulses, of only micro- to nanosecond duration. Another major innovation in the last decade is the use of colloid science and nanotechnology in conservation. In the mid-1990s colloid scientist Piero Baglioni came up with a microemulsion: a clear mixture of organic solvent and water, stabilised with a surfactant that sits at the interface between the water and organic phases. Another unusual method of cleaning frescoes is with the use of specific types of bacteria to remove inorganic crusts and animal glues from frescoes. Because bacteria can produce a whole host of enzymes they can deal with complex cleaning problems, metabolising organic and inorganic matter into hydrogen sulfide, molecular nitrogen or carbon dioxide.

== Repair and restoration techniques ==
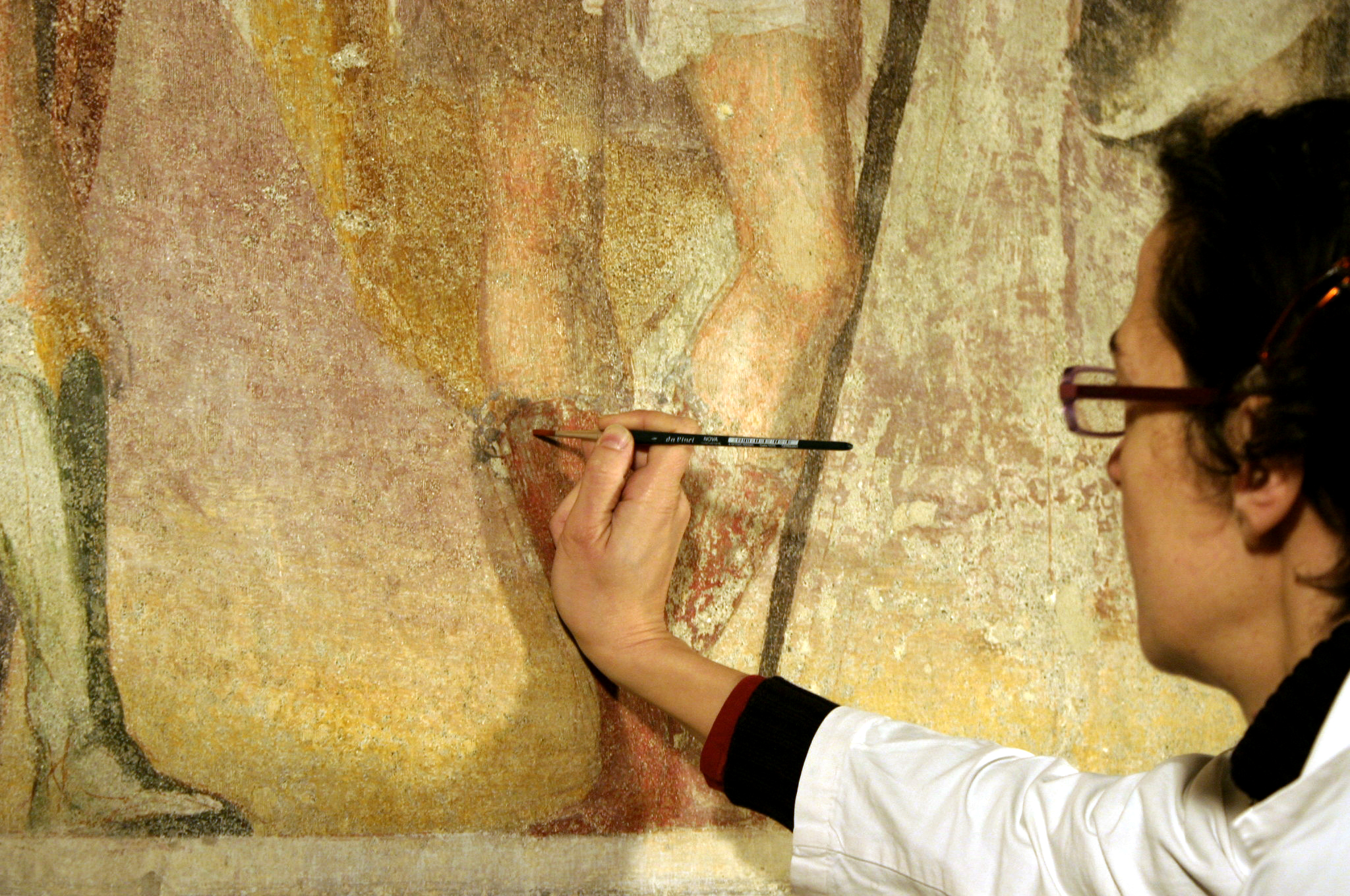
MI - Sant'Eustorgio - Sottocoro - Restauratrice - Foto Giovanni Dall'Orto - 1-Mar-2007

During the 18th century, new techniques were perfected for the restoration and conservation of ancient works of art, including methods of detaching fresco paintings from walls. Detachment involves separating the layer of paint from its natural backing, generally stone or brick, and can be categorized according to the removal technique used.

The oldest method, known as the a massello technique, involves cutting the wall and removing a considerable part of it together with both layers of plaster and the fresco painting itself.

The stacco technique, on the other hand, involves removing only the preparatory layer of plaster, called the arriccio together with the painted surface.

Finally, the strappo technique, without doubt the least invasive, involves removing only the topmost layer of plaster, known as the intonachino, which has absorbed the pigments, without touching the underlying arriccio layer. In this method, a protective covering made from strips of cotton and animal glue is applied to the painted surface. A second, much heavier cloth, larger than the painted area, is then laid on top and a deep incision is made in the wall around the edges of the fresco. A rubber mallet is used to repeatedly strike the fresco so that it detaches from the wall. Using a removal tool, a sort of awl, the painting and the intonachino attached to the cloth and glue covering are then detached, from the bottom up.

The back of the fresco is thinned to remove excess lime and reconstructed with a permanent backing made from two thin cotton cloths, called velatini, and a heavier cloth with a layer of glue. Two layers of mortar are then applied; first a rough one and then a smoother, more compact layer.

The mortars make up the first real layer of the new backing. The velatini cloths and the heavier cloth serve only to facilitate future detachments, and are therefore known as the strato di sacrificio, or sacrificial layer. Once the mortar is dry, a layer of adhesive is applied and the fresco is attached to a rigid support made from synthetic material which can be used to reconstruct the architecture that originally housed the fresco. After the backing has completely dried, the cloth covering used to protect the front of the fresco during detachment is removed using a hot water spray and decoloured ethyl alcohol.

Piero Baglioni has also pioneered the use of nanoparticles for repairing deteriorating frescoes. Artists generally painted directly onto wet calcium hydroxide plaster, which reacts with atmospheric carbon dioxide to form calcium carbonate (calcite). Over centuries, pollution and humidity causes the carbonate layer to break down and sulfate, nitrate and chloride salts within the walls recrystallize, leading to deterioration of the painted surface. Baglioni was sure that nanoparticles would improve on conventional conservation methods. His treatment injects calcium hydroxide nanoparticles dispersed in alcohol and their small size, just 10–100 nm, allows them to penetrate several centimetres into the frescoes and slowly reform the depleted calcite.

Antibiotics such as amoxicillin can be used to treat strains of bacteria living in a fresco's natural pigment which can turn them into powder.

Another method of fresco repair is the application of a protection and support bandage of cotton gauze and polyvinyl alcohol. Difficult sections are removed with soft brushes and localized vacuuming. The other areas that are easier to remove (because they had been damaged by less water) are removed with a paper pulp compress saturated with bicarbonate of ammonia solutions and removed with deionized water. These sections are strengthened and reattached then cleansed with base exchange resin compresses, and the wall and pictorial layer are strengthened with barium hydrate. The cracks and detachments are stopped with lime putty and injected with an epoxy resin loaded with micronized silica.

== Fresco restoration projects ==
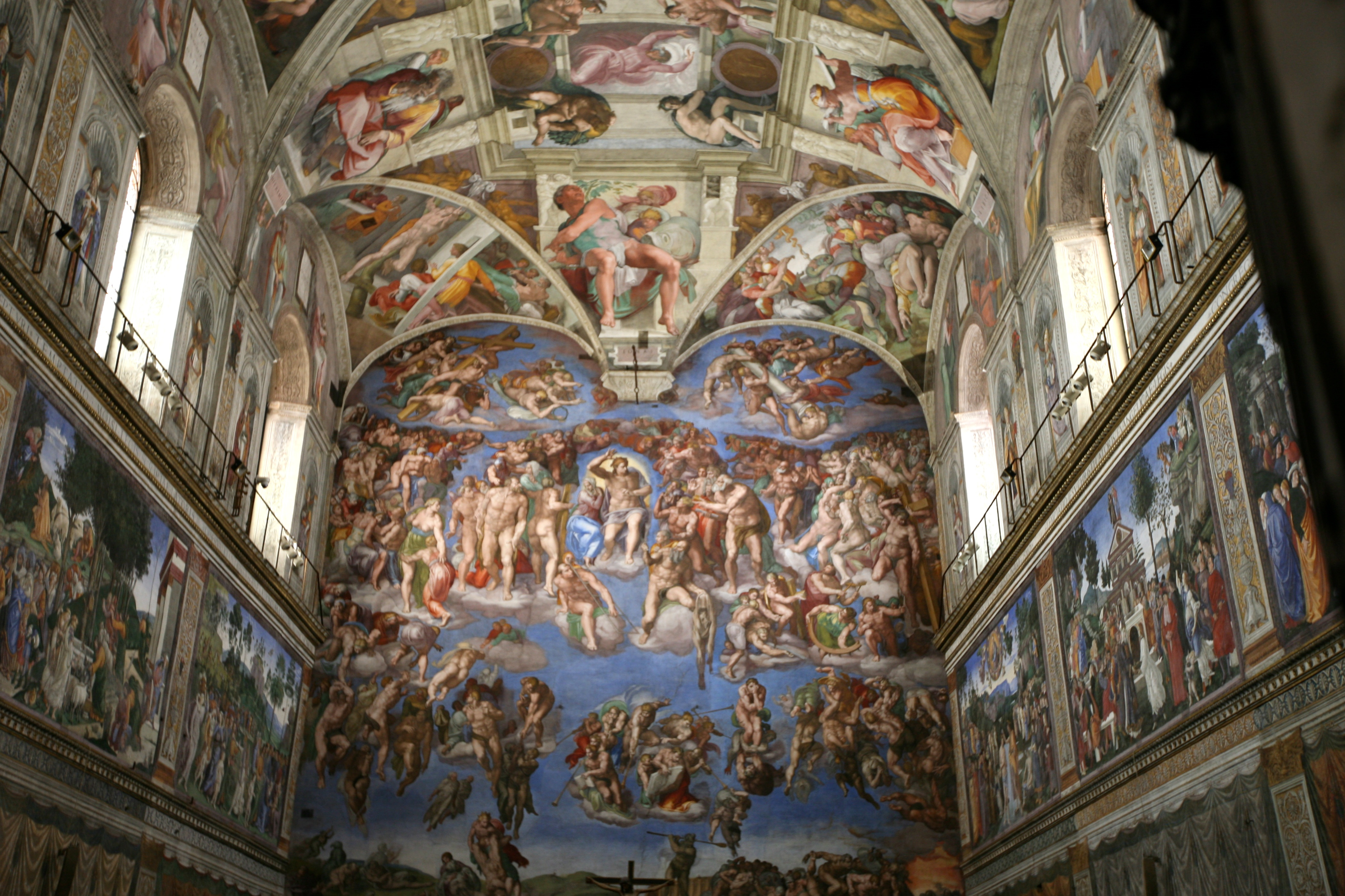
The Sistine Chapel

=== Sistine Chapel ===
The Sistine Chapel was restored in the late 1970s and through the 1980s. This was one of the most significant, largest and longest art restoration projects in history. The entire project took twelve years to complete, not taking into account the inspections, planning and approval of the project. Among the many parts of the chapel that was restored, what drew the most attention were Michelangelo's frescoes. The restoration sparked controversy. A number of experts criticized the proposed techniques, claiming that the restoration procedure would scrape off the layers of various materials on the frescoes, which would lead to damage beyond repair, and that the removal of the materials would expose the pigments on the frescoes which were fragile and dated to artificial light, temperature variations, humidity and pollution. Such exposure, they feared, would cause massive damage to the original artwork.

=== Villa of Mysteries in Pompeii ===
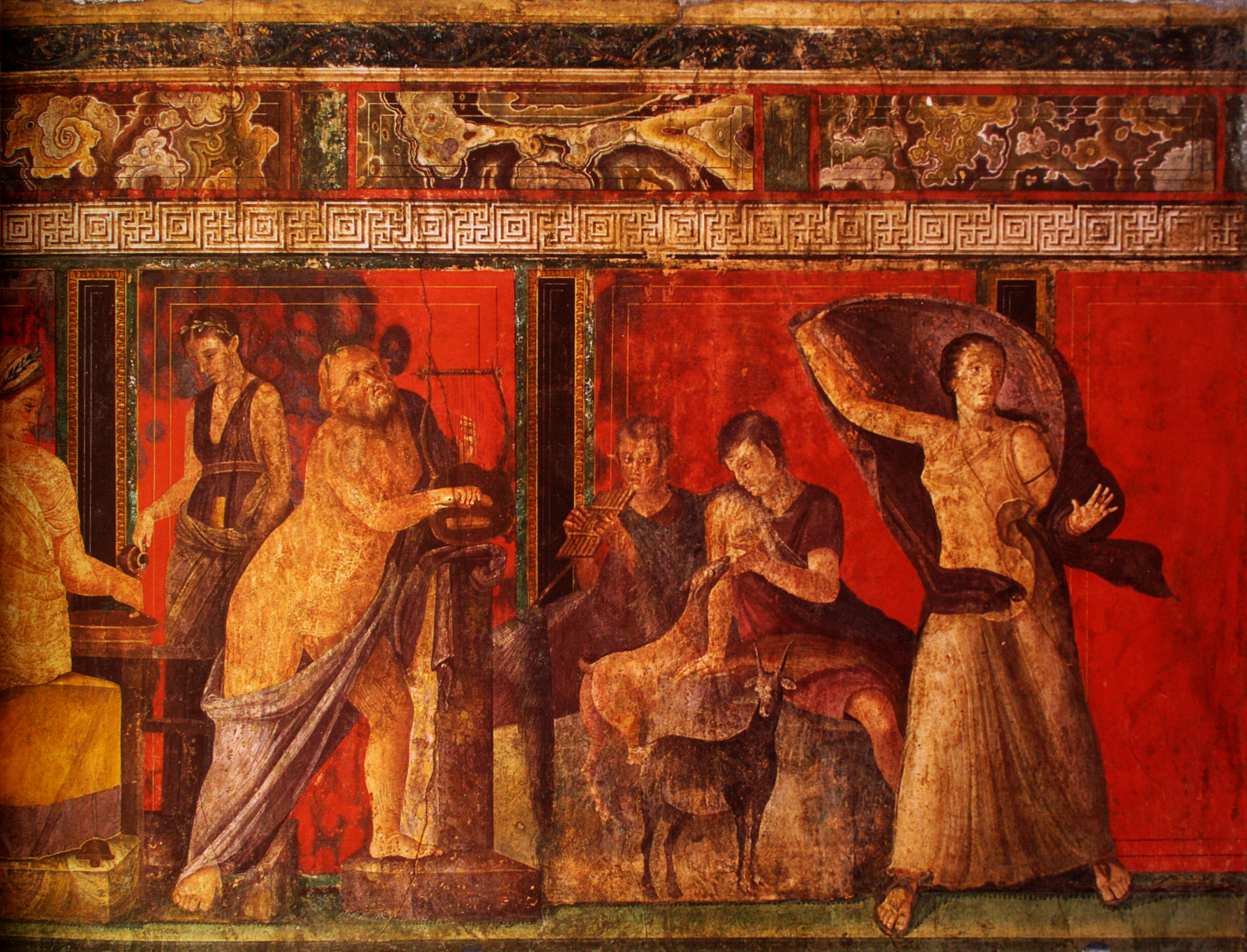
Fresque des mytères, Pompéi

For the frescos of Villa of the Mysteries in Pompeii, early conservation efforts sometimes involved removing frescoes, rebuilding or reinforcing the walls, and then reattaching the paintings. The first conservators also applied a coat of wax mixed with oil to clean the paintings' surfaces, preserve the ancient pigments, and stabilize the fragile works, giving the frescoes a glossy appearance the ancient artists never intended them to have. At the same time, the wax filled in cracks in the surfaces, sealing moisture inside the walls, further weakening them by compromising the strength of the mortar holding the walls together. By 2013 the villa, like most of Pompeii, was in dire need of modern conservation, as was a protective covering that had been constructed in different phases throughout the years. Parts of paintings were crumbling from unstable walls and the mosaics had been severely damaged by millions of visitors' feet. Repeated applications of wax had caused the pigments to oxidize and darken, and the frescoes to yellow, significantly altering their appearance. All the surface decorations of the villa, both mosaics and frescoes, had been conserved before, but in irregular ways. Some of the methods currently being employed have been used by decades of conservators at Pompeii. Frescoes have been cleaned by hand using a scalpel or a chemical solution. Painted surfaces have been consolidated with an acrylic resin diluted with deionized water and then injected into cracks, as well as the use of antibiotics for the removal of bacteria.

The teams today also have more high-tech tools at their disposal, including lasers to clean the frescoes, and ultrasound, thermal imaging, and radar to evaluate the level of decay of the walls and paintings. Drones are being used to examine the entirety of the villa's protective covering.
