= House of Thiasus =

Religious site in Pompeii

- Casa del Tiaso
- Interactive map of the House of Thiasus area

General information
- Location: Pompeii, Region IX, Insula 10 (I.10), Italy
- Coordinates: 40°45′08″N 14°29′20″E

The House of Thiasus (Italian: Casa del Tiaso) is a house in Pompeii that was buried by the eruption of Mount Vesuvius in 79 AD. It is located on Via Nola in insula 10 of Regio IX.

According to inscriptions found in the house, it was most likely owned by Aulus Rustius Verus, who was an important figure and duumvir, or a client of his. Excavations began in 1888 but then stopped and were resumed in 2023 as part of the Great Pompeii Project to solve drainage and damage problems on the edges of excavated areas.

In February 2025, a room was discovered with large colourful frescoes dating to 40–30 BC and depicting scenes of the Dionysian Thiasus, hence the name of the house.

Five skeletons have been found in the house, some of whom were killed by walls and roofs collapsing due to the weight of eruption material.

At the time of the eruption, much of the house was being renovated or rebuilt, as shown by the large piles of roof tiles, stone, mortar materials and tools found throughout the house. Nevertheless, the house was still occupied, as shown by the last sacrifice at the domestic altar and the human remains.

== Description ==
Over 50 rooms over an area of at least 1500 m^{2} have been discovered. Other large areas await exploration.

Two atrium houses along the Via Nola dating from the Samnite period as early as the 3rd century BC were transformed, probably after the earthquake of 62 AD, into a complex with a laundry in the atrium of one house, while a bakery with an oven and production rooms with millstones was installed in the other house for wholesale distribution of bread to other outlets in the city. Slaves and donkeys were used there to grind the grain for the bread and kept in dark rooms with small barred windows high in the wall.

Two bedrooms adjoining the atrium of house 1 have frescoes depicting Poseidon and Amymone in the first and Apollo and Daphne in the second. In one of these rooms are remains of charred furniture which caught fire during the catastrophe.

Behind the commercial parts facing the Via Nola was the main residential section in which were many luxurious rooms with outstanding frescoes. These include the black-painted reception or dining room with white mosaic floor and frescoes of the Trojan War, the large porticoed room with Dionysiac scenes, a sacrarium (shrine) and a large bath complex complete with palaestra for exercise and a plunge pool. The boiler room has a unique arrangement of pipework and valves for the water supply. An exquisite ceiling fresco was found collapsed on the floor.

The two skeletons found sheltering from the eruption in a small room in this part of the house were of a rich woman with gold and pearl earrings and clutching gold coins while a younger man, possibly a slave, was nearby crushed by a collapsed wall.

=== Room of the Dionysian Thiasus ===
The fresco occupies three walls of the room while the fourth opens onto the garden. The fresco, like the famous one in the Villa of Mysteries, is one of the few that depict the mysteries of the Dionysian cult. It depicts lifesize figures standing on pedestals as if they were statues although their movement, complexions and dress make them appear lively.

One of the details of the large fresco, according to the initial hypotheses, depicts a woman initiated into the Dionysian cult.

=== The Lararium ===
Southwest of the atrium of house 1 in Room 12 is a large lararium or household shrine built against the south wall. It consists of two bands: the upper one decorated with two large snakes in stucco; the lower one a fresco dominated by a large snake next to an attached altar. The decorations date to the decade preceding the eruption, proved by the last layer of plaster covering an earlier one on which are numerous electoral graffiti for the office of aedile which Aulus Rustius Verus would have held up to a decade earlier.

The room was undergoing reconstruction as shown by mixing areas for mortar on the beaten floor and by piles of rough-hewn building aggregates and ceramic containers full of fresh lime.

The altar still contained recent burnt offerings of figs, dates, olives, pine cone bracts, shells and pine nuts.

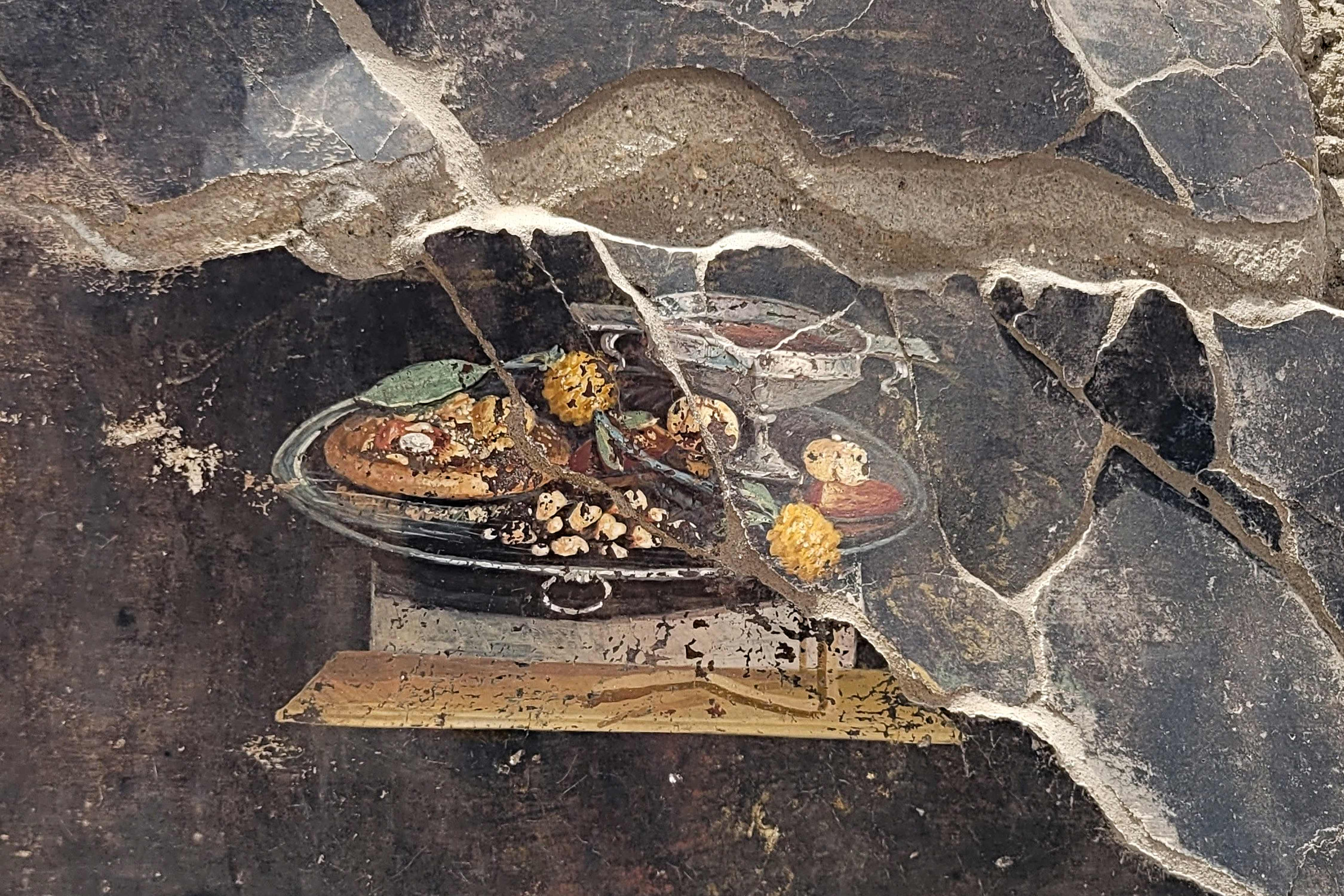
Fresco in the hallway depicting a goblet of wine and various fruits, including a pomegranate and date. The pizza-like bread appears to have moretum, a cheese spread with herbs popular in ancient Rome. The fresco is likely to be inspired by the Greek hospitality ritual of xenia and shows gifts typically offered to guests

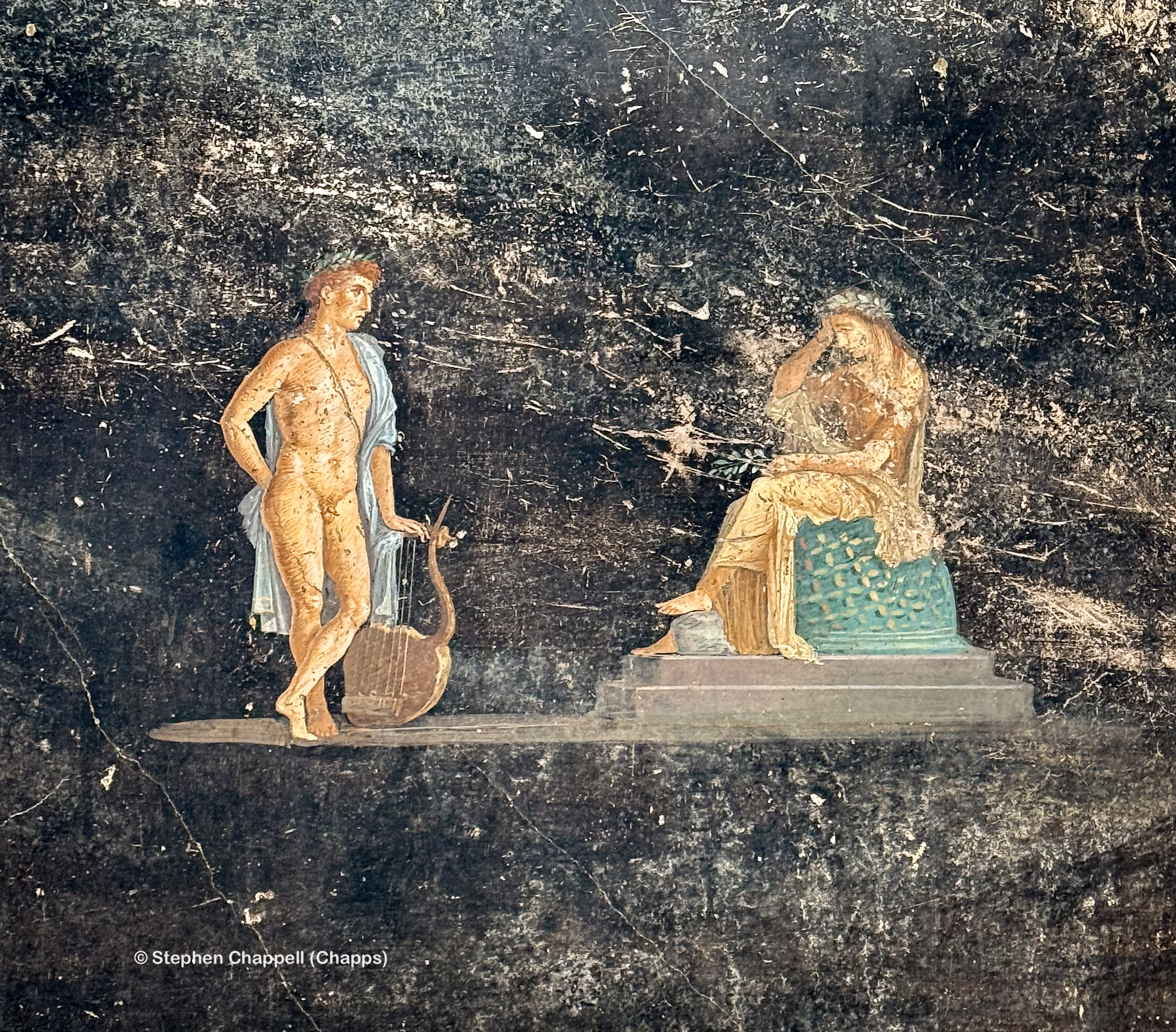
Fresco from the Black Room depicting an angered Apollo and regretful Cassandra

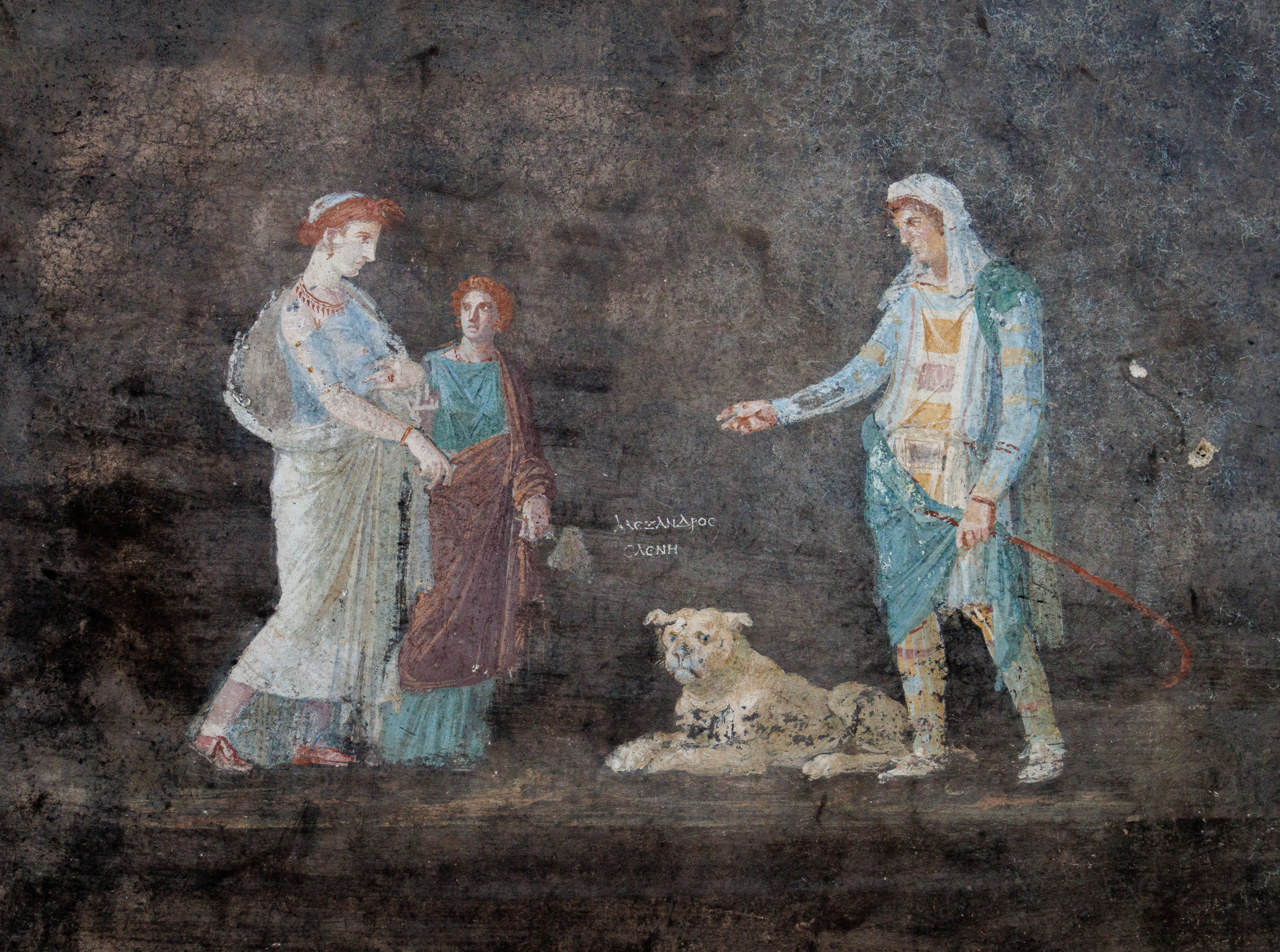
From the Black Room: fresco of the meeting of Helen and Paris
