= Villa of the Mysteries =

Building in Pompeii, Italy

Coordinates: 40°45′13.3″N 14°28′38.8″E

- Villa dei Misteri (Italian)
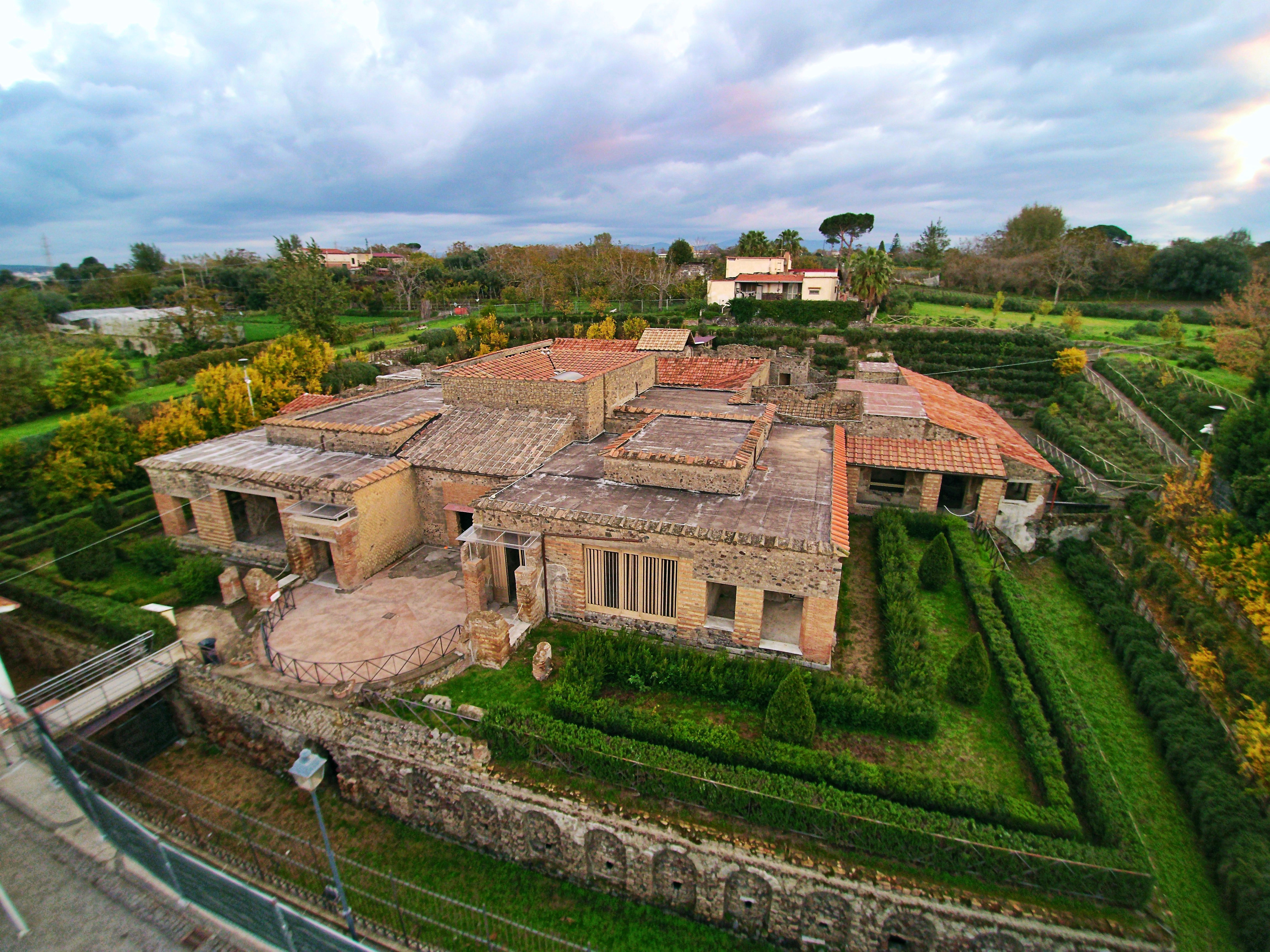
- Villa of the Mysteries seen from above

- Location in Italy
- Interactive map of Villa of the Mysteries
- Type: Roman villa
- Periods: Roman Republic, Roman Empire
- Location: Pompeii, Italy
- Region: Campania

History
- Built: 2nd century BC
- Abandoned: 79 AD
- Event: Eruption of Mount Vesuvius

Site notes
- Excavation dates: 1909-1910, 1929-1930
- Archaeologists: Aurelio Item, Giuseppe Spano, Amadeo Maiuri
- Discovered: 1909
- Condition: Well-preserved
- Owner: Public
- Management: Soprintendenza Pompei
- Public access: Yes

The Villa of the Mysteries (Italian: Villa dei Misteri) is a well-preserved suburban ancient Roman villa on the outskirts of Pompeii, southern Italy. It is famous for the series of exquisite frescos in Room 5, which are usually interpreted as showing the initiation of a bride into a Greco-Roman mystery cult. These are now among the best known of the relatively rare survivals of Ancient Roman painting from the 1st century BC.

Like the rest of the Roman city of Pompeii, the villa was buried in the eruption of Mount Vesuvius in 79 AD. It was excavated from 1909 onwards. It is now a popular part of tourist visits to Pompeii and forms part of the UNESCO World Heritage Site at Pompeii. The Villa of the Mysteries has also been featured in music and media— inspiring Corde Oblique's song "Slide" and serving as a setting in the novel Queen of the Damned by Anne Rice.

Location (top left) outside Pompeii

== Location ==
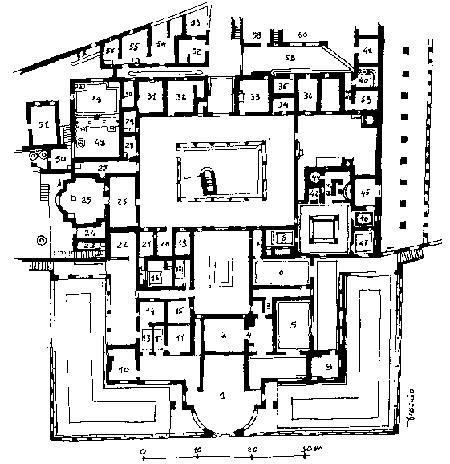
Plan of the villa

The villa is located some 400 m northwest of the town walls, between the roads Via Delle Tombe and Via Superiore lined with funerary monuments leading to the Herculaneum Gate of Pompeii, and is near the Villa of Diomedes and the so-called Villa of Cicero. It lies on a hill with an expansive view of the current Gulf of Naples; it rests on a slope and is partly supported by a cryptoporticus formed by blind arches.

== History ==
The villa was built in the 2nd century BC and reached its period of maximum splendor during the Augustan age when it was considerably enlarged and embellished. Recent research, however, has posited that the villa was built in the early 1st century BC around the time of Sulla. This analysis is based on stratigraphic evidence and the dating of the Second Style frescoes, which are the earliest decoration in the villa stylistically dating to the early 1st century BC. After construction, it was then a villa urbana, which is a type of suburban villa, with large rooms and hanging gardens, in a panoramic position. Following the earthquake of 62 AD, it fell into disrepair, as did much of the city, and was transformed into a villa rustica with the addition of agricultural equipment such as a wine press. The building was then mainly used for the production and sale of wine.

The ownership of the Villa is unknown, as is the case with many private homes in Pompeii. A bronze seal was found in the villa that names L. Istacidius Zosimus, a freedman of the powerful Istacidii family, who was either the owner of the Villa or the overseer of its reconstruction after the earthquake of 62 AD. The presence of a statue of Livia, wife of Augustus, has led some historians to suggest that she was a previous owner. The remains of a bronze-trimmed saddled horse help some scholars to suggest a high-ranking official, possibly military, occupied the villa at the time of its demise.

== Discovery and excavation ==
The villa, initially called Villa Item, named after its discoverer, Aurelio Item, was uncovered between 1909 and 1910 in an excavation conducted by Giuseppe Spano; a more in-depth investigation was carried out between 1929 and 1930 by Amadeo Maiuri, following the expropriation imposed by the Italian State. From 2013 to 2015, important restoration and conservation work on the frescoes and floor mosaics took place. In 2017, illegal tunnels around the walls of the villa that had been used to steal artifacts were found. This sparked the 2018 excavation of the stables on the villa's ground, where archaeologists discovered the unique remains of harnessed horses.

== Description ==
Although covered with meters of pumice and ash, the Villa sustained only minor damage during the eruption of Mount Vesuvius in 79 AD. Most of its walls, ceilings, and particularly its frescoes survived largely intact.

In total, the villa has more than 60 rooms. The ancient entrance, which is located directly opposite the modern entrance, had benches for waiting clients and led to service rooms, including a courtyard for storing and unloading produce, servants' quarters, and rooms for agricultural equipment. A wine press discovered during excavations has been restored to its original location. This was not uncommon, as homes of the very wealthy often included areas for the production of wine, olive oil, or other agricultural products.

Past the entrance is the peristyle, the bathing and kitchen quarters, and the main atrium with an impluvium which leads into a triclinium with access to a portico with a view of the Gulf of Naples. Beyond the kitchen's courtyard sits a pre-Roman bathhouse that later became storage. Room 5, which is decorated with the famous frescoes for which the villa is named, lies to the right of Room 4, which is a cubiculum often identified as a "nuptial chamber."

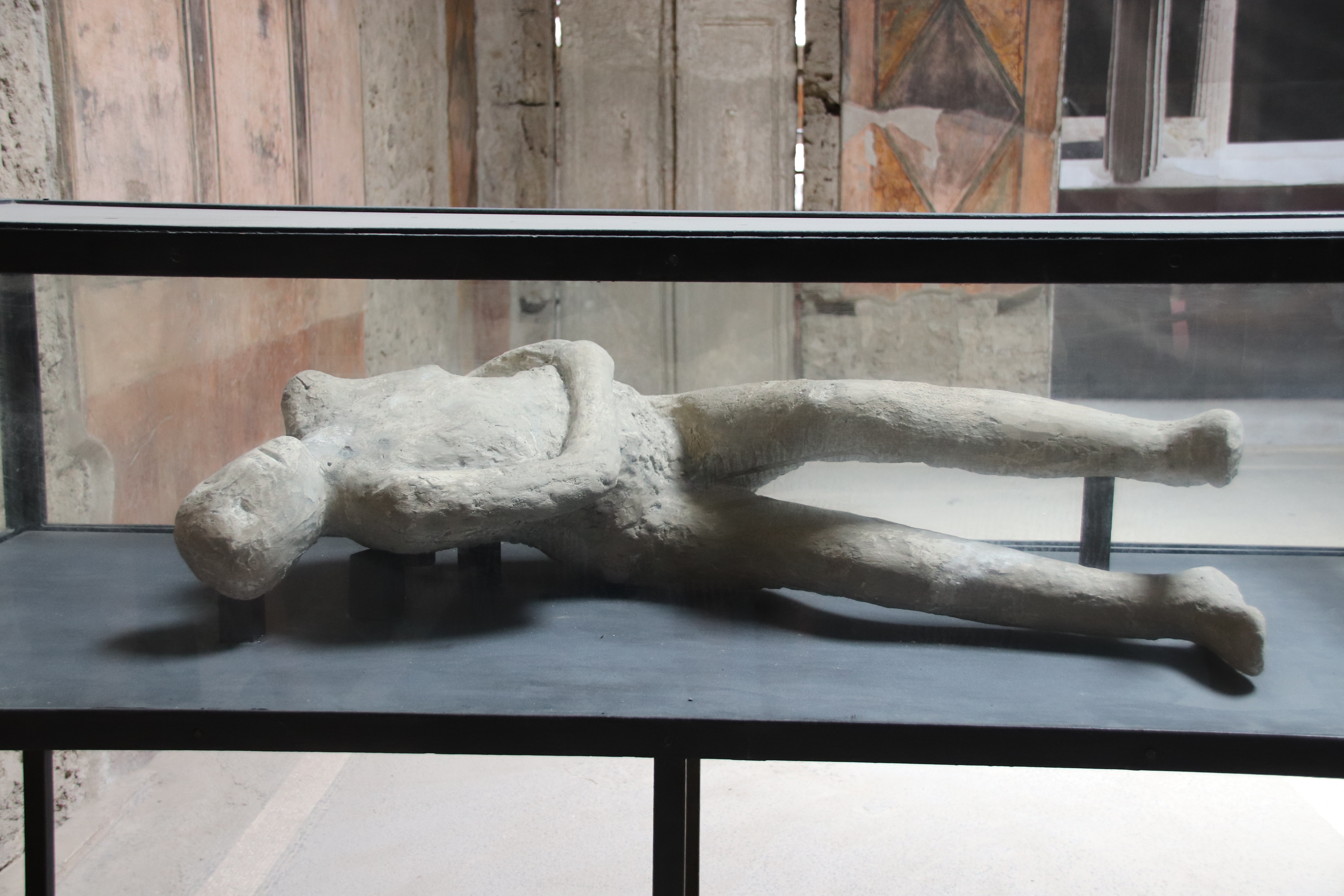
Cast of girl found at the entrance to the Villa

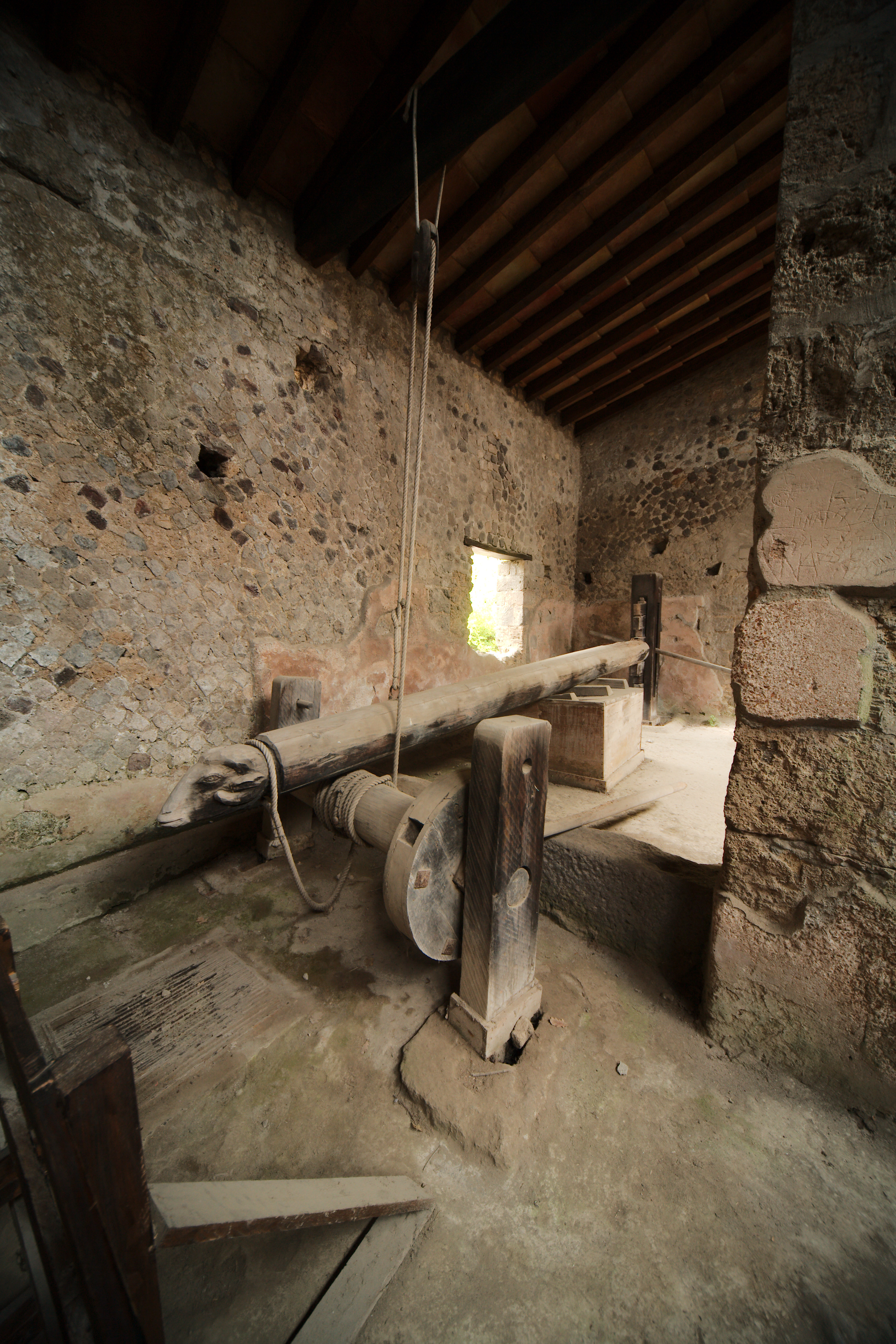
Wine press at the Villa of Mysteries

Though often believed to be a triclinium, Room 5 could have been a cubiculum or, as Brenda Longfellow posits, even multifunctional and used by various family members at different times of day or on different days. Because the exact use of the room is uncertain, it is also often referred to as an oecus, but it cannot securely be characterized as such. Room 5 is located at the back of the villa off of a peristyle with only one entrance and exit, making it one of the least accessible rooms in the villa to visitors. Because of its rich decoration and relative inaccessibility, it is thought to have been used on special occasions for invited guests.

The bodies of two women and a child were found in lower pumice eruption layers of the Villa, suggesting that they were caught in the early stages of the eruption of Mount Vesuvius. They were on the upper floor of the farm section and plaster casts were made of them as in other areas of Pompeii and Herculaneum. Six bodies (one girl near the entrance, one woman, four others in the cryptoporticus) were found in the later higher pyroclastic eruption layers indicating they had survived the first part of the catastrophe.

== Frescoes ==
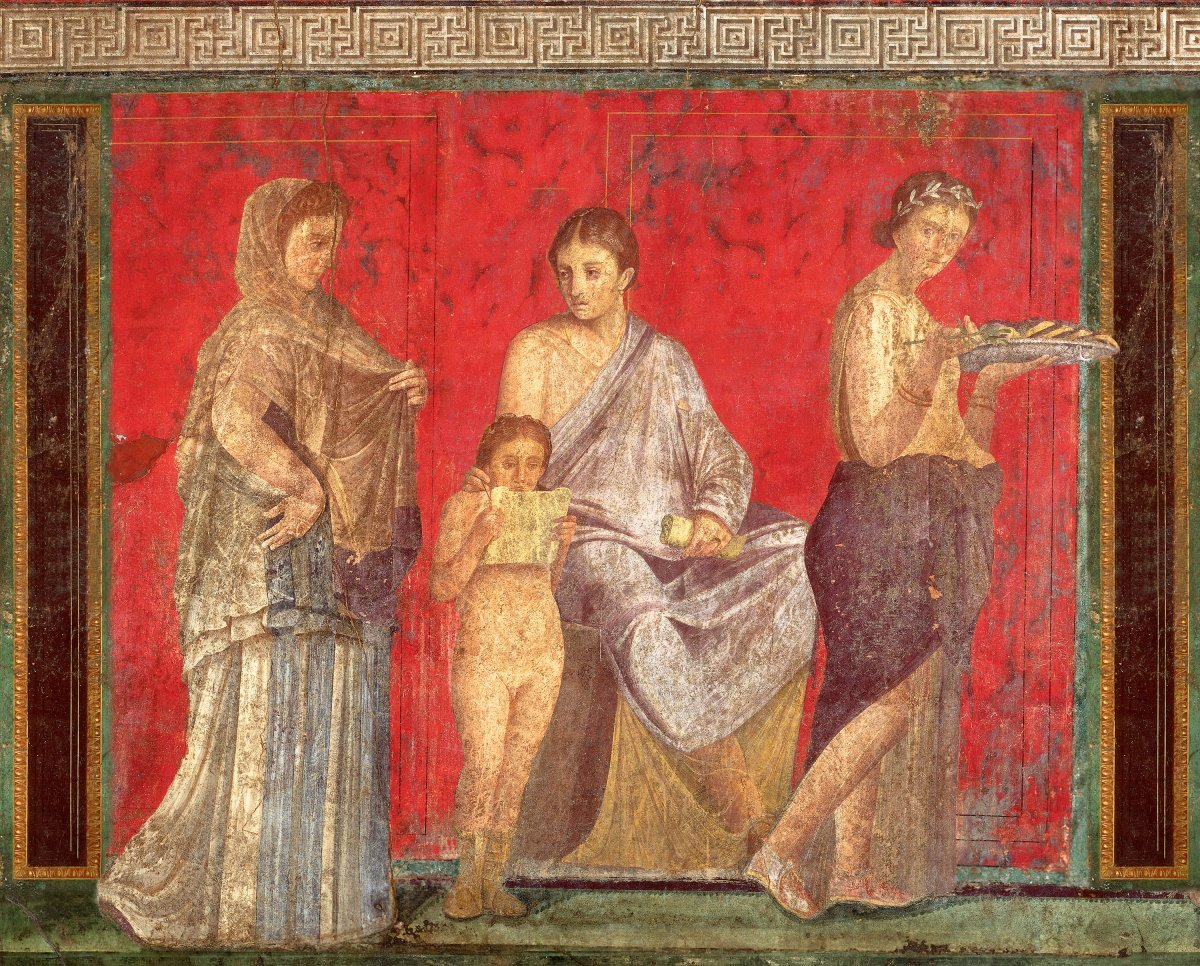
The first fresco depicting the reading of the rituals of the bridal mysteries

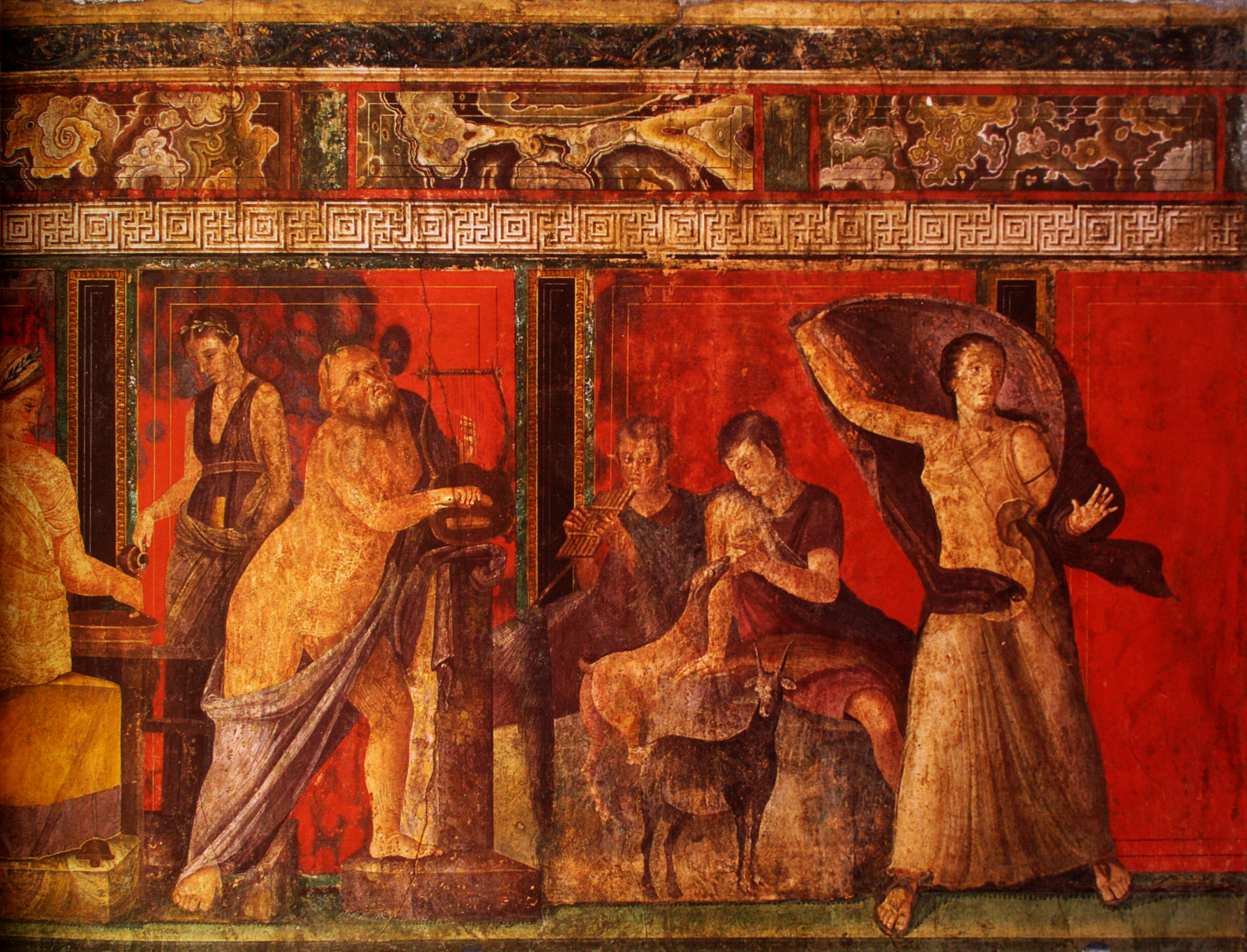
The third fresco of the triclinium, interpreted to represent the stages of initiation to the cult

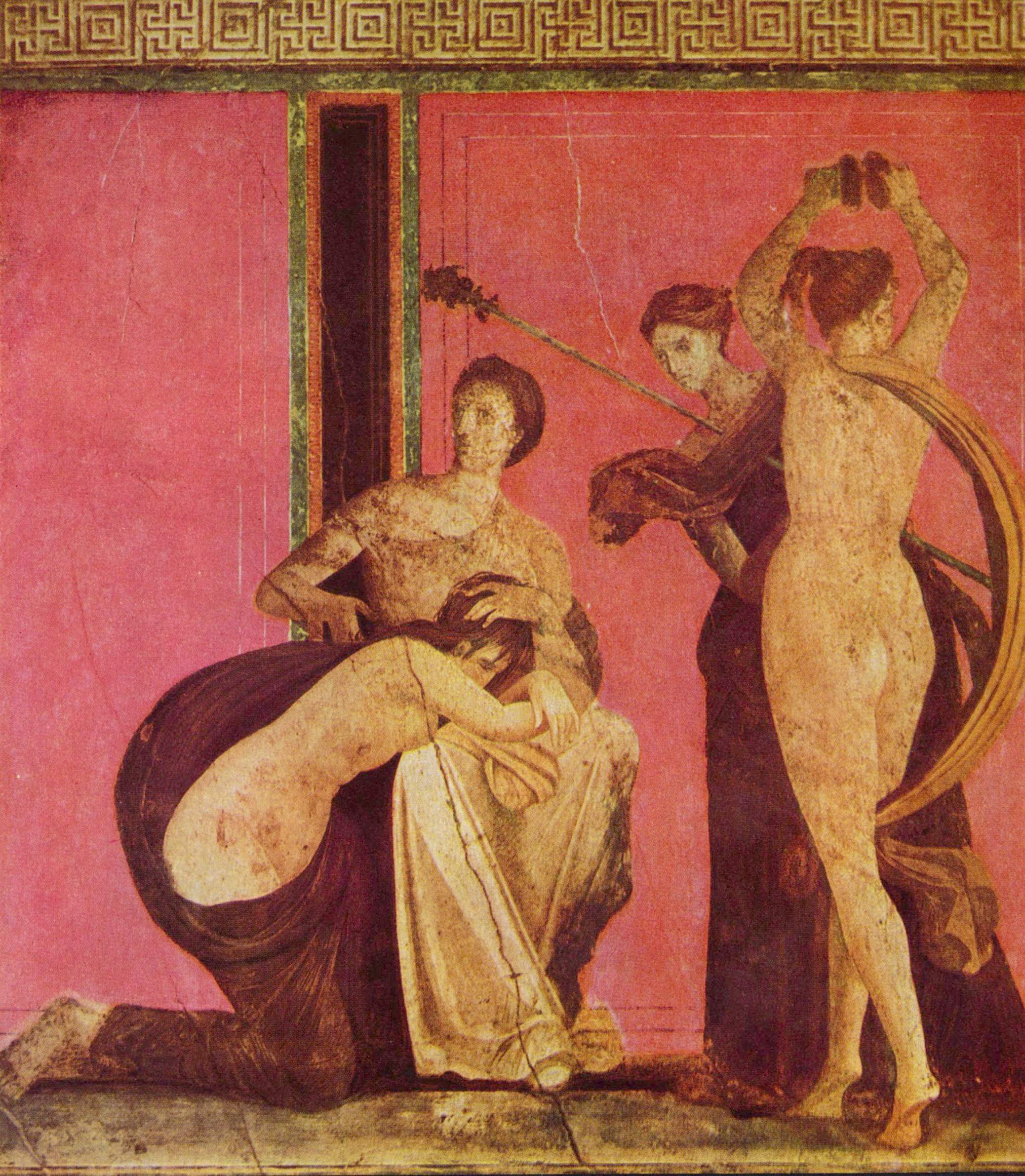
The fifth fresco depicting a Bacchic rite

External videos
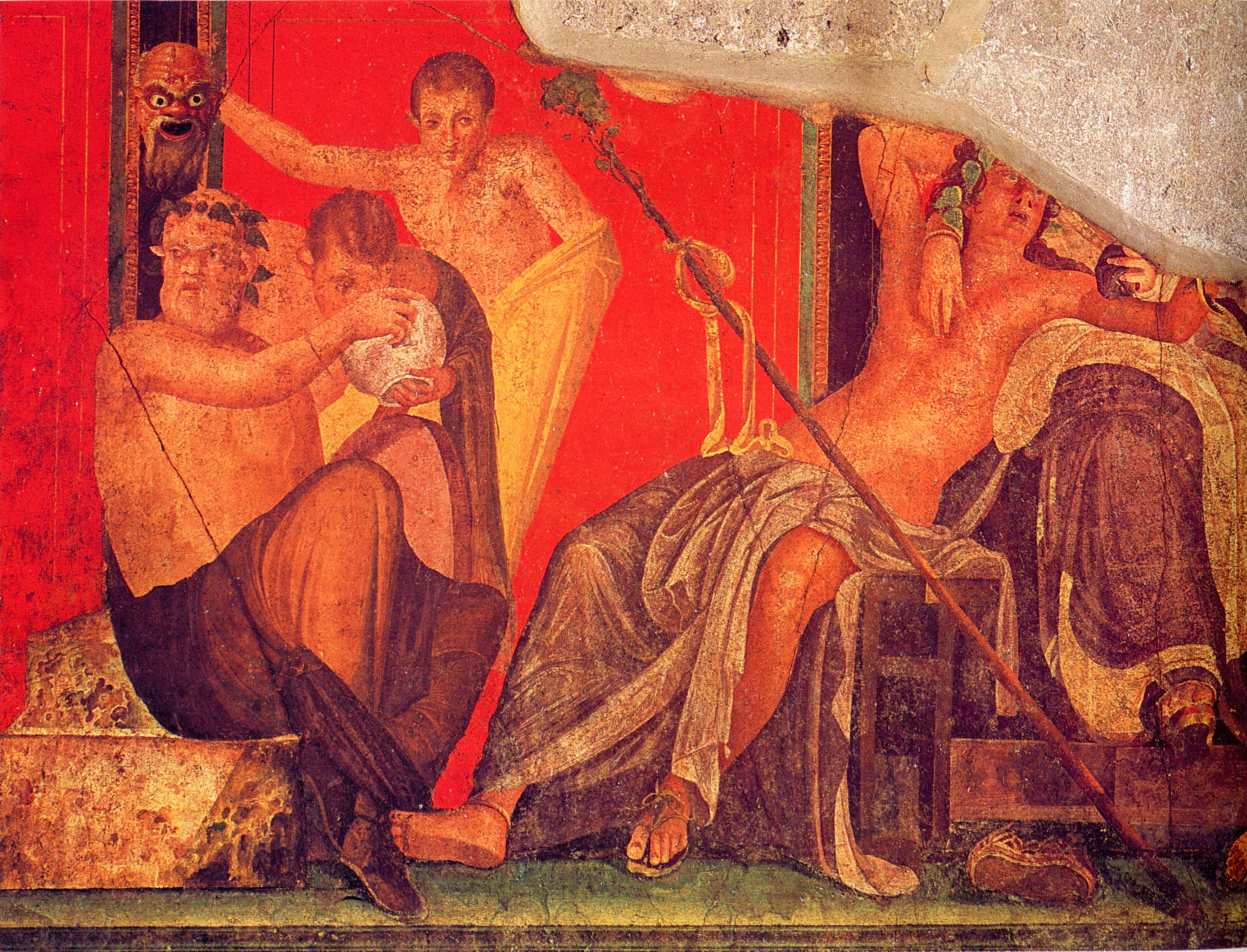
- Dionysiac frieze, Villa of Mysteries, Pompeii, Smarthistory

The villa is named for the paintings Room 5, which are true frescoes in the Second Style and dated to about 70-60 BC. Although the actual subject of the frescoes is debated, the most common interpretation is that they depict the initiation of a woman into matrimony in accordance with the Dionysian Mysteries, a mystery cult devoted to the god known to the Romans as Bacchus. Specific rites were required to become a member. A key feature that helps to identify these scenes as Bacchic is the depiction of maenads, the deity's female followers. These devotees are often shown dancing with swirling drapery on painted Greek pottery from the sixth century BC onward. There are many different interpretations of the frescoes, but they are commonly believed to depict a religious rite in some form. A common theory is that the frescoes depict a bride initiating into the Bacchic Mysteries in preparation for marriage. In this hypothesis, the elaborate costume worn by the main figure is believed to be wedding apparel.

=== Restorations ===
The famous frescoes of the villa were first discovered in 1909, but they were soon damaged by a combination of poor protection from the elements and an earthquake that occurred in June. Salt residue from the ground caused white stains to appear on the surface of the paintings, and the pigments began to fade in the sun. To counteract this, large sections of the frescoes were removed and re-attached after the walls were rebuilt with new stone to better resist the damp and salt leaching.

According to the preservation methods prevalent at the time, coatings of wax and petroleum were applied to remove the residues and provide protection, which accounts for the glossy sheen which was characteristic of the frescoes in the 20th/early 21st centuries. These coatings proved remarkably effective in protecting the paintings from further damage, but distorted the original colouring, making the red background appear darker than the original pigment. Later in 1909, a German team of archaeologists undertook further restorations onsite.

Between 2013 and 2015, restorations were undertaken on the frescoes using modern techniques. Ultrasound technology, passive and active thermography, and electromagnetic devices were used to make images of the walls and study weak points in the frescoes. Laser technology was used to remove the layers of wax and petroleum applied in the early 20th century, allowing analysis and restoration of the original colour tones to be done. The frescoes were also treated with the antibiotic amoxicillin, which removed the manganese dioxide that had leached into the paintings from the ground, and the streptococci bacteria which feed on the pigments and cause deterioration.

=== Interpretation of the frescoes ===
Because of the subject matter and order of the frescoes, they are typically read as a single narrative. The scenes are typically understood to represent different moments in the initiation ritual into the Bacchic Mysteries. Women and satyrs are featured prominently, with the villa owner's family possibly acting as models for the women and children depicted in the frescoes. Given the widely accepted theory that the murals portray aspects of the cult of Bacchus, some propose that the frescoed room itself was used to conduct initiations and other rituals, although the exact use of this room is heavily debated. Molly Swetnam-Burland has argued against this interpretation of the room, stating that when compared to other depictions of Bacchus in religious contexts around Pompeii, the Bacchus in these frescoes is different in key aspects, demonstrating that this is not a religious space. Elaine K. Gazda argues that the restorations have made possible the identification of the women depicted in the frescoes, not as the same woman repeated throughout an initiation scene, but as portraits of different women with their own individualized features. She identifies the matron in the last mural as the domina of the villa, the bride in the sixth mural as her daughter, the Bacchus as the dominus, and the others as the men and women of the familia, such as relatives and enslaved people.

The first mural shows a noble Roman woman approaching a priestess or matron seated on a throne, by which stands a small boy reading a scroll – presumably the declaration of the initiation into the cult or singing a hymn. On the other side of the throne a young woman is shown in a purple robe and myrtle crown, holding a sprig of laurel and a tray of cakes. She appears to be a serving girl and may be bringing an offering to the god or goddess.

The second mural depicts another priestess (or senior initiate) and her assistants preparing the liknon basket. At one side a Silenus (a creature part man and part horse) is playing a lyre.

The third mural shows a satyr playing the panpipes and a nymph suckling a goat in an Arcadian scene. To their right is a figure some have identified as the goddess Aura. Others have identified her as the initiate or bride.

In the direction to which she stares in horror, the fourth mural shows a young satyr being offered a bowl of wine by Silenus, while behind him, another satyr holds up a frightening mask which the drinking satyr sees reflected in the bowl (this may parallel the mirror into which young Bacchus stares in the Orphic rites). Next to them sits a goddess, perhaps Ariadne or Semele, with Bacchus lying across her lap.

The fifth mural shows a woman carrying a staff and wearing a cap, items often presented after the successful completion of an initiation. She kneels before a priestess and appears to be whipped by a winged female figure. Next to her is a dancing figure (a Maenad or Thyiad) and a gowned figure with a thyrsus (an initiation symbol of Bacchus) made of long stalks of wrapped fennel, topped with a pine cone.

In the sixth mural a woman is dressed by an attendant, while a cupid holds a mirror (or portrait) up to her. This scene is often interpreted as a bride being readied before her marriage ceremony. To the right of the bride is another image of a cupid staring up at her. In the seventh mural, a matron is shown enthroned and in an elaborate costume.

== See also ==
- Roman architecture
- List of Roman domes
- Pompei Scavi-Villa dei Misteri railway station
- House of Thiasus
