= Great Pompeii Project =

Archaeological dig

The Great Pompeii Project (Grande Progetto Pompeii) was a 10-year programme of excavation and restoration at the archaeological site of Pompeii which started in 2012. Its discoveries included an inscription which indicated that the eruption which buried the city took place in October rather than August, as previously thought.
