= Cultural property exhibition =

Display of cultural heritage objects for educational or storytelling purposes

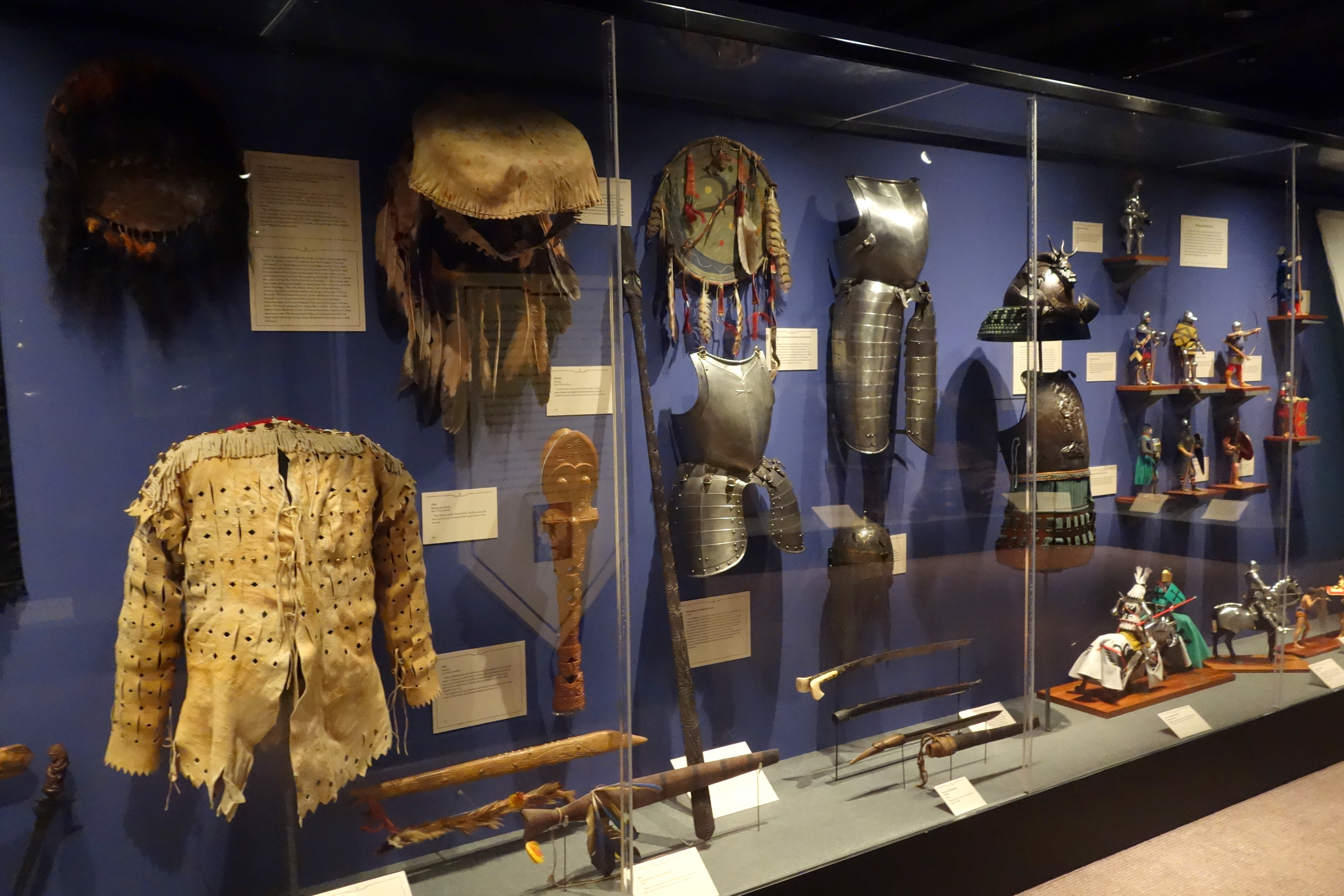
Exhibition display case

The exhibition of cultural property is a practice used by organizations where collected objects are put on display to the public. The objects are carefully chosen and placed together to offer educational value, and often to tell a story.

Organizations that collect cultural heritage objects, such as museums, tend to focus on the identification, display and interpretation of what they collect, preserve and study. These organizations many times will have a mandate to exhibit those objects to the public. The process that is undertaken when an object is chosen to be in an exhibition requires careful analysis of the needs of both the object and the exhibit design. Therefore, exhibitions have created a need for systems and procedures to be in place for processing the objects.

== Collections management policy ==
A collection management policy is a set of policies that address various aspects of collections management. This policy defines the scope of a museum's collection and how the organization cares for and makes collections available to the public. Access and use policies for objects in a collection will be explained in the policy. The documentation of object activity and monitoring will also be laid out in the policy. When an object is chosen for exhibition inclusion, the collection management policy will give clarity and guidance as to how to proceed. An exhibition policy may be included within a collection management policy, giving strategic planning guidelines that allow all participants in the exhibit-making process to know how it fits into the overall exhibit program and organization mission.

== Personnel ==
The formalized idea of a team of contributing members designing and developing museum exhibitions has been in practice since the late 1970s. Depending on the size and nature of the collecting organization, the number of people involved and what duties are assigned, the following responsibilities can vary significantly.

- Registrar – check availability of objects, prepare exhibition file which may include: tracking of objects, loan documents, condition assessments, conservation information, packing and shipping information
- Curator – may create exhibition concept, subject matter expert, object research
- Conservator/Restorer – inspect object, recommend appropriate mount, recommend environmental standards, prepare treatment proposal
- Exhibition designer – designs the space for an exhibition: graphic look and feel, labels, display cases, lighting
- Mount maker/Preparator – creation of mounts and display mechanisms for each object to be displayed

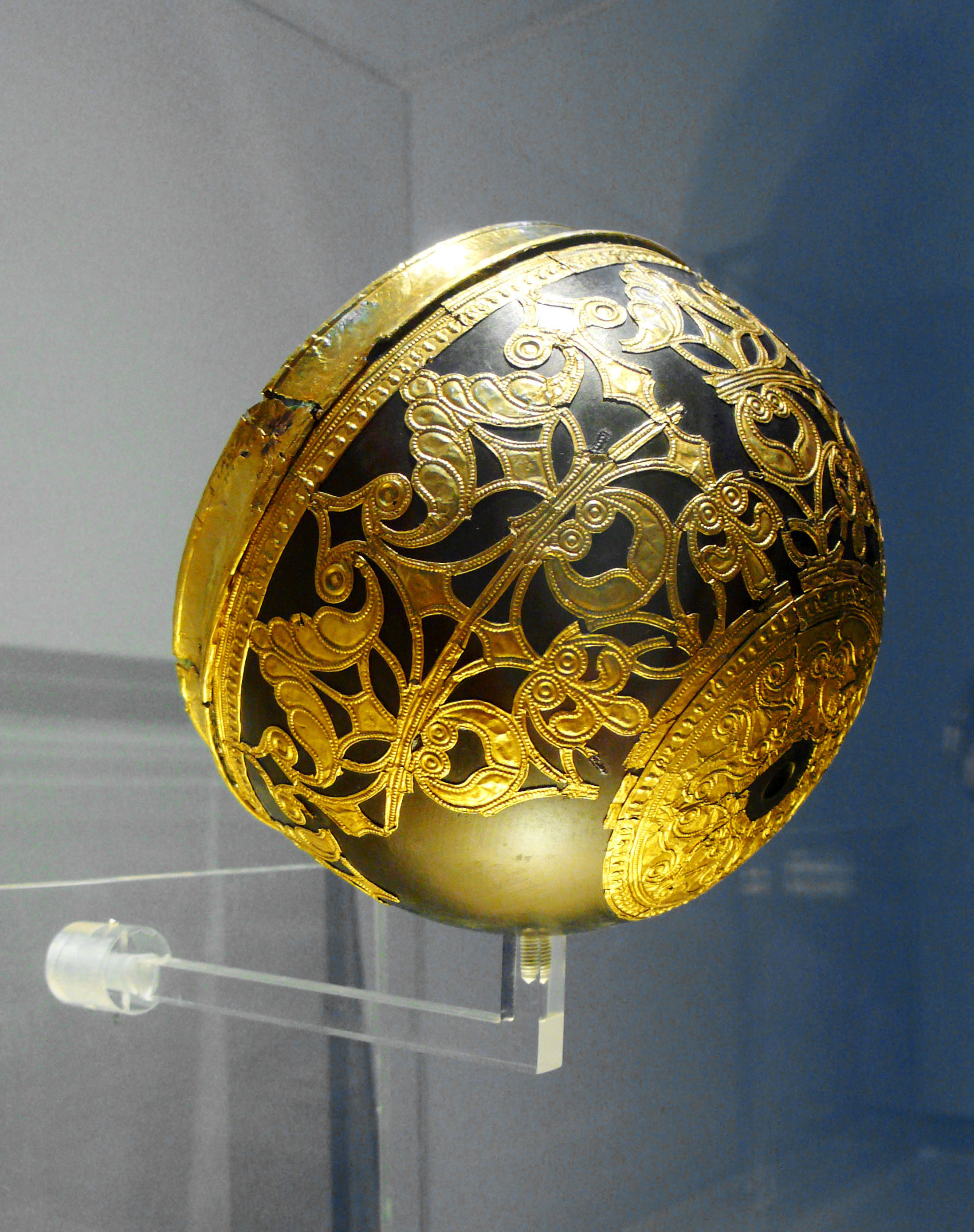
Unique mount for exhibit display

== Considerations ==
When an object is chosen for exhibit one must have an understanding of the nature of the material, its condition, and the types of deterioration to which the object is susceptible. Collections personnel and registrars work closely with developers and content specialists to select objects at a project's onset, and then work with production specialists for determining proper conditions for display, such as light levels, humidity concerns and mount making. The registrar will research the object's file for any condition history, and a current condition report will be done to make an assessment if the object is capable of withstanding display. Because of exhibition inclusion, the object may be handled, moved, exposed to direct lighting, and experience fluctuations in temperature and humidity. All of these factors are agents of deterioration, making the assessment of the object's condition prior to exhibit very important.

=== In-house exhibition or loan ===
The exhibition can take place in the same organization that houses the object, at another institution, or many locations as with a traveling exhibition. The process for in-house exhibitions begins in a similar fashion as a loan. An object list is decided upon and the status of each object must be researched for location and condition. The object's exhibit history is a factor worth consideration when understanding its condition. Recent display and exposure to light may require the object to rest in storage for a period before allowing it to be exhibited again. The preparation for a loan gets more extensive with insurance, loan contracts, couriers and considerations for travel. The object needs to be packed and crated with the object's specific requirements, such as thermal insulation, waterproofing, reusable closure systems, or travel frames. The size of an object's crate will need to be considered for entrance and exit into buildings. Exhibition loans have more variables that come into play than with in-house exhibitions, so consultation with a registrar or curator is optimal for individual collectors.

=== Safety and security ===
The safety of all objects in a collection should always be at the forefront of decision making. Human negligence is the largest factor in harm done to collections. The many types of objects in a collection require various handling procedures. Yet all objects have some handling rules in common: prepare yourself, do not rush, plan ahead, and think through the procedures before laying a hand on any object. Security is an important aspect of exhibition development that works to keep cultural heritage objects safe. Security measures can involve locking cases, adding weight or fasteners in a display case to prevent tipping, a security system, and having guards or staff members in the exhibition space.

=== Remedial preparation ===
Preventive conservation as a long term approach for conservation "involves maintaining the details of appearance and behavior of an object as well as possible and for as long as possible." At this point, a discussion about the condition of the object and the state to which stake holders would prefer the object should happen. The medium of an object will give rise to the desired appearance. For example, a painting with obvious problems to its structure, or the condition is questionable, may be deemed unusable for exhibition. Concerns for how an object should appear during an exhibition will precede a decision to conduct conservation treatment. The ideal state of an object is different for each collector and institution. The reason for having an object in the first place will affect the conservation treatment desired. A museum, for example, may research an object and hold the maker's, or artist's, original vision at the time of creation as being the ideal state. An object may have sentimental value for an individual collector, which could make the desired ideal state one of disrepair. The many versions of what an ideal state could be for an object is the work a conservator will do to prepare for any corrective action. If the object needs conservation/restoration treatment such as repairs, cleaning, and reframing, a time line and budget will usually be prepared by the conservator. Another concern is an object's matting, frame or mount, as these should be examined to ensure that the matting materials are archival and that the technique is appropriate.

=== Environment of the exhibition ===
The lighting and climate conditions of the exhibit space is an important factor to consider when preparing an object. Many mediums are extremely sensitive to light. Light is radiant energy that permanently damages light-sensitive materials by catalyzing degradation reactions. The space where an object will be exhibited should be inspected and the proper light levels should be recommended for the medium type. Sunlight coming through a window and hitting a wall where an oil painting hangs may not cause the same level of consequences as a light bulb directly over a manuscript on parchment. The recommended light levels for the type of object to be displayed can be referenced by consulting with a collections care professional, or the professional texts and websites listed below. The use of lux meters and ultraviolet meters can give the current light levels in an exhibit space.

The climate of the space is a factor of crucial concern, this consists of humidity and temperature. Humidity causes moisture absorption and acid hydrolysis which can facilitate biological attacks. Temperature influences the rate of chemical reactions, this can cause hardening or desiccation, leading to physical damage. Hygrothermographs, data loggers, and thermohygrometers can provide information on the climate levels in the exhibit space, and inside any cases or pedestals. Adjustments to the HVAC system may be made with the information gathered, or use buffering materials to reach the desired climate. The variables of an exhibit space environment must be weighed against the variables of the object's medium and condition. All of these variables will correlate to the desired exhibition conditions.

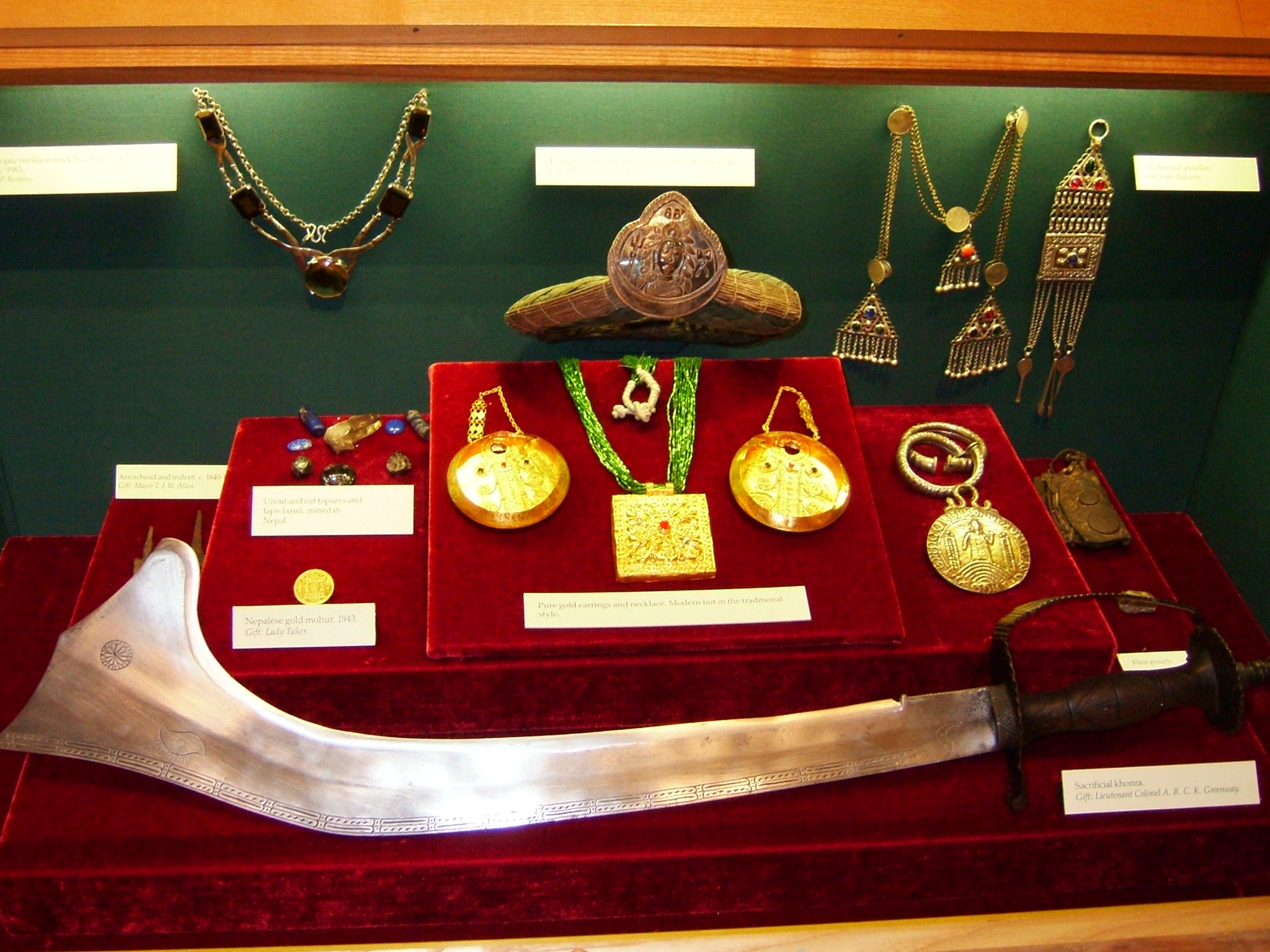
Objects on display with special mounts fabricated

A support and/or mount may need to be fabricated for the display. Mounts provide form and stability and relieve stress, thereby preventing distortions, creasing, and eventual damage. An analysis of the object's stress points and best angle for viewing should be considered when realizing the mount. The design of a mount should be as simple as possible with easy removal. The mount should keep the object from any movement while on display, as cases can be bumped by visitors.

=== Communication with cultural representatives ===
When ethnographic objects are chosen for exhibition, a line of communication with cultural representatives within the culture that created the object should happen to determine the proper preparation that follows their beliefs. The wide variety of organic and inorganic materials that ethnographic objects are made from, coupled with the cultural sensitivity required, constitutes a unique set of conservation concerns. The goal of a conservator is to stabilize an object and to preserve all of the cultural and historical information it contains, rather than only to restore its original appearance. The appearance of the object may give clues to its use and cultural significance, such as wear in a certain area or residue. The information these clues give is invaluable and consultation with experts in, and representatives of, the culture of origin will aid in decisions about the object's ideal state and any conservation treatments before display in an exhibition.

Objects have been collected from native cultures for hundreds of years, and the removal of objects from their origin has created much debate and legal policies have been created around acquiring and displaying them. The 1970 UNESCO Convention provided a framework among nations for alleviating abuses in the international trade of cultural property. An act of Congress to which collecting institutions that receive federal funding must adhere to is the Native American Graves Protection and Repatriation Act, or NAGPRA. This act requires consultation, among other things, with Native American tribes, Native Alaskans and Native Hawaiian organizations to reach agreements on repatriation or other disposition of remains and objects. In addition, NAGPRA prohibits trafficking in Native American human remains and cultural items. There are many regulations to adhere to when exhibiting objects. A knowledge of the various laws will be required by museum staff and an object's provenance should be well vetted before inclusion in an exhibition.

== See also ==
- Collection
- Curation (disambiguation)
- Conservation-restoration
- Collections care
- Provenance
- Collections policy
- Object conservation
- Collections maintenance
- Cultural heritage management
- Conservation-Restoration of Cultural Heritage
- Exhibition
