= Cultural property documentation =

Aspect of collections care

The documentation of cultural property is a critical aspect of collections care. As stewards of cultural property, museums collect and preserve not only objects but the research and documentation connected to those objects, in order to more effectively care for them. Documenting cultural heritage is a collaborative effort. Essentially, registrars, collection managers, conservators, and curators all contribute to the task of recording and preserving information regarding collections. There are two main types of documentation museums are responsible for: records generated in the registration process—accessions, loans, inventories, etc. and information regarding research on objects and their historical significance. Properly maintaining both types of documentation is vital for preserving cultural heritage.

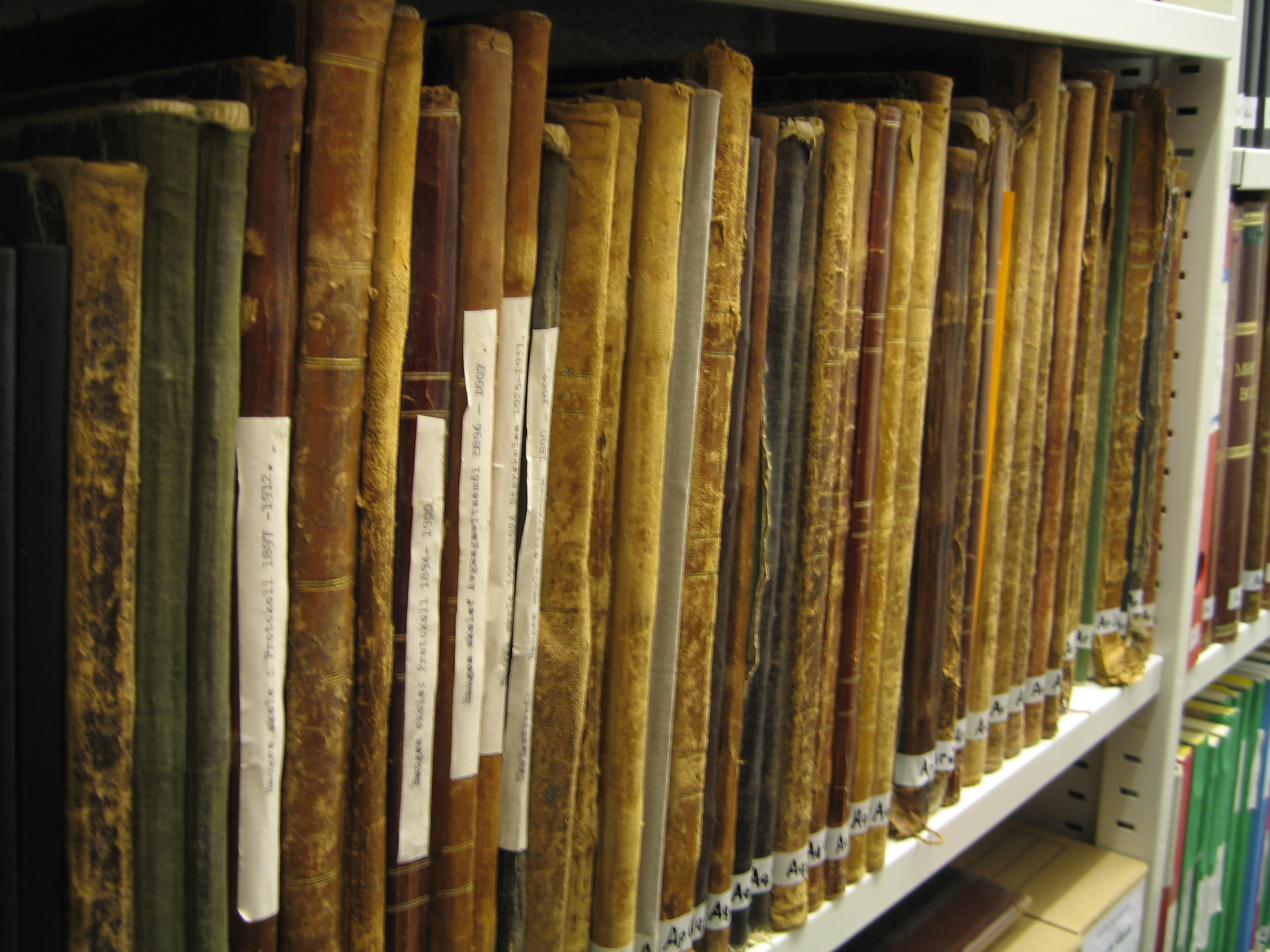
Historical paper files

== History ==
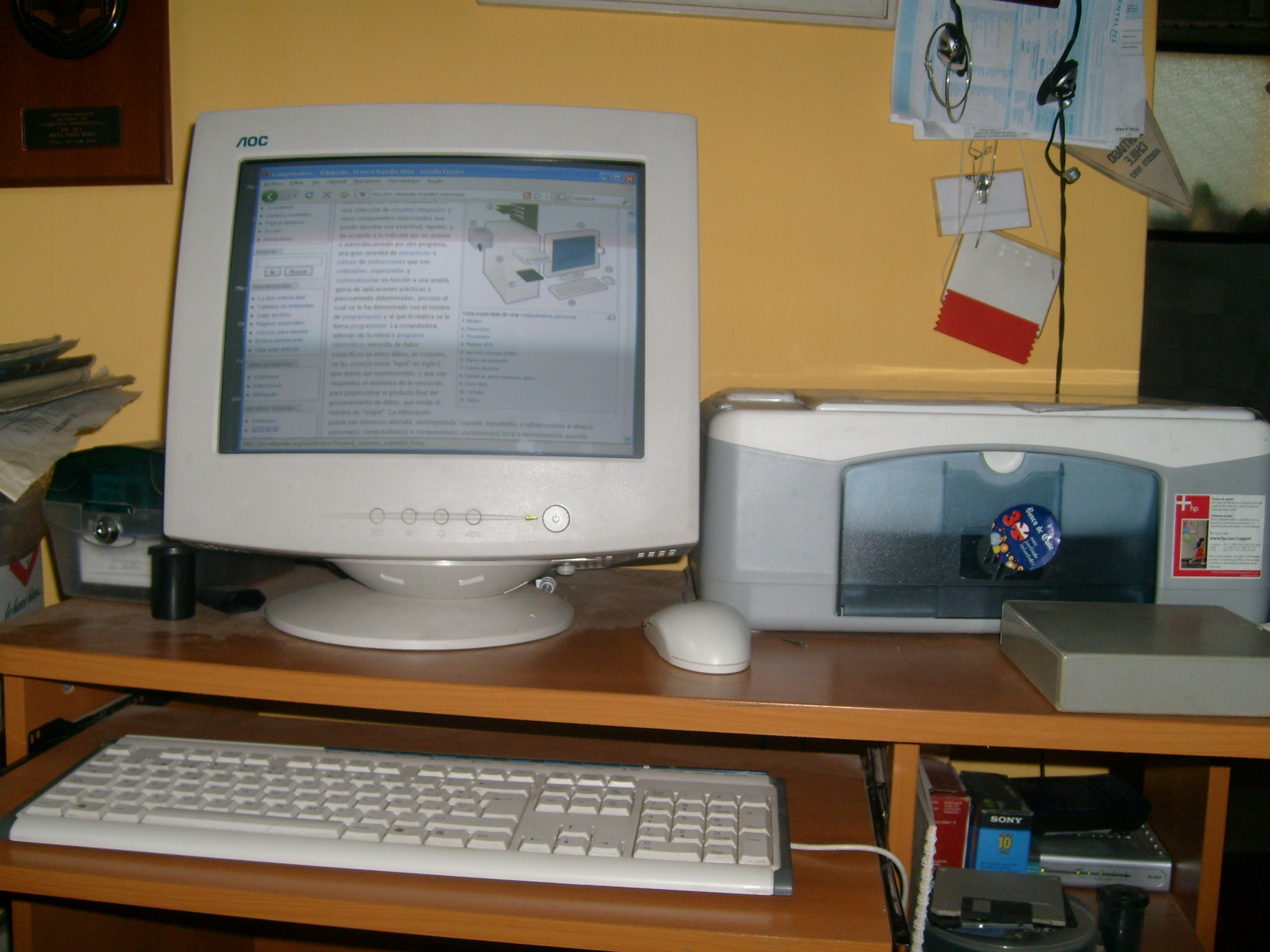
Computer databases have become essential to the documentation of cultural property

Practices for recording information about museum collections began developing in the late eighteenth century. Early collection control systems evolved from library prototypes, borrowing the idea of a sequential numbering system and accession ledgers to connect objects and the information about those objects. In the mid-1900s, formal registration training programs began appearing, and standards for documenting cultural collections were established. It was not until the late 1990s when computers became commonplace that any other major breakthroughs occurred in the documentation and object tracking methods of museums.

== Types of documentation ==
A comprehensive object file contains many different types of documentation, following the object through its life cycle. Some of the various events or facets of an object's life that require documentation are listed below:

=== Accessions ===
Acquiring objects, whether temporarily for loan or consideration or permanently for the collection, requires a great deal of documentation. Once an institution accepts responsibility for the care of an object, certain legal obligations are imposed: the item must be properly stored, maintained, conserved, and made available for the benefit of the public. Documenting activities pertaining to the stewardship of cultural property can be helpful in recording and assessing the fulfillment of these obligations. Before an object even arrives at an institution, the first piece of documentation produced is an Initial Custody Agreement. This document contains contact information for the owner/source of the object; intention for the outcome of this transaction—gift, loan, purchase, or bequest; responsibilities for insurance, packing, and shipping; and a description of the object. If the object is to be formally accessioned into the permanent collection, a Transfer of Title is also required upon the object's arrival. The documentation required for a transfer of title could be a Deed of Gift or a sale slip. As part of the standard accessioning process, condition reports are also created, numbers are assigned and marked, and photographs can be taken. These initial documents are the beginning of the object's file. If supplementary documentation, such as Donor and Provenance Questionnaires and research files pertaining to the object's history or context/art historical significance are available, they can be included in the file as well. Documentation of the provenance of a work of art has long been a valuable component of art historical research. In addition to providing insight into the history of art collecting, it can serve as a way to authenticate an object and determine conservation priorities.

=== Inventories ===
The creation and maintenance of a reliable, accurate, and up-to-date inventory is critical to any collecting institution. Institutions document their collections in order to preserve them and make them accessible to the public. Inventories support the responsible stewardship and preservation of cultural property by identifying objects that require conservation, identifying objects that may require improved storage conditions in order to prevent or mitigate deterioration, documenting the location and movement history of an object for security purposes, documenting the collection in the event of a catastrophic loss, enabling and inviting research on the collection, identifying poorly or undocumented objects so that they may be better researched and documented, identifying missing objects so that appropriate action may commence, and facilitating day-to-day management of the collection. Because inventories can require a sizable commitment of time and planning from staff, a complete, comprehensive inventory is usually conducted anywhere between every five to ten years. In between complete inventories, partial inventories and spot checks are conducted.

=== Loans and exhibitions ===
Other events in an object's life that require standard documentation procedures are loans—both outgoing and incoming—and exhibitions. Before an object is approved for either loan or exhibition, a condition report is usually recorded to determine whether the object is fit for travel and display. Condition reports provide valuable information about an object's state of preservation at a particular moment in time. They can be conducted by both collections managers/registrars and conservators, and can be crucial in benchmarking the types and/or rate of deterioration and documenting an object's condition history in order to prepare for its care in the future. Condition reports document any obvious blemishes, instabilities, old repairs, and pre-existing conditions. Some of the tools needed to conduct examinations and thoroughly document an object's condition are soft lead pencils, examination forms, a camera, a cloth tape measure, clean white cotton or nitrile gloves, padded muslin rolls and blocks, a flashlight, ultraviolet light, and magnification.

When considering outgoing loans, institutions can also request a General Facility Report form to verify that the borrowing museum meets the lending institution's minimum standards of climate control and security. Once a loan is approved, a loan agreement is drafted, which is a binding legal document detailing the minimum requirements of care while the object is in the borrower's possession, packing and transportation arrangements, insurance requirements, guidelines for reproduction and credit, and any other special provisions agreed upon by both institutions. Additional documentation that can accompany travelling objects could also include specific packing instructions with diagrams and an itemized shipping receipt or bill of lading. Copies of all of these documents are stored in the exhibition files, as well as the object's permanent file. An exhibition file could also contain checklists, gallery layouts and lists of object locations, conservation records, computer reports, installation photographs, gallery climate and pest-monitoring records, purchase requisitions, and correspondence relating to the exhibition.

=== Conservation treatment ===
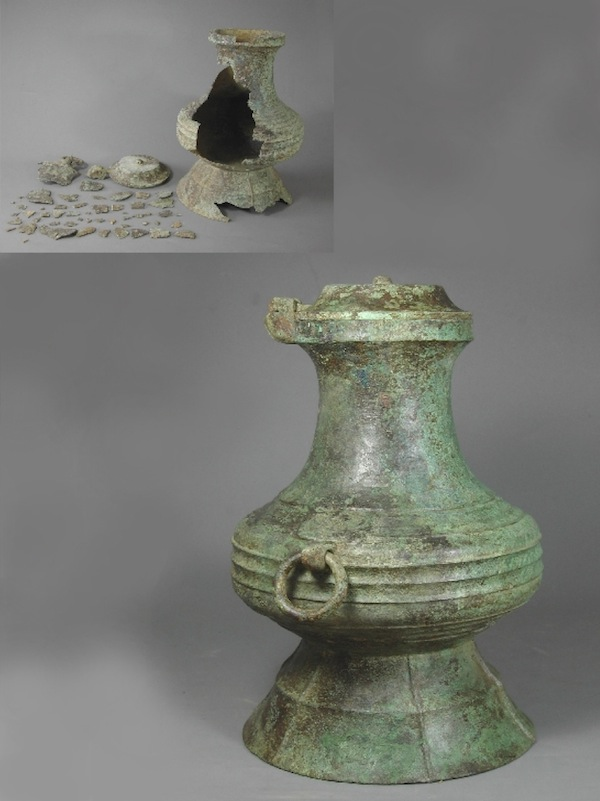
Before and after photographs of a conservation treatment, Bronze Hui sculpture

Documenting conservation treatments is a crucial part of managing collections. There is documentation required pre-treatment, e.g., proposals and examination results; documentation required post-treatment--reports; and photographs, which visually document the process before, during, and after treatment. In order to determine the conservation priorities and ideal state of an object, the conservator first consults historical/cultural research and conducts and documents a physical examination of the object. Physical examinations can be useful in understanding materials composition and causes of deterioration, and when properly documented, can provide a reference for future conservators. Proposals also document the justifications for the proposed course of action and treatment goals, using both physical and contextual rationale. Before any treatment begins, the object is thoroughly photographed to document the "before" state. Once the initial stages of the treatment and cleaning have commenced, more photographs are taken to document the "actual state" of the object, free of compensations and old varnishes.

During treatment, conservators also document the materials they used, reactions that occurred, information on reversibility, etc. Much of this information can also be summarized in a laboratory master report, which records information that may not be included in final reports, such as reasoning for methods, factors that determine choice of treatment and changes in methodology, material safety data sheets, etc. Final reports can contain this information as well but in less technical detail. A final report consists of "after" photographs, a summary of the work completed compared to the goals of treatment, and the conservator's contact information in case future conservators working on the object have questions about the previous work completed. Any documentation of conservation treatments is also stored in the object's permanent file for ease of accessibility and retrievability.

=== Curatorial and art historical information ===
Documentation describing the art historical context and significance of an object is important to maintain for research purposes. Typically curators develop this research and catalog their notes in the object file. They often publish their results as well, in order to advance the field and bring new understanding or interpretations to various art historical subjects. Many collections professionals benefit from the creation and maintenance of well-organized art historical documentation and research files. Conservators use this documentation in determining an ideal state for their treatment goals based on artistic intent and historical value. Collections managers use contextual documentation to determine the best storage and handling methods for objects depending on historical use. And other curators and researchers use this information to develop exhibitions and to learn about aesthetic and cultural motives, as well as technical qualities of objects.

=== Risk management ===
Identifying the risks that an institution faces and documenting the policies and measures in place to mitigate those risks is an important aspect of collections stewardship. Having a comprehensive, written Emergency response plan and Integrated pest management program, improves the museum's ability to minimize overall risk to the collections. Institutions also transfer the assumption of potential risks through the use of Insurance. Museums document and track the amount of insurance coverage they carry on each collection and/or object, as well as any specific provisions or exclusions. Any associated documentation needed for insurance claims, such as valuations and appraisals can also be kept in the object file.

Another facet of managing an institution's risks, involves diligently documenting and tracking the copyright status of each object in the collection. In order to avoid copyright infringement and costly legal problems, museum professionals develop standard processes for recording and updating copyright statuses of objects.

=== Deaccessions ===
When an institution decides to deaccession a cultural artifact, documentation discussing the process of consideration for this decision is required. The institution documents the value of the object, the reasons why it is no longer appropriate for the collection; namely: out of context, deteriorated beyond usefulness, duplicate of another object, etc., and how disposal of the artwork will be executed—private sale, auction, donation to another museum, etc. Written collecting and deaccession policies and procedures that clearly outline the collection priorities and acceptable rationale for deaccessions are also documented for the museum's records. This protects the museum from potential backlash when objects are removed from the collection.

== Documenting contemporary art ==
Documenting contemporary art requires a non-traditional approach. As artists increasingly use more ephemeral materials, installations, and digital content to meet their creative needs, the approach to defining the parameters of these new works and how to document them has necessarily evolved. "Traditionally, the documentation of artwork has focused on materiality and issues of authenticity. Materials are undeniably important to the way we understand art. A working knowledge of and familiarity with various media will allow a registrar to forecast storage needs, foster collections care, and recommend exhibition guidelines...but the conceptual core remains the essence of the work. The new challenge is how to effectively document a conceptual work." New strategies for capturing the conceptual core of contemporary artworks include recording perceptions of the work itself, documenting artist questionnaires and interviews to gain insight into intent and philosophy, and recording videos of installation and de-installation processes.

== Cataloging standards ==
Adhering to cataloging standards while creating and maintaining documentation is necessary for uniformity and accessibility. "Standards not only promote the recording of information consistently but are also fundamental to retrieving it efficiently. They promote data sharing, improve content management, and reduce redundant efforts. In time, the accumulation of consistently documented records across multiple repositories will increase access to content by maximizing research results. Ultimately, uniform documentation will promote the development of a body of cultural heritage information that will greatly enhance research and teaching in the arts and humanities." Standards can dictate processes like numbering and measuring, as well as data entry methods like choosing which categories of information to include (metadata sets), which words to use (thesauri and authority lists), and how to format data content.

=== Numbering and marking ===
Numbering and marking an object (usually with the object's accession number) is part of the initial cataloging process, which also includes standard procedures for measuring, photographing, and examining the condition of objects. Marking an object with its accession number (or temporary number if the object will not become part of the permanent collection) is how the object is identified and linked to its documentation. In order to track museum collections, to differentiate between permanent, loan, and subsidiary collections, and to provide access to the documentation of objects in the collection, systematic numbering schemes are used and each unique number is marked or tagged on the objects and prominently noted on all documentation associated with the objects. There are many ways to mark objects with their numbers. Depending on the type of object and desired permanence of the mark, some of the preferred methods include: archival quality paper tags with pencil, barrier coat with ink or paint, adhered labels, labels sewn with cotton tape, Reemay, or Tyvek, pencil directly on object (recommended for paper and photographs mostly), and Bar codes/RFID technology.

=== Categories and authority lists ===
Another way of controlling collections information to promote accessibility is utilizing standard formats of required data elements and preferred terminology when describing and documenting works of art, architecture, and cultural artifacts, as well as their images. There are numerous guides available for determining which descriptive information is necessary to an object file and how to format that information for ease of accessibility—Categories for the Description of Works of Art (CDWA), Cataloging Cultural Objects (CCO), etc. There are also a number of authority lists and thesauri available to documentation professionals, which can be very helpful in choosing preferred terminology in describing cultural objects. The Getty Research Institute has created comprehensive vocabularies, including The Art and Architecture Thesaurus (AAT), The Getty Thesaurus of Geographic Names (TGN), The Cultural Objects Name Authority (CONA), and The Union List of Artist Names (ULAN). Other valuable tools for professionals documenting cultural property are CAMEO and the American Institute for Conservation of Historic and Artistic Works' Lexicon Project, which are collaborative efforts designed to define and standardize terms used in the description of objects and materials used to conserve objects.

== Documentation management systems ==
In order to effectively manage all the documentation required to care for collections, organized systems are necessary. In the early days of museum registration simple paper ledgers were used to track objects, and documentation was stored in file cabinets. Since computers became more commonplace however, practices have evolved and very technologically advanced systems now exist to manage all aspects of collection management in one place.

=== CMS ===
Implementation of a Collections Management System (CMS) is now customary in museums of all specialties and sizes. A CMS is a database that can track object locations, prepare exhibition lists, create forms (insurance, shipping, loan, etc.), and organize conservation, publication, exhibition, provenance and curatorial information in files on the computer. All the data and documentation that was previously stored in paper object files is now entered or scanned into the CMS. (Paper copies can still be kept for archival purposes.) A flexible and robust CMS is capable of safely and securely storing information about collections objects, while simultaneously enhancing the capacity to share and disseminate cultural information to vast audiences via the internet.

=== DAMS ===
Another system that is fundamental to controlling and preserving collections documentation is a Digital Asset Management System (DAMS). A DAMS is digital archive that can hold resources (images, audio, and text) as well as the metadata used to describe them. These systems make organization, identification, and retrieval of images and other files more efficient. DAMS are also easily integrated with CMSs, so that as information on the CMS is cataloged and updated, it automatically synchronizes with the DAMS.

== Preservation ==
Creating good, well-organized records is a successful start, but preserving that documentation for the benefit of future generations is also paramount. Some methods of initiating long-term preservation of both digital and paper files are delineated below.

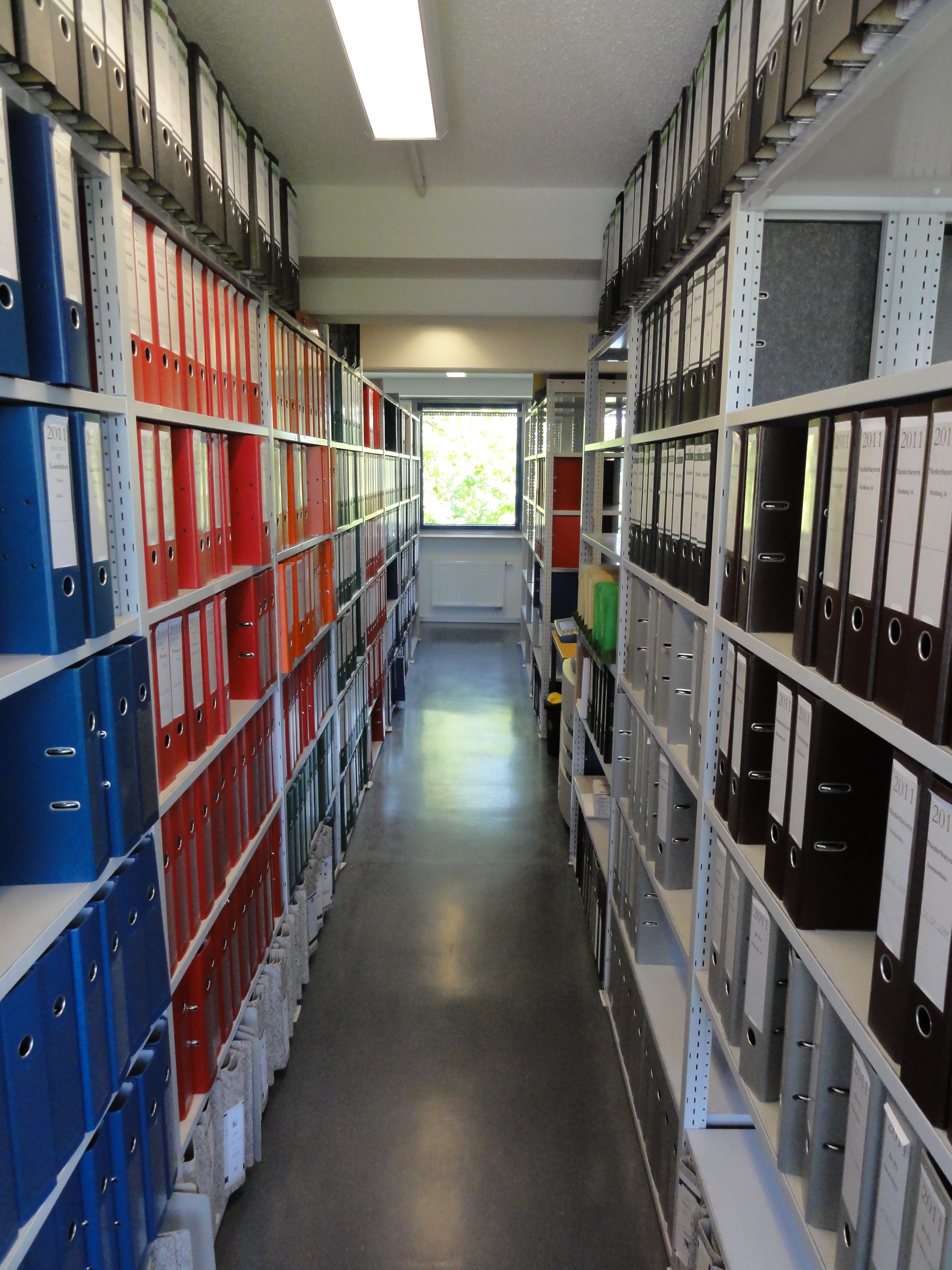
Institutional Archive

=== Archives ===
Many institutions maintain archives of their important documents. Documentation pertaining to the institution itself, as well as collections documentation is stored in the institutional archive or the library. Sometimes paper copies of collections files are stored offsite for extra safety and security (and for space considerations). An archive of collections information can have its own collecting policy and arrangement, unrelated to the way documents are organized in the current collections files. It is up to the Archivist to decide how to preserve and organize this collection of documents. Storage requirements for the various types of files in an archive (paper records, photographic material, electronic media, magnetic tape, etc.) are critical to the long-term preservation of the materials.

=== Backup ===
Information in museum documentation is often duplicated in multiple locations, in order to protect against loss of data. Backups are performed on a regular schedule and stored in separate systems or locations. Data can be duplicated and stored automatically on the system server or copied to external media, such as magnetic tape, optical disks, external hard drives, etc. "For long-term backup, 'live storage' is the most reliable method. The data are continuously rewritten in multiple electronic or physical locations, ensuring that information is not degrading from the effects of time or the failure of one single piece of hardware."

=== Data transfer ===
Another strategy for ensuring the long-term stability of digital files is to periodically migrate data from one form of media to another—usually from an outdated medium to a more current format. This process applies to both file formats and storage media. Simply transferring data from one medium to another, such as from a CD to DVD, without changing the format of the file, is also a form of preservation called Refreshing. Documentation of any file conversions or media transfers is stored in the records as well for historical reference.

== See also ==
- Collections management
- Collections maintenance
- Emergency response
- Conservator-restorer
- Collections policy
- Cultural conservation
- Collection (museum)
- Wikipedia:WikiProject Collections Care
