= PastPerfect Museum Software =

- Developer: PastPerfect Software Inc. (Formerly Pastime Software Company Inc.)
- Stable release: 5.0 / February 2010; 16 years ago
- Platform: Windows 98, Windows XP, Windows Vista, Windows 7, Windows 8, Windows 8.1
- Type: Digital asset management
- Website: museumsoftware.com

PastPerfect Museum Software is an application for collections management. It is designed for museums, but may be used by various institutions including libraries, archives, and natural history collections. PastPerfect allows for the database storage of artifacts, documents, photographs, and library books.

== History ==
PastPerfect was introduced in 1998 as the primary product of the then Pastime Software Company Inc. It was released in version two later the same year, updated to version three in 2001, and then to version four in 2004. It updated to version five in 2010, which remains the most current edition of the program. Pastime Software Company eventually changed its name to PastPerfect Software Inc. after 2007.

== Functionality ==
PastPerfect operates with four basic catalogs for sorting collections material. There is the archive catalog for storing documents, the photograph catalog for storing photos, tintypes, paintings, etc.; the objects catalog for storing three-dimensional artifacts, and the library catalog for storing books that would be included in the institution's library. Images can be uploaded into the catalog, with multiple photos per record. It also stores donor information, and automatically generates Deed of Gift forms and thank you letters upon completing certain steps of the accessioning process. Certain extensions allow for the inclusion of Oral History records and transcripts and there is an additional online function that allows institutions to digitize their collections and make them free to browse on the internet.

PastPerfect also contains a contact list function, for storing donors, members, and employee contact information in a similar catalog format as the rest of the program.

== PastPerfect Online ==
PastPerfect Online is a third-party online service for organizing digitized content for museums, libraries, and archives, with 602 current clients. PastPerfect Museum Software has in-house and hosted solutions.

== Other museum software vendors ==
- Altru by Blackbaud
- Modes
- My Tours
- Vernon Systems
- Museum Anywhere
- Explorer Systems
- Artifax Software
- Gatemaster
