= Found in collection =

Undocumented objects in a museum

"Found in collection" (FIC) is a term used by a museum to refer to "undocumented objects that remain without status after all attempts to reconcile them to existing records of permanent collection and loan objects are completed". Despite the best efforts of museum staff, museums often have FIC items. This term was developed so that collections with incomplete provenance would be handled ethically and with transparency. Depending on the paperwork and information accompanying the material, the museum has several choices in how to proceed.

== Occurrences ==
Museums today are meticulous about the documentation they keep when accessioning new items into their collections. However, this was not always the case. As the museum field professionalized so did the standard of paperwork required to accession a collection. Items can become FIC artifacts if records were not kept initially or if the documentation regarding the property transfer was lost in a disaster such as a fire or flood. Additionally, if the museum is old, it has decades of accessioning paperwork that may require its own preservation plan.

=== Lapsed loans ===
FIC collections can also be the result of long-term or permanent loans where contact has lapsed between the two parties. It is for this reason that most museums now renew their loans on an annual basis.

== Key participants ==
- Registrar/Collections Manager: Ultimately registrars and collections managers are in charge of accession paperwork and artifact documentation. Collections staff are responsible for assembling as much information as possible on the provenance of the objects in order to help the Collections Committee and other staff make the most informed decision they can.
- Collections Committee: A Collections Committee at a museum is composed of curators, collections staff, educators and senior administrators who decide what will become part of the museum's collection based on the museum's collections management policy. Just as importantly, the Committee rules on items that should be removed from a museum's collection due to duplication or lack of relevance to the museum's mission. The Committee will also discuss collections related issues including any FIC artifact concerns.
- Legal Counsel: The Collections staff and legal counsel need to work closely together. There are very specific laws governing museums and unclaimed property.
- Director/President & Board of Trustees: The Director and Board of Trustees all need to sign off and be aware of accessions and deaccessions to their museum's collection. They rely heavily on the recommendation of the Collections Committee.
- Public Relations Officer: While museums try to deal with FIC items openly, the knowledge that museums may not have complete intellectual and physical control of their collections can sometimes cause controversy or public concern. The Public Relations Officer is in charge of explaining how museum's work, how the situation has occurred, and what is being done to solve the problem. Public education and transparency can go a long way towards keeping the relationship between the community and museum positive.
- Claimant: During the FIC process a claimant may come forward to stake a claim to the found property. Depending on the nature of the claim and whether or not the claimant is a person or organization different procedures will be followed. However, the claimant must provide some type of documentary evidence to support their position.

== What constitutes ownership ==
Museums require three pieces of information to accession a collection.

1. Written intent to donate on behalf of the donor.
2. Acceptance of the collection into the museum's holdings by the museum (usually through the Collections Committee).
3. Physical possession of the collection.

The most common way this is achieved is through a Deed of Gift, which states these three criteria in one document.

== What action can be taken ==
Regardless of whether or not the museum wishes to retain ownership of the item, if possible the collections staff should contact the previous owner to either obtain a deed of gift or return the collection.

=== Short term ===
In order to keep track of the FIC collection, a temporary number should be assigned that is completely different in format from the museum's accession number to avoid further confusion. Whether the item is to be accessioned or deaccessioned, it requires establishing a chain of custody, which can be started with the application of a temporary number and assemblage of any associated documentation.

=== Long term ===
- If the museum wishes to keep the collection:

It should try to obtain ownership by following its state's unclaimed property laws or applicable international conventions. If during the found property process a claimant wishes to challenge the museum's tie to the collection, the claimant must support their case with evidential paperwork.

- If the museum does not want the collection:

If the museum does not want to keep the artifacts due to them being irrelevant to its mission or outside of its collecting scope, it has several options. If the museum can contact the previous owner or heirs it should do so and return the collection. If the collection has no associated paperwork, the museum should follow the appropriate laws and conventions. Once it establishes ownership through that process the museum can legally and ethically follow its deaccession procedures. This may involve transfer the collection to another cultural institution, selling the collection at public auction, or if all other methods fail, destruction of the collection.

== International conventions ==
The 1970 UNESCO Convention was created to provide a platform and environment in which countries could discuss situations in which cultural property may have been illegally transported. Throughout history cultural property has been taken as the spoils of war or trafficked by desperate individuals in order to make a profit. For this reason museums may have to consider the 1970 UNESCO convention on the Means of Prohibiting and Preventing the Illicit Import, Export, and Transfer of Ownership of Cultural Property when sifting through FIC collections. It is important to pay particularly close attention to documentation of items that may have been acquired from conflict zones as sometimes customs forms and bills of sale are faked.

== Federal legislation ==
=== Antiquities Act of 1906 ===
The Antiquities Act of 1906, signed by Theodore Roosevelt, was the first federal law enacted in response to a growing concern regarding the protection of cultural property. The law stated that antiquities could not be removed or damaged on federal property without the express permission of the government. While not completely enforced in its day, it did set a precedent for caring for national cultural property.

=== Archaeological Resources Protection Act of 1979 ===
The Archaeological Resources Protection Act (ARPA) was a much needed upgrade to the 1906 Antiquities Act. It updated definitions to close loopholes and increased fines and penalties for violators. If museums have FIC collections that may have been obtained in violation of the 1906 and 1979 legislation, they should seek legal advice and follow the provisions in the Acts.

=== Native American Graves Protection and Repatriation Act ===
The Native American Graves Protection Act (NAGPRA) was signed into law in 1990 to specifically to "affirm the rights of lineal descendants, Indian tribes, and Native Hawaiian organizations to custody of Native American human remains, funerary objects, sacred objects, and objects of cultural patrimony that are in the control of federal agencies and museums". Unfortunately throughout the history of the United States, Native American cultural property and even human remains were not acquired with the consent, let alone documentation. Because of this, Native American and Native Hawaiian artifacts are often FIC. In trying to resolve these culturally sensitive FIC items, NAGPRA legislation should be followed.

== Other resources ==
- Museum Registration Methods 5th Edition Edited by Rebecca A. Buck & Jean Allman Gilmore
- A Legal Primer on Managing Museum Collections Third Edition by Marie C. Malaro & Ildiko Pogany DeAngelis
- http://www.foundincollections.com/: A helpful website with checklists to walk a Registrar or Collections Manager through the FIC process.
- National Park Service Museum Handbook: Part II contains information on accessioning and how to handle old loans.
- AAM Collections Stewardship: The American Alliance of Museums' (AAM) website contains helpful information, particularly if one is a member of AAM.
- Legal Issues in Museums: AAM article containing resources for all types of legal issues museums may face.
- IMLS: The Institute of Museum and Library Services provides support of all types for collections staff.
