= FICS =

FICS may refer to:

- Falkland Islands Community School
- Fellow of the International College of Surgeons
- Finance in Common, an international inivitatives
- Free Internet Chess Server, a volunteer-run chess server
- Fellow of the Institution of Chartered Surveyors, until 1946 – now FRICS
- International Federation of Sports Chiropractic (French: Fédération Internationale de Chiropratique du Sport)

== See also ==
- FIC (disambiguation)
