= FIC =

FIC may refer to:

- Federazione Italiana Canottaggio (Italian Rowing Federation)
- Falkland Islands Company
- Fascia iliaca block
- Family Institute of Connecticut
- Family integrated church
- Federation of Irish Cyclists
- Feline idiopathic cystitis
- Fellow of the Royal Institute of Chemistry
- Fellowship for Intentional Community, in the United States
- Festival Internacional da Canção, a Brazilian music festival
- Fiction
  - Fanfiction
- First International Computer a Taiwanese electronics manufacturer
- Flight Information Centre, in Canada
- Focused information criterion
- Fortifications Interpretation Centre, in Malta
- Found in collection
- Fox International Channels
- Fraser International College, in Burnaby, British Columbia, Canada
- John E. Fogarty International Center, part of the United States National Institutes of Health
- Fully industrialised country (FIC)
