= Mount maker =

Person who makes supportive structures for displays

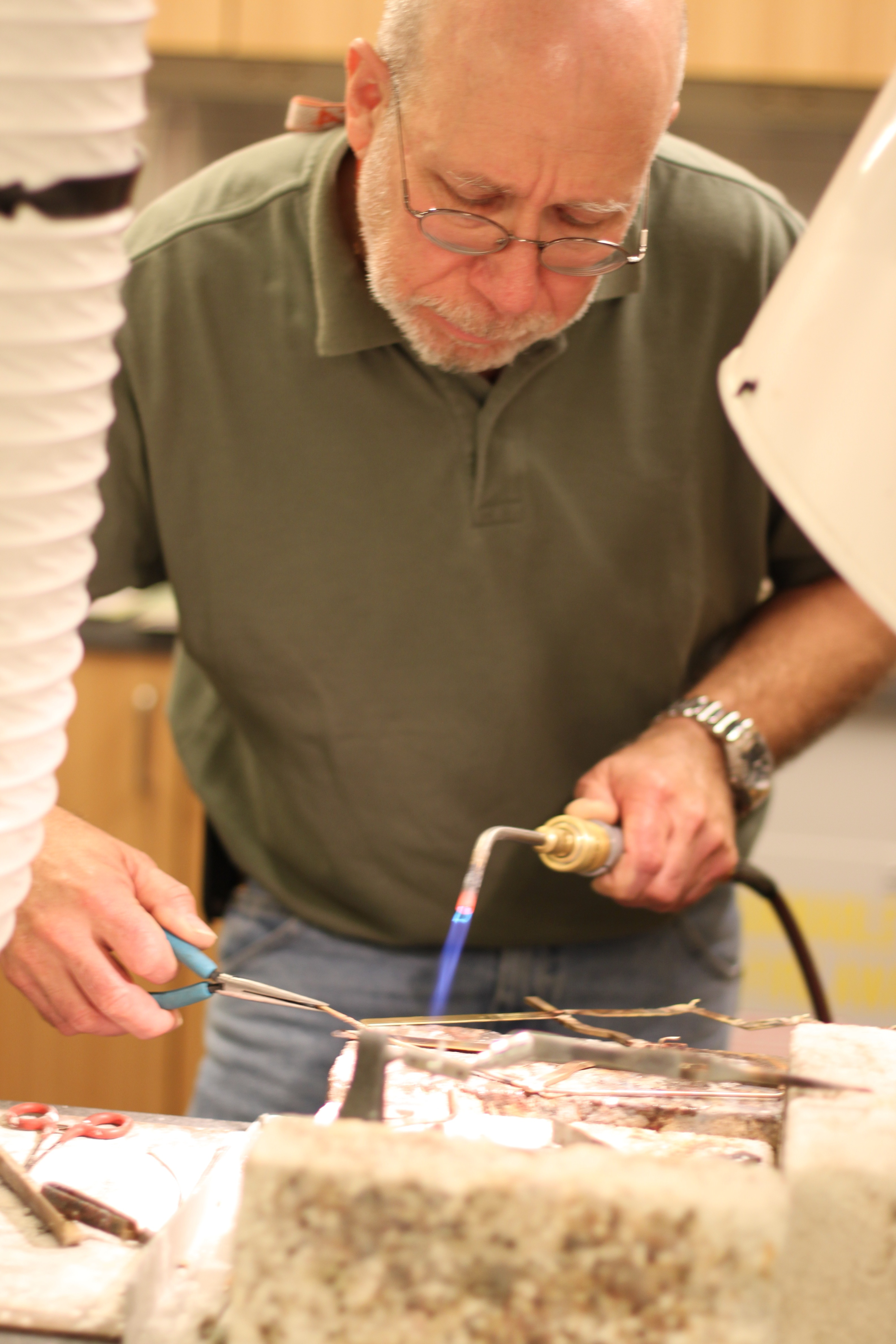
Mount maker welding together a new mount

A mount maker is responsible for the creation of structures called object mounts used to provide unobtrusive physical support, stability, and security of objects while on display, in storage, or being transported to museums, art galleries, libraries, archives, botanical gardens or other cultural institutions. Protection and long-term conservation of the object is a key goal of mount makers. This is accomplished through careful design, selection of materials and manufacturing process that will not inadvertently harm the object, and a cautious installation process of the object into its place in an exhibit. Professionals in this field can be employed directly by an institution, be independent contractors, or work as part of larger cultural institution exhibit design firms.

== Responsibilities and duties ==
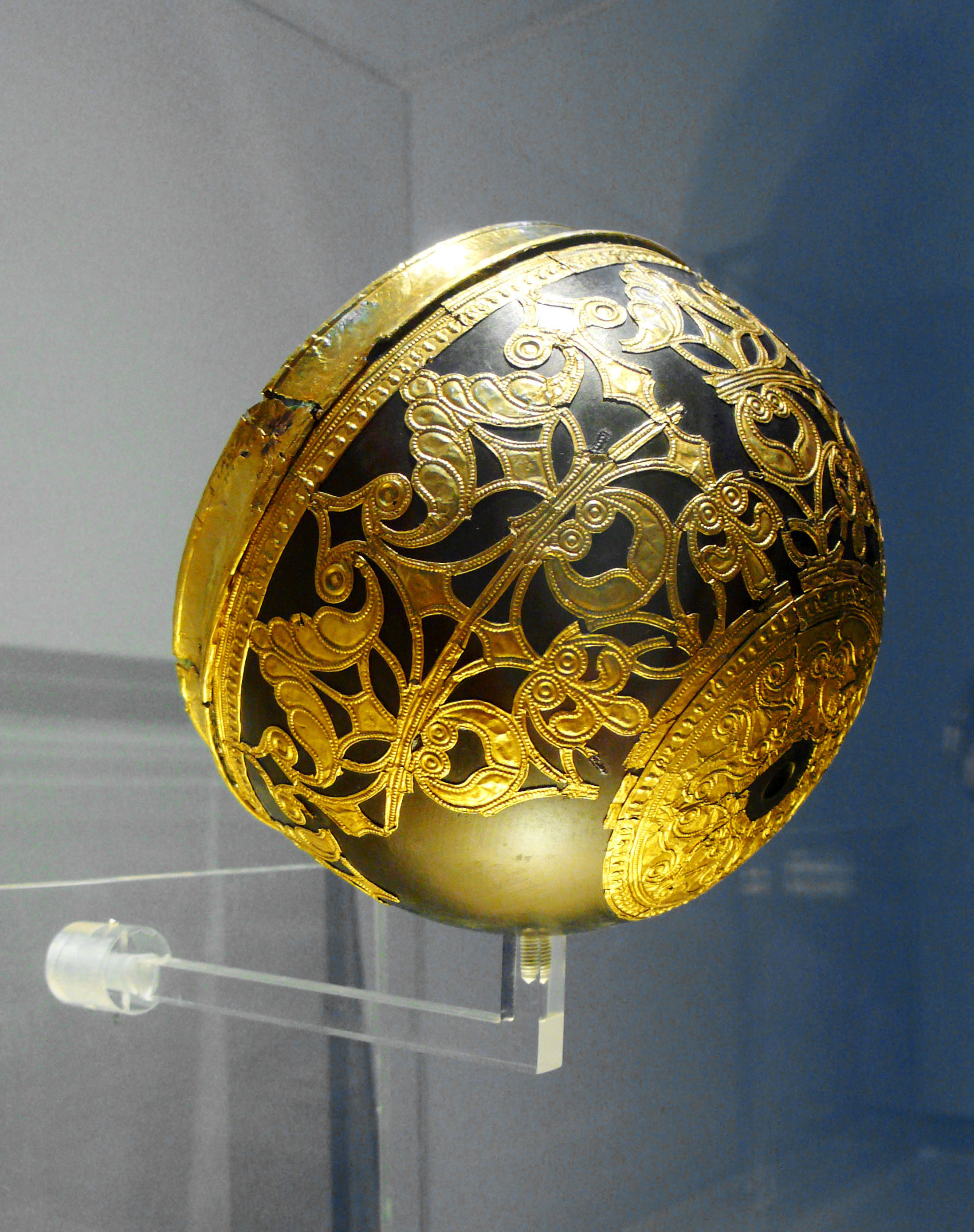
Ornamental gold mounts

The primary responsibility of a mount maker is to provide safe and stable structural supports (also called mounts, brackets, or armatures) for a wide variety of cultural materials such as furniture, ceramics, paintings, sculptures, clothing, jewelry, aircraft, and machinery to be placed in storage, transported to another location, or for exhibition. Providing form and stability alleviates stress placed on an object, "thereby preventing distortions, creasing, and eventual structural damage." A successful mount will keep objects from moving in the event that an object's exhibit case is bumped or otherwise disturbed in addition to allowing visitors to view and interpret an object in new and unobtrusive ways. The object should be the subject of the viewer's attention, not the mount; allowing as much visual access as possible.

Mount makers work with two types of mounts; custom mounts and generic mounts. Custom mounts are specially created to the exact dimensions, weight, and any specific stability or support issues in response to the preservation and conservation of a particular object. The type and design of each custom mount is also determined by the budget and skill of the mount maker. In contrast, generic mounts require only rough measurements of the object. These general or prefabricated shelves, brackets, or stock forms can be purchased from museum or archival supply companies.

Mount makers collaborate with registrars, exhibit designers, curators, lighting technicians, and installers to develop or select mounts for each object that will be displayed in an exhibit. Mount makers also work "closely with conservators to learn the strengths and weaknesses of the objects and to find safe fabrication materials." Some types of materials may include batting, cardboard, corrugated plastic such as coroplast, felt (polyester or acrylic), Foam Board (Foamcore), Gator Foam (Gator Board), muslin, Plexiglas, and some metals such as brass and steel. Additional materials can include aluminum, stainless steel, acrylic, and resin.

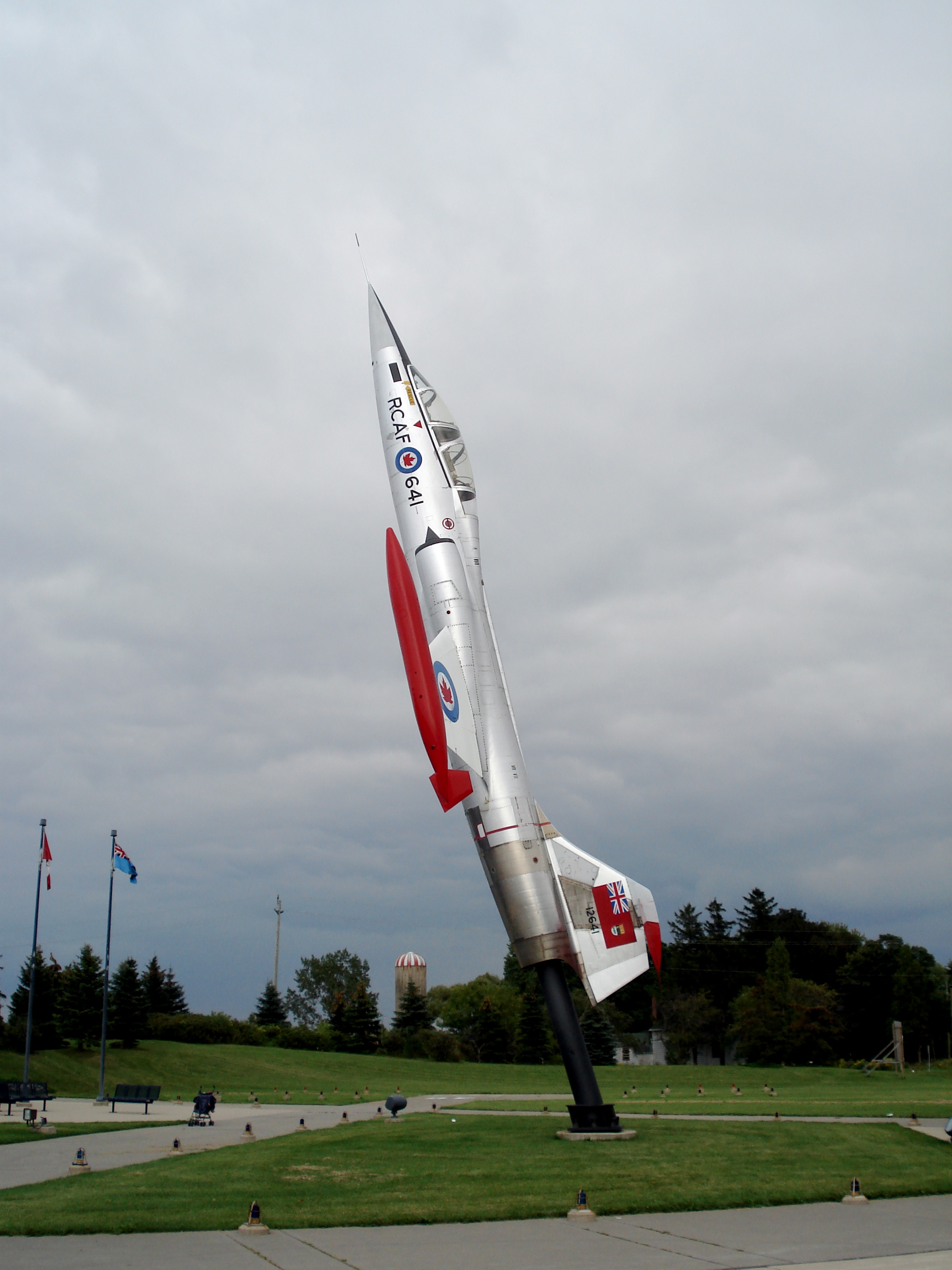
CF-104 Starfighter mounted as a monument in front of Canadian Warplane Heritage Museum.

== Knowledge, abilities and skills ==
After considering which material is best suited for an object, mount makers then fabricate a mount to the specification of the object using hand-held tools and general shop equipment. Mount makers must be knowledgeable about the many different choices for soldering and welding, saws, buffers, and grinders and skilled in their use. Tools more specific to fabrication of basic mounts include a 10-inch to 1 inch Band saw, either a freestanding or bench top drill press, a 1 inch by 8 inch Disk combination sander, and a vacuum with either a minimum 5 micron filter or a HEPA filter.

Some mount makers specialize in a specific medium such as metal or plastic. All should be knowledgeable in artifact handling, have a working understanding of chemistry, physics, mechanics, and be an expert in the area of problem solving and time management. Mount makers have been described as having the skills of "jewelers, welders, fabricators, machinists, and blacksmiths - for artwork." Other skills that may be needed include carpentry, metal working, experience with computer aided design programs, painting, and modeling.

== Education, training, experience ==
Mount makers come from a wide range of professional and educational backgrounds. Individuals seeking to become a mount maker mush have experience in design, fabrication, and a familiarity with handling objects. Effective communication skills and the ability to work both alone and on a team are also highly desirable. Mount makers may have Bachelor of Arts (B. A.), a Bachelor of Fine Arts (B. F. A.), or a Bachelor of Science (B. S.) in fine arts, studio art, conservation, design, or industrial arts from an accredited university. Conversely, individuals may have a background that is technical in nature such as in construction or automotive repair. Continuing education courses, workshops, and symposiums in mount making are available through various cultural institutions such as the Northern States Conservation Center, the Corcoran College of Art and Design, the Canadian Conservation Institute and the Field Museum of Natural History.

== Professional organizations ==
Mount Makers have memberships in a variety of professional organizations such as the Preparation, Art handling, Collections Care Information Network (PACCIN), the International Convention of Exhibition and Fine Art Transporters (ICEFAT), and the National Association for Museum Exhibitions (NAME) in order to stay current with professional best practices and have access to a broad informational network of colleagues.

A Professional Interest Committee of the American Alliance of Museums, PACCIN "is dedicated to building a museum industry network of information and resources available for the educational dialogue of professionals interested in the high standards of art and artifact handling. The area of focus of these standards include packing, crating, shipping, installation, mount making, rigging, exhibition fabrication, educational employment opportunities as well as ongoing industry updates of current technical and material usage."

The International Convention of Exhibition and Fine Art Transporters hosts "annual conventions where members meet to exchange ideas and establish relationships with associates world wide in the field of packing, shipping and forwarding works of art, artifacts and antiquities."

Also a Professional Interest Committee of the American Alliance of Museums, the focus of NAME is on advocating the importance o exhibitions and "promot[ing] excellence and best practices, identify trends and recent innovations, provide access to resources, promote professional development and cultivate leadership" to a membership of over 800 museum professionals.

== See also ==
- Art handler
- Collection manager
- Conservator-restorer
