= Fraser International College =

Coordinates: 49°16′26″N 122°54′45″W

Fraser International College (FIC) is situated in Burnaby, British Columbia, Canada, and commenced its operations in September 2006.

FIC functions as a private educational institution in partnership with Simon Fraser University. The courses offered at FIC are developed in collaboration with SFU's faculty and departments, ensuring a meticulous approach to course content and academic standards.

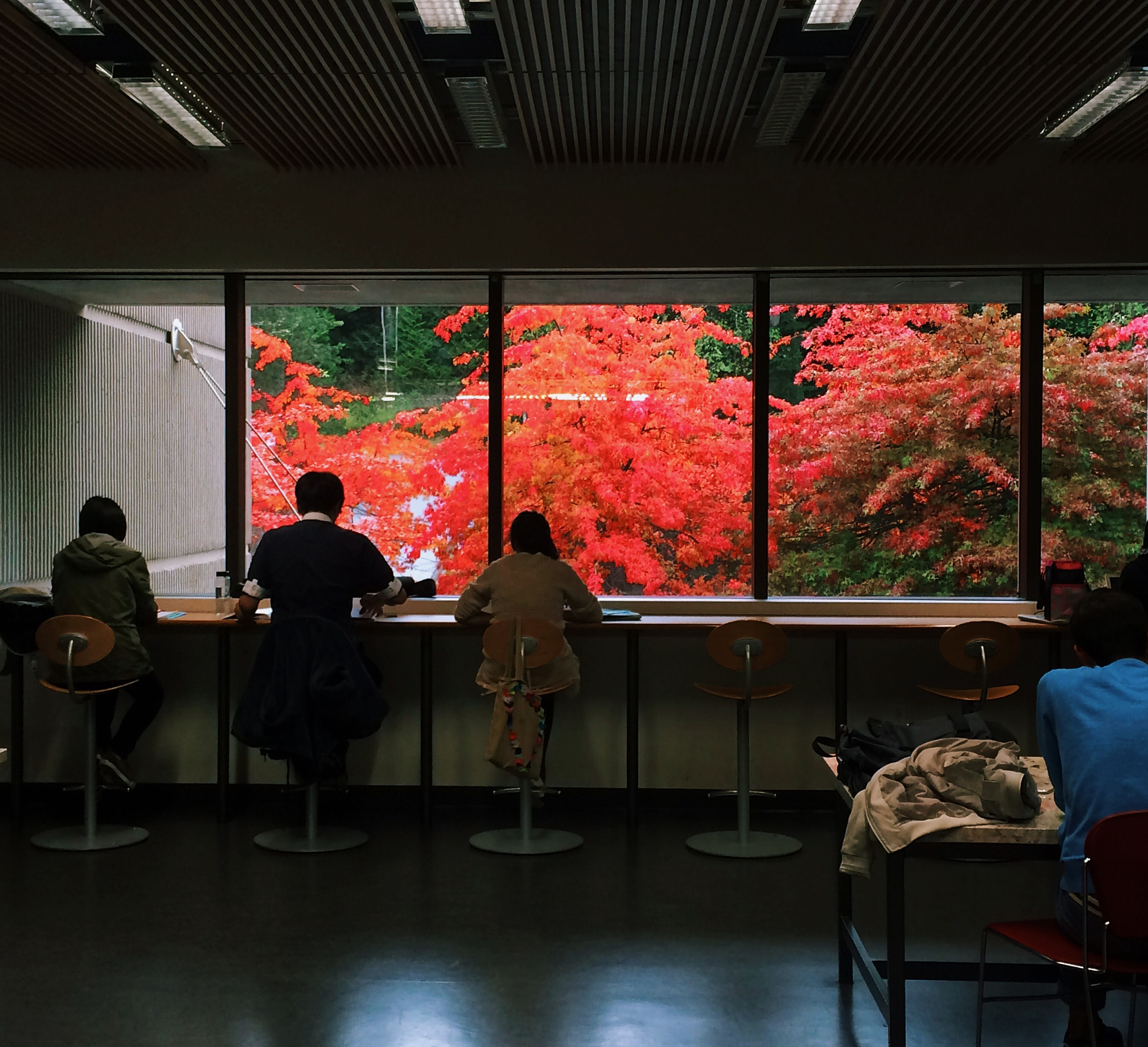
FIC study hall fall 2015

While under original and preliminary discussions at SFU, the FIC proposal (then called IBT) was the source of no deal of controversy. FIC is operated by Navitas Limited, a publicly listed Australian educational company (formally International Business and Technology Education Ltd.).

FIC currently has more than 1,300 students enrolled. Students in FIC come from more than 35 countries/regions.

== Undergraduate Program ==
FIC provides 1-year pre-university programs (UTP Stage II) and guarantees direct transfer to Simon Fraser University when GPA reaches the standards according to different majors. The programs of UTP Stage II are relevant to first year programs at Simon Fraser University. Students need to take required credits for transfer and the required courses are based on the majors.

=== Majors in UTP Stage II ===
- Arts and Social Sciences
- Business Administration
- Communication and Business
- Communication, Art and Technology
- Computing Science
- Engineering Science
- Environment
- Health Science

=== Associate of Arts Degree ===
FIC also has an Associate of Arts Degree with a duration of 2 years.

== Foundation Program ==
The Foundation program (UTP Stage I) is a program for students to prepare for the university-level programs in Business Administration, Computing Science, Engineering Science, or Arts and Social Sciences. Students in this stage need to consider their planned university major to choose 8 courses from a list before going to Stage II.

=== Course List of UTP Stage I ===
- Beginning with Algebra
- Business Management
- English Skills/Reading
- Introduction to Computers and their Applications
- Introduction to Computing Concepts and Algorithms
- Introduction to Economics
- Introduction to Mathematics
- Introduction to Philosophical Reasoning
- Introduction to University Life 1
- Introduction to University Writing
- World Issues
