= Registrar (cultural property) =

Job position in a cultural heritage institution

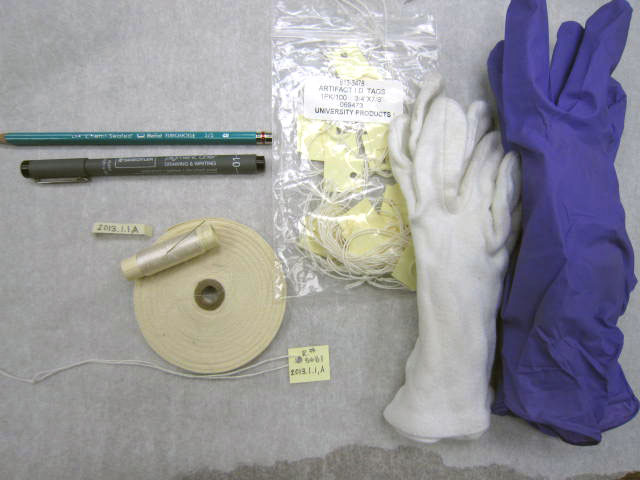
Registrational materials include a soft pencil, archival pen, thread/needle, cotton twill tape, acid-free tags, cotton gloves, and Nitrile gloves for accessioning

A museum/library/archival registrar is responsible for implementing policies and procedures that relate to caring for collections of cultural institutions like archives, libraries, and museums. These policies are found in the museum's collections policy, the guiding tenet of the museum explaining why the institution is in operation, dictating the museum's professional standards regarding the objects left in its care. Registrars focus on sections that include acquisitions, loans, exhibitions, deaccessions, storage, packing and shipping, security of objects in transit, insurance policies, and risk management.

As a collections care professional, they work with collection managers, conservators, and curators to balance public access to objects with the conditions needed to maintain preservation. Focusing on documentation, registrars are responsible for developing and maintaining records management systems, with individual files for each object in the collection. Smaller and mid-sized institutions may combine the role of registrar with that of collections manager, while large institutions often have multiple registrars, each overseeing a different curatorial department.

== Responsibilities and duties ==
The role of registrar was first defined in the early 1900s, and while the job description has not changed appreciably over time, the responsibilities have evolved with technology and increasing global awareness. Successful registrars deftly manage many projects at once, maintain calm focus, and diligent attention to detail. Collaborating with other departments and community associations is key.

A selection of the most critical responsibilities include:

- Documentation: From the position's creation, registrars are most concerned with documentation and record keeping. This documentation includes information about an object's condition, its accession number (or identification number, depending on its status at the museum), provenance, materials, and all of its movement within the museum or out on loan. Paper registers have been replaced by Collection Management Software, and this data is stored in multiple locations as a safeguard.
- Acquisitions: When an object arrives at the museum for the first time as a prospective addition to the collection, a registrar immediately begins the documentation and tracking process by assigning a temporary identification number and assembling records that include the object's condition, date of arrival, the reason for its arrival at the museum, and a photograph documenting its physical appearance. This information follows the object through the acquisition process, tracking its movements. If the museum decides to accept the object, the registrar will then update the record, assigning a permanent accession number to the object. The registrar also makes recommendations to the Collections Committee. Using the museum's Collections Management Policy, the registrar assesses whether or not the object fits the collection, determines whether the museum has the necessary resources to properly care for the object, and ascertains that provenance can be established to protect the museum from potential litigation.
- Loans: Objects are loaned between museums for a variety of reasons, typically for special exhibitions. As with acquisitions, the registrar assigns a temporary identification number to objects on loan to the museum, documents their condition, and creates a file to follow the object's movement while it is in the museum. Registrars are also present at the loading dock upon arrival to supervise the unloading, condition of packing material, and ensure that the objects are handled properly. In the case of outgoing loans, the registrar documents which objects are leaving the museum and either carries out or oversees their packing for shipment, and loading into the shipping vehicle.
- Exhibitions: Working together with curators and collection managers, the registrar helps select objects for display or loan. This means occasionally saying 'no' to colleagues to safeguard objects for the future. If an object will not withstand the stresses of travel and/or an exhibition, it is the registrar's duty to make that clear and stand behind their decision. Once objects are selected and agreed upon, the registrar updates the records to reflect the display location.
- Deaccessions: Registrars are also involved in carrying out deaccessions. Historically, museums did not follow strict guidelines for accepting donations. As a result, objects that have little or nothing to do with the institution's mission statement sit in storage until they can be deaccessioned, or removed from the museum's collection. Storage space and resources are valuable, and therefore it does not make sense to maintain objects that the museum cannot display. Registrars assess these objects, make recommendations, and verify that all legal conditions are met to deaccession the object, and document every step of the process. Since this process can be controversial, it is critical that every step, as described by the museum's policy, are carried out diligently and openly.
- Packing and Shipping: When objects are sent out of the museum, either being returned to the institution that provided them or as an outgoing loan to another museum, the registrar updates the registration system to documents which objects are leaving the museum. The Condition report is updated to reflect the pre-shipping state of the object, and the registrar either carries out or oversees the packing for shipment, and loading into the shipping vehicle.
- Security in Transit: Most, if not all, objects on outgoing loan are accompanied by a courier. The registrar selects and trains this individual, and, in the case of extremely important objects, the registrar may accompany the shipment, acting as a courier themselves.
- Risk Management: A main task for a registrar is also determining risk factors to a collection and mitigating them. Risk factors include vandalism, theft, pests, emergencies, and natural disasters. It is the responsibility of the registrar to develop and implement strategies to minimize these risks, such as integrated pest management, guards, and secure display cases. Additionally registrars oversee the development and implementation of a disaster management policy to safeguard both staff and collections objects in case of emergency.

== Knowledge, abilities, and skills ==
A registrar should show strength and skill when handling objects. From physically moving an object to being able to identify any stress points or cultural significance, a registrar must take the initiative to study the museum's collection. They must be calm, flexible, resourceful, and focus on the details. Registrars can be described as academic generalists, who, over time, can develop specializations.

Working knowledge of American Association of Museum's Code of Ethics as well as the Collecting Guidelines for Museums should be required to be successful and respectful of any cultural or intrinsic objects. A registrar should be familiar with the AAM Guide to Provenance Research, as well as the Nazi-Era Provenance Internet Portal. A registrar should also be familiar with Digital Fair Use and the US Indemnity Program. In addition, a registrar should understand repatriation processes, both nationally and internationally.

As a member of a unique institution, a registrar must possess the ability to be successful in a team-oriented environment. Teaching qualities and customer service skills are helpful when trying to relay the importance of a collection's protection or access to a different department within the museum.

== Education and training ==
Individuals looking to begin a career in the Collections Management field generally possess a bachelor's degree in history, art history, fine arts, or a field related to museum interests. Many institutions now require a graduate education in museum studies or field relating to the museum's collections in this competitive job market. Candidates are also expected to have hands-on experience in museum collection database management, object packing and handling, digitization, collections cataloging, and accession and loan procedures.

Internships and volunteer work in cultural institutions are excellent ways to gain experience and make connections with museum professionals. By taking initiative to acquire experience, paid or unpaid, a candidate will also develop their organizational skills, familiarity with procedure, and the inherent flexibility needed to succeed as a registrar.

== Related positions ==
Smaller museums tend to combine the role of registrar with that of collection manager, in which case one person (or team) would oversee the traditional responsibilities of a registrar with the addition of a more hands-on role in collections care. Added duties include: overseeing and maintaining environmental conditions in storage and exhibition facilities, taking a more active role in conditions assessments and contacting conservators directly, managing physical storage needs, and taking inventory of the collection at regular intervals.

=== Organizations/professional societies ===
State and regional associations (such as the Southeastern Registrar's Association) often organize classes, workshops, or conferences surrounding a contested topic or previously scheduled cultural event.

- American Alliance of Museums (AAM)
- Registrars Committee of the Association of Museums (RCAAM)
- Association of Registrars and Collections Specialists
- Collections Trust
- Committee on Museum Professional Training
- Heritage Preservation
- International Council of Museums (ICOM)
- National Association for Museum Exhibition
- Preparation, Art Handling, Collections Care Information Network (PACCIN)
- PIC Green Network
- Society for the Preservation of Natural History Collections (SPNHC)

== See also ==
- Collection
- Collections care
- Collections policy
- Conservation-restoration
- Curation (disambiguation)
- Digital preservation
- Disaster recovery plan
- Nazi plunder
- Object conservation
- Provenance
