= Archives management =

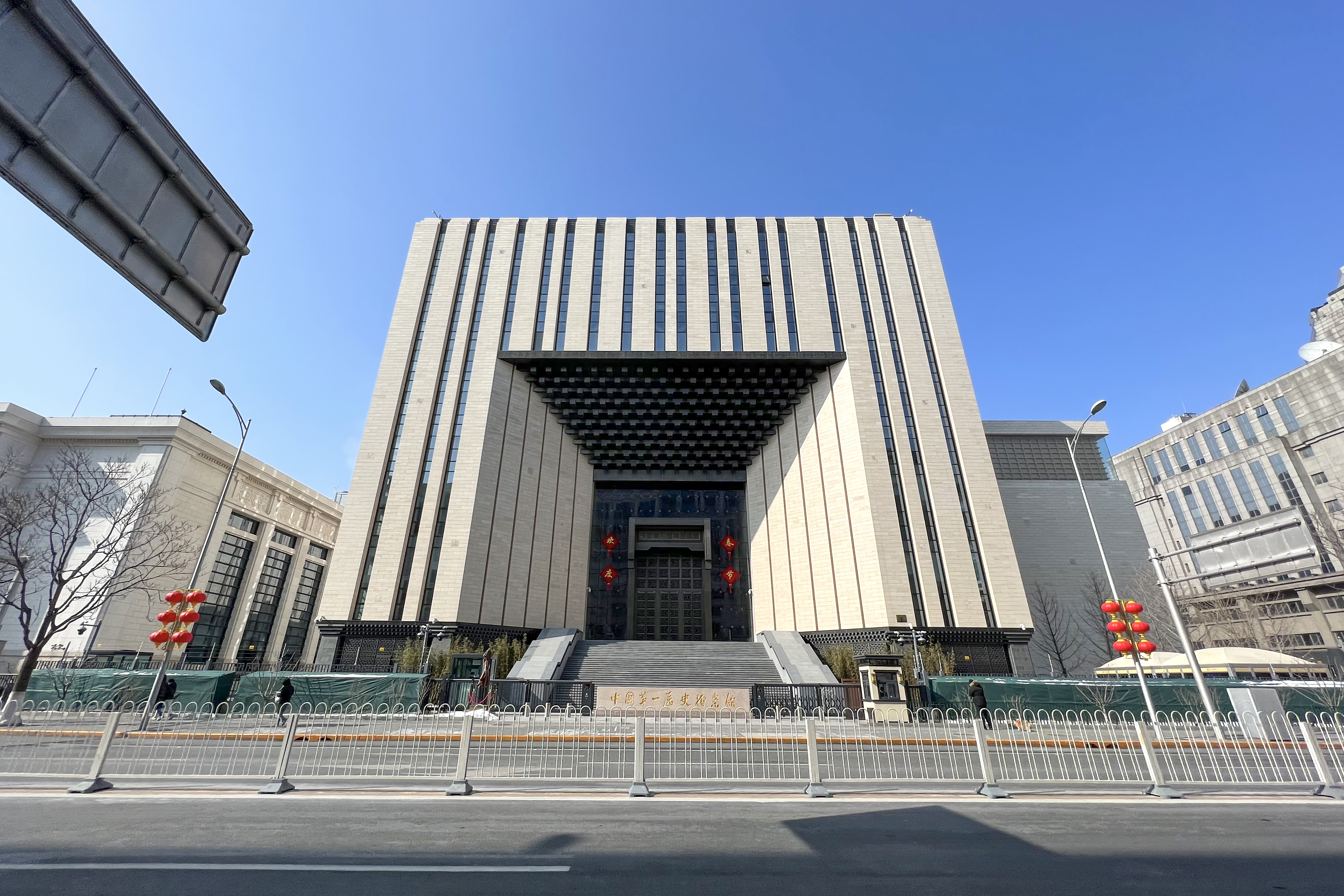
The First Historical Archives of China

Archives management is the area of management concerned with the maintenance and use of archives. It is concerned with acquisition, care, arrangement, description and retrieval of records once they have been transferred from an organisation to the archival repository. Once records have been selected and transferred to archival custody, they become archives.

== Managing archives ==
The steps involved in managing archives include acquiring and receiving from the office of the origin, arranging and describing according to archival principles and practices, providing easy retrieval and access to archives.

== Archives and accessibility ==
An increasingly relevant aspect of archives management is ensuring the accessibility of archives and archive materials to all users regardless of physical ability. Most archivist and library associations now include resources on educating archivists on how to manage their archives to be more accessible. Both archivists and special collections librarians are faced with the issue of making their resources more accessible to the public, as their items were created prior to the consideration of accessibility.

== See also ==
- Collections management
- Records management
