= Curation =

Curation may refer to:

== Activities ==
- Algorithmic curation, curation using computer algorithms
- Content curation, the collection and sorting of information
- Data curation, management activities required to maintain research data
- Digital curation, the preservation and maintenance of digital assets
- Evidence management, the indexing and cataloguing of evidence related to an event
- Cultural heritage management, conservation of cultural sites and resources

== People who perform curation ==
- Curator, manager or interpreter, traditionally of tangible assets of a library or museum
- Biocurator, professional scientist who maintains information for biological databases

== See also ==
- Curate, office and person holding it
- Archive, an accumulation of historical records
