= Collection manager =

Professional role in a cultural institution

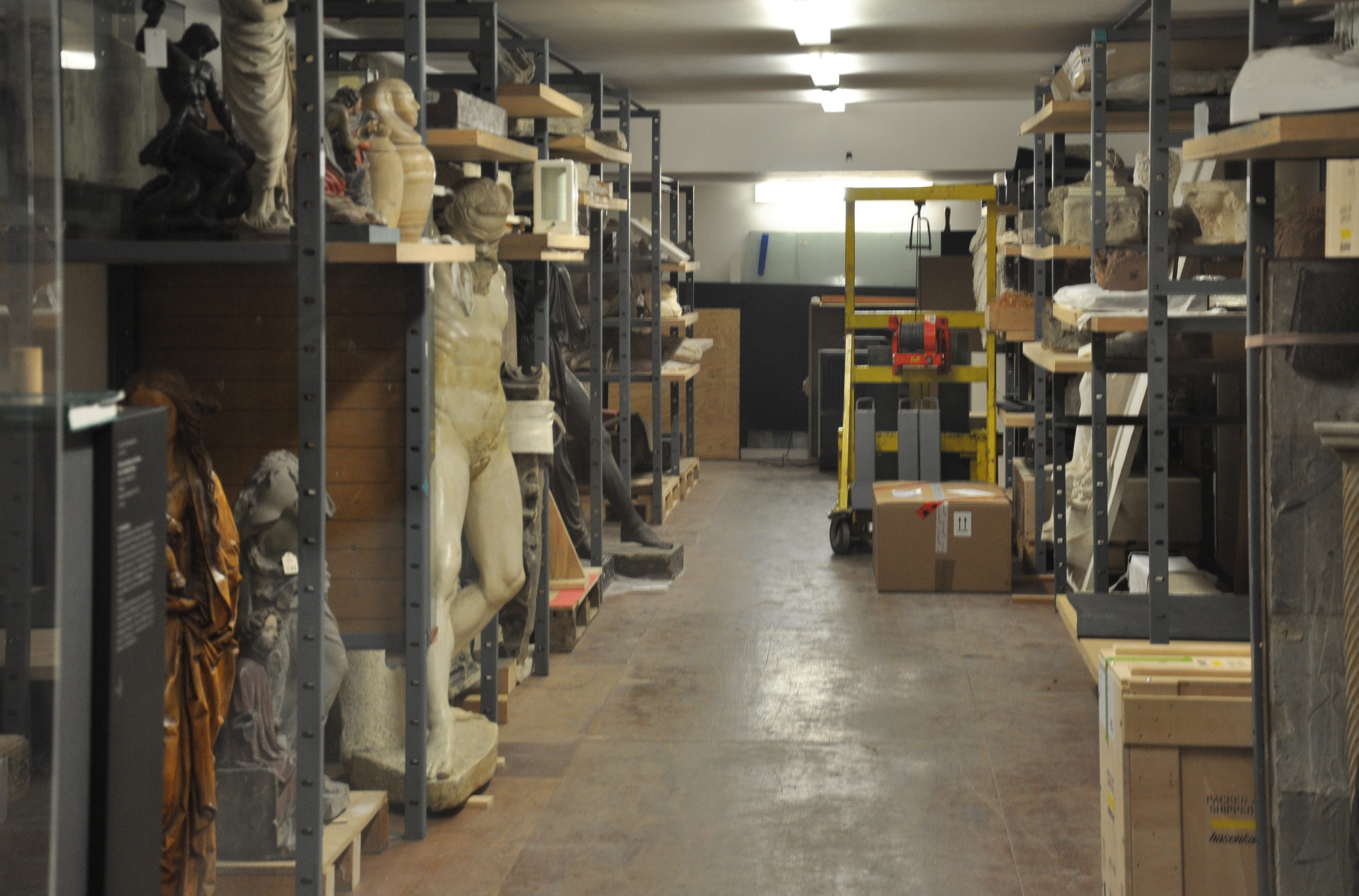
Liebieghaus Depot collection storage

A collection manager ensures the proper care and preservation of objects within cultural institutions such as museums, libraries, and archives. Collection managers, along with registrars, curators, and conservators, play an important role in collections care. Collection Managers and Registrars are two distinct collection roles that are often combined into one within small to mid-size cultural institutions. Collection Managers can be found in large museums and those with a history and natural history focus whose diverse collections require experienced assessment to properly sort, catalog, and store artifacts. A collection manager may oversee the registrar, archivist, curator, photographer, or other collection professionals, and may assume the responsibilities of these roles in their absence within an organization.

== Differences between collection managers and registrars ==
Collection managers are responsible for the long-term preservation of collections. They oversee the physical care of objects and form the hands-on problem-solving component of a collections team. Collection managers work collaboratively with registrars, who are document-oriented and responsible for risk management of the collection. Registrars maintain facility reports, contracts, and legal records associated with acquisitions, inventory, incoming and outgoing loans, shipping, and insurance. They must keep current with national and international regulations and procedures as they work with custom agents and brokers to acquire security, custom permits, insurance coverage, government indemnity, and requests for immunity from judicial seizure.

== Responsibilities and duties ==
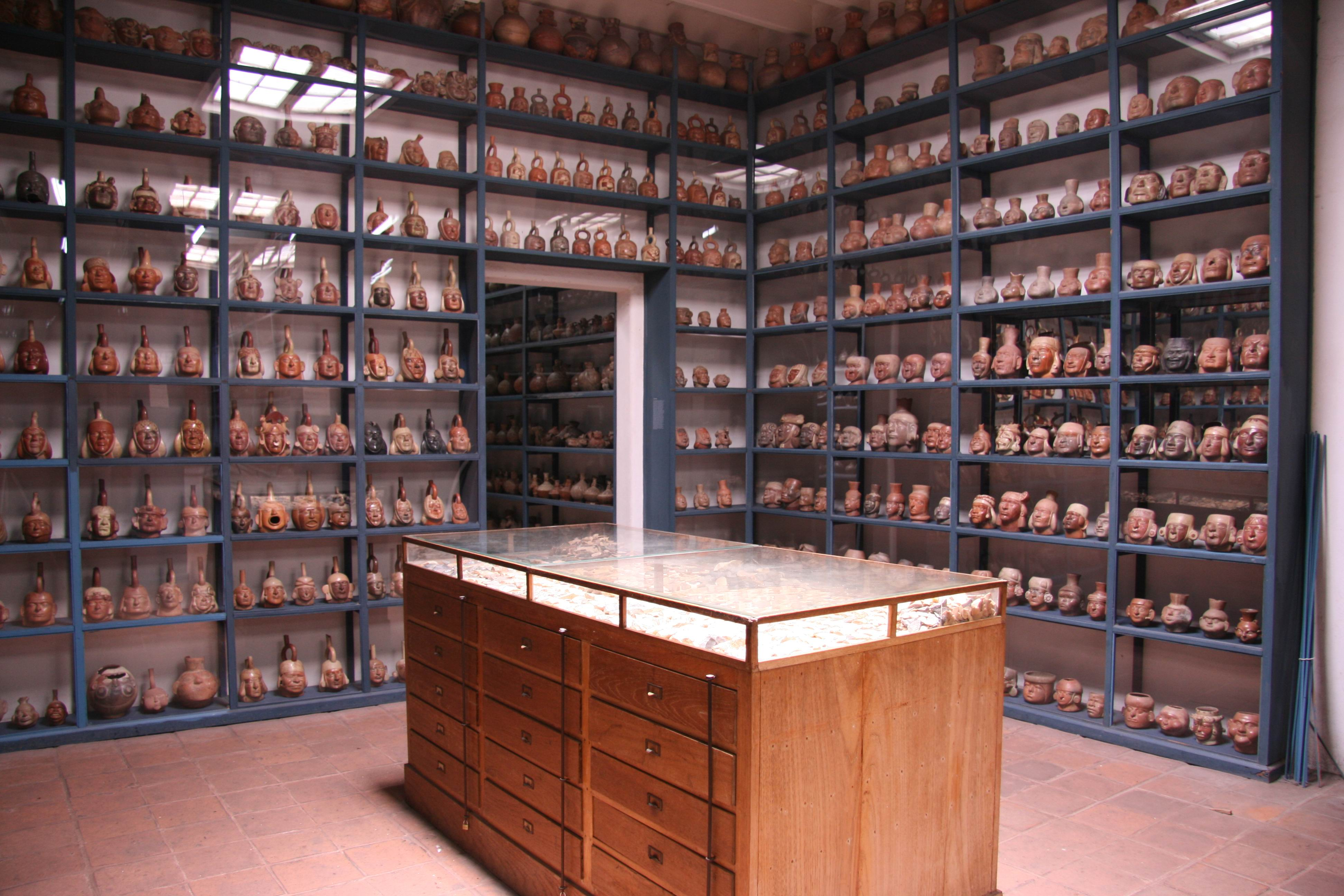
Storage of Peruvian ceramics at the Larco Museum

Collection managers work in cooperation with curators, registrars, conservators, art handlers, exhibit fabricators, mount makers, facilities managers, security, and housekeeping. They are responsible for establishing and maintaining high standards of collections care, from acquisition to conservation to display. Depending on the institution, collection managers may by tasked with drawing up a departmental budget, providing expenditure projections, and if necessary, raising funds in the form of grant writing.

- Acquisition: During acquisition consideration, the collection manager must research the object, determine its fit within the collection, ensure there are available resources for its care, and in the absence of a registrar, establish the object's provenance. Once acquired, the collection manager begins the accession process by carefully examining the object and classifying it based on the institution's specific guidelines. Classification terms are drawn from an ordered system of categories and can vary from one institution to another. The purpose of classification is to provide order within a collection by grouping objects with similar characteristics such as form, shape, material, function, use, or social context. The object is then given a unique identifying number, tying it to all related records. Next, the object is carefully measured, photographed, and described in a detailed condition report.
- Object Care: Proper collections care, or preventative conservation, is imperative to the welfare of objects by avoiding and minimizing deterioration and loss. Collection managers are responsible for proper object handling and for instructing/supervising other staff members, researchers, interns, and volunteers on proper procedures. They monitor the condition and environment of objects in storage and on exhibit, rotating sensitive objects off exhibit as needed. Collection managers clean and stabilize objects, select appropriate archival supplies, prepare objects for storage and exhibition, and pack and label objects for loan. Collection managers also design and prepare exhibit mounts for delicate objects on display and in storage. In an effort to best utilize storage space, collection managers may need to rehouse and relocate objects within and between museum facilities while closely tracking and documenting all object movement.
- Inventory: A key responsibility of collection managers is performing a detailed inventory of all items in their collection. Depending on the institution's collection management policy, a complete inventory can be taken every 5–10 years, with spot inventories performed annually.
- Exhibition: At the request of curators or borrowing institutions, the collection manager retrieves objects from storage and examines them for potential exhibition or loan consideration. After close examination and comparison with prior condition reports, a determination is made regarding the object's current condition, fragility level, special exhibition or shipping requirements, and/or need for conservation. Once objects have been cleared for exhibition or loan, the collection manager cleans and stabilizes them and ensures their safety by monitoring and/or assisting with the exhibit installation and deinstallation. Collection managers may also be tasked with interpretation and case selection.
- Database Management: Collection managers are responsible for documenting object information into their institution's database management system. The proper input and maintenance of this information is imperative. According to the National Park Service, "the information on the catalog records may be as important as the items themselves." The minimum amount of information entered into the database should be catalog number, accession number, nature of accession (e.g. gift, purchase), provenance, object name, classification, materials, dimensions, condition, and current location. Institutions utilize the catalog information to manage their collections, facilitate interdepartmental communications, and make collections available to researchers and the public. Museum Collection Management Software is determined by the size, collection type, and budget of the institution.
- Environmental Control: Dust, pests, light exposure, extremes and/or fluctuations in temperature and relative humidity can adversely affect objects. The collection manager, in conjunction with the facilities manager, is responsible for monitoring environmental controls, establishing and maintaining an integrated pest management system, coordinating a housekeeping routine, and ensuring the security of all objects within the building.
- Collection Management Policy: Collection managers assist with writing and updating collection care policies. An institution's collection is its greatest asset. As such, they have a legal, ethical, and fiduciary obligation to provide for its safekeeping. "Collection management policy is a detailed, written statement that explains why a museum is in operation and how it goes about its business." Collection management policy guides an institution's decision making and covers a range of topics including collection goals, methods of acquisition and disposal of objects, incoming/outgoing loan policies, care, control, and access to objects, insurance procedures, and record keeping. Some institutions also assign emergency management (disaster planning) responsibility to collection managers.

== Knowledge, abilities, and skills ==
There are specific skills, abilities, and areas of knowledge necessary for collection managers. All collection managers must be skilled in object handling, able to accurately identify objects, artifacts, and specimens within their institution's collection, and have knowledge of preventative conservation methods and procedures. It is essential that collection managers are educated about the organization, arrangement, and nomenclature of objects, artifacts, and specimens in their field of interest. Collection managers also need to be knowledgeable about collection management software for cataloging and record keeping.

== Education and training (experience) ==
Most institutions require collection managers to have an undergraduate degree in their specialty area such as art, history, or archeology. According to the Bureau of Labor and Statistics, from 2012 - 2022 archivists, curators, and museum workers "should expect very strong competition for jobs" with a projected growth rate of only 11 percent. In this competitive field, a master's degree in the institution's area of focus, museum studies, or library/information science is preferred.

Internships and volunteer work in libraries, museums, and archives is the best way to acquire hands-on collection management experience. Whether paid or unpaid, experience with object/artifact handling, processing, cataloging, preservation, packing, storage, inventory, fabrication, and collection management software is essential. Experience or training in conservation would be an added bonus, especially to small museums with limited resources.

== Professional organizations ==
There are numerous professional organizations of interest to collection managers and other museum professionals. These organizations provide opportunities to network, share information, and participate in continuing education.

- American Alliance of Museum (AAM)
- Association of Registrars and Collections Specialists
- Collections Trust
- Connecting to Collections
- Committee on Museum Professional Training
- CurCon
- Heritage Preservation
- International Council of Museums (ICOM)
- National Association for Museum Exhibition
- Preparation, Art Handling, Collections Care Information Network (PACCIN)
- PIC Green Network
- Registrars Committee of the Association of Museums (RCAAM)
- Society for the Preservation of Natural History Collections (SPNHC)
- SYNTHESYS
- Local and Regional Associations such as

- Texas Association of Museums (TAM)

== Related positions ==
In small to mid-size museums, collection managers might be referred to as "registrar," or the curator might be in charge of object care and record keeping.

== See also ==
- Collection (museum)
