= Collections management =

Process of overseeing a collection, including acquisition, curation, and deaccessioning

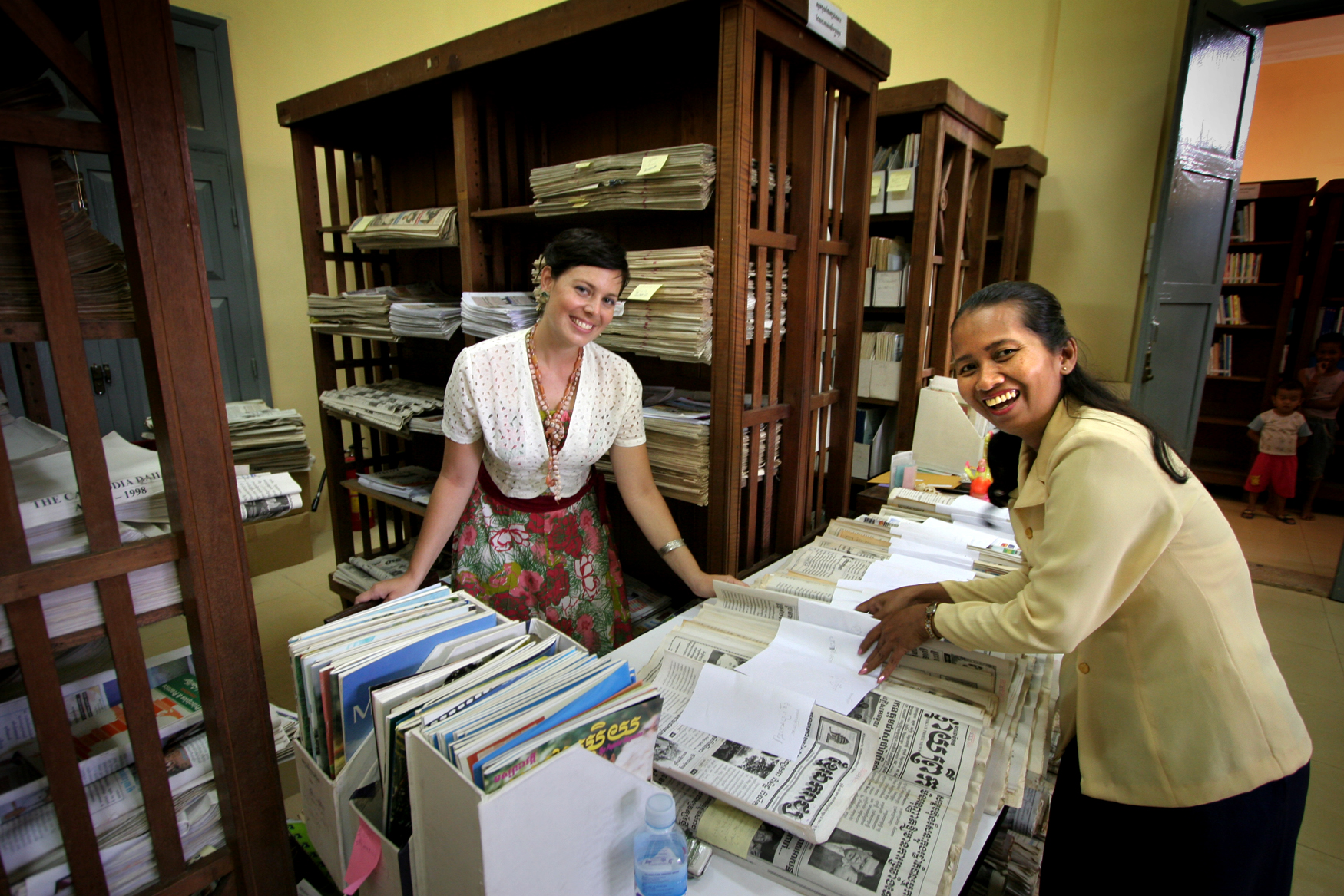
Volunteers sort and catalog a library collection at the National Library of Cambodia. Creating documentation of collections and providing safe storage conditions are important aspects of collections management.

Collections management involves the development, storage, and preservation of cultural property, as well as objects of contemporary culture (including contemporary art, literature, technology, and documents) in museums, libraries, archives and private collections. The primary goal of collections management is to meet the needs of the individual collector or collecting institution's mission statement, while also ensuring the long-term safety and sustainability of the cultural objects within the collector's care. Collections management, which consists primarily of the administrative responsibilities associated with collection development, is closely related to collections care, which is the physical preservation of cultural heritage. The professionals most influenced by collections management include collection managers, registrars, and archivists.

== Definition ==
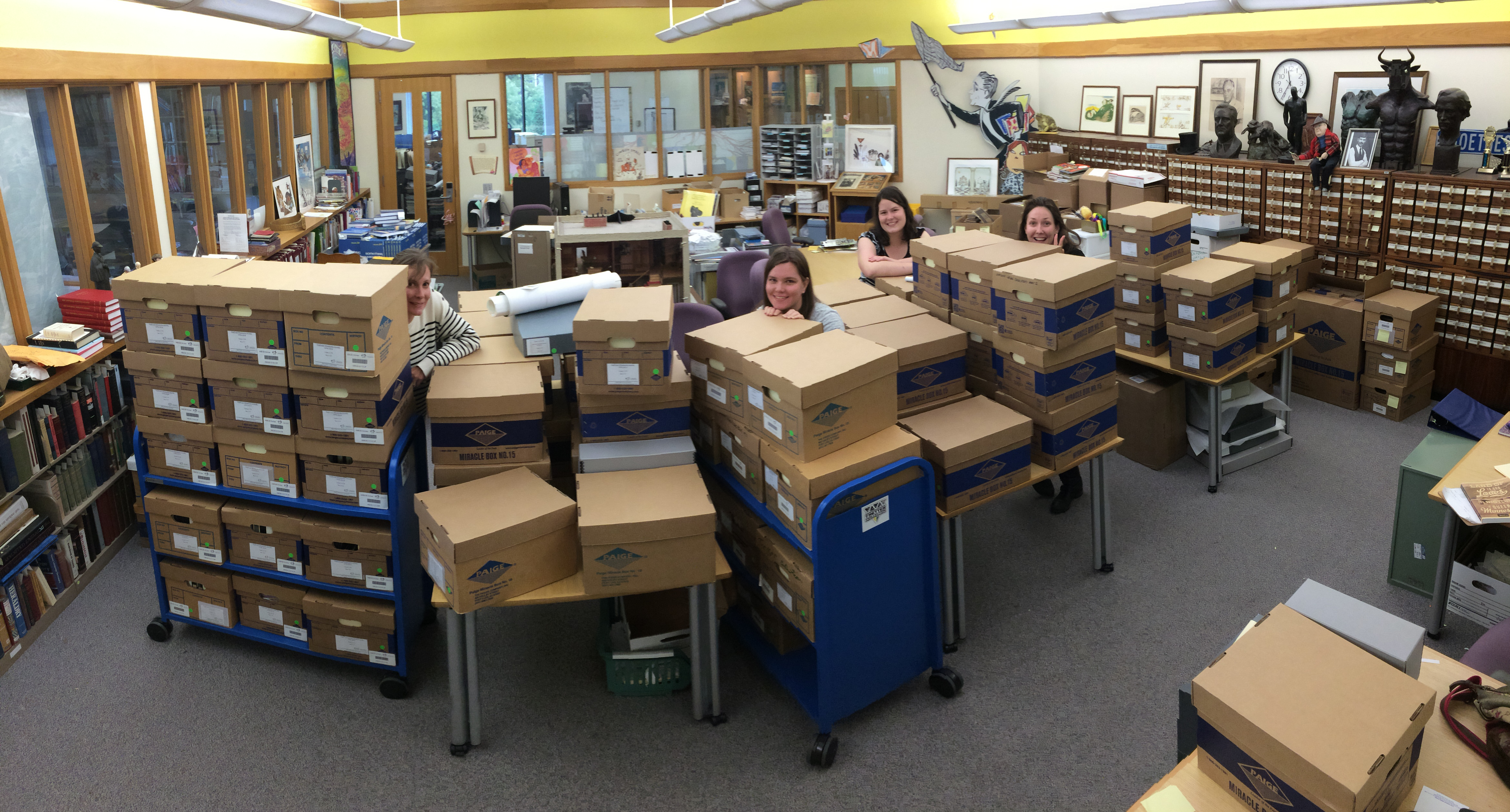
Jean-Nickolaus Tretter collection in Gay, Lesbian, Bisexual and Transgender Studies staff with the Outfront Minnesota Collection.

Cultural property collections require a great deal of care and protection in order to ensure their safety from external loss or damage, but they also require in-depth documentation to assist in tracking the life of the object within the holding institution. To accommodate these needs, collectors adhere to collections management and collections care standards and practices, which serve to create a safe environment for collection objects with clear and precise accompanying documentation. Where collections care addresses the physical actions necessary to prevent or delay damages of cultural heritage, collection management can be defined as "a process of information gathering, communication, coordination, policy formulation, evaluation, and planning." These processes influence decisions about records management and the collections management policy, which outlines protocols for the collection scope, collections care, and emergency planning and response.

== Collections management systems ==
Collection management systems (CMS) are software programs designed to aid in the archiving and cataloging of objects in a collection. Within libraries, archives, and museums. Although every CMS program is unique, there are several features that are considered standard:

- Cataloging: This feature includes fields for object identification purposes such as permanent identification numbers, object name, artist or creator name, object description, dimensions, object components and materials, condition, provenance, exhibition and preservation history, current location, and an image of the object.
- Acquisitions: This feature includes fields relevant to the donor and purchase history for the object such as date of acquisition, donor or seller name and contact information, the assigned accession number, purchase price, condition assessment at the time of arrival, and seller or donor restrictions, if applicable.
- Deaccessions: This feature addresses the removal of an object from a collection and includes information such as the date of deaccessioning, method of disposal used, and reason for removal.
- Loans: This feature is used for tracking information about incoming and outgoing loans to include lender name and contact information, special requirements, shipping instructions, associated insurance policies, and loan history.
- Condition and conservation reports: This feature includes condition assessments performed on objects, and the name of the inspector and date of inspection. This section also includes conservation reports detailing conservation-restoration treatments performed on the object.
- Security: This feature allows the database administrator to restrict access to the database by giving only specific individuals access to view and/or edit object records.
- Copyright: The copyright feature allows the institution to input relevant intellectual property restrictions for the objects in order to prevent illegal distribution or reproduction of the object.
- Multimedia: The multimedia feature is a function that allows digital materials such as image, video, and audio content associated with an object to be attached to the object record. This feature typically allows the input of associated metadata.
- QR Codes or Bar Codes: This feature allows for increased accuracy and efficiency, and streamlines location and inventory management.

=== Inventories ===
According to the Smithsonian Institution, a record is "any official, recorded information, regardless of medium or characteristics which are created, received, and maintained" by an individual collector or institution. As every object within a collection must have accompanying documentation, records management functions as the primary focus of collections management, and covers a wide range of documentation and policy standards. Topics covered under the umbrella of records management include collection information management systems, collections accession and deaccession policies, collection management policies, cataloging, and curation. The lack of appropriate record-keeping systems in museums compromises the security of museum collections and threatens the role of museums as information centers. Planned and systematized management of records improves programs and activities in museums, thereby leading to effective governance and operation of the museum.

=== Cataloging ===
Cataloging is the process of entering informational data about an object into a collection catalog or database. This process involves assigning unique identification numbers to individual objects within a collection, and attaching relevant accompanying documentation to the item such as curatorial worksheets, photographs, condition assessments, and accession and/or deaccession information. A catalog is meant to serve as a systematic written or digital record of every object within a collection, and should at the very least, include an object description that will allow for easy identification of an object.

Cataloging is an important aspect of collections management as it provides the individual records associated with each object within a collection. Should an object be lost or destroyed, the catalog entry can be utilized as a permanent record of the object and its data. For some collections, such as natural history collections, the catalog entry for an object or specimen also contains the scientific values and research information about the physical object, making maintenance of a catalog entry imperative for future research and education. Most modern collectors and institutions utilize CMS to streamline the catalog process. For this to be effective, data entry standards must be utilized for data structure, data values, and data content, which then "form the basis for a set of tools that can lead to good descriptive cataloguing, consistent documentation, shared records, and increased end-user access."

=== Curation ===
Curation can be defined as the collecting, organizing, preserving, and displaying of information about a specific object or collection topic. The role of curating is performed by individuals known as curators, who, in many cases, are trained as subject specialists. Curators conduct research on objects, offer guidance in the organization of a collection, and select objects to be utilized in exhibitions. Curation involves the development and design of exhibitions, typically based on objects within the collection, as well as the in-depth research and writing of materials associated with the collection.

==== Digital curation ====
Digital curation is an extension of content curation, and involves the collecting, preserving, and archiving of digital assets associated with digitized collections. Digital assets include both those items that originated in a digital form and are considered born-digital (i.e. websites, wikis, and digitally created sound and photographs), as well as analog items that have been digitized (i.e. cataloged in digital form, while still maintaining the original physical/analog form). Digital curation, like content curation, also involves the development and design of exhibitions based on objects within the collection, which in this case, often involves website maintenance for online exhibits.

Whether born-digital or digitized, many modern collections contain some form of digital collection content which must be maintained in much the same way as physical objects. Preservation of digital assets involves the creation of metadata to improve accessibility and object tracking, preventing technical obsolescence and data loss due to mismanagement, performing routine audits of technical software and digital catalogs to ensure data remains uncorrupted, applying authorization standards to protect data from unauthorized alterations, and managing content for the purposes of research and exhibition.

== Collections management policy ==
A collection management policy lays the foundation for how an institution handles situations pertaining to their collection. It can be defined as "a detailed written statement that explains why an institution is in operation and how it goes about its business. The policy articulates the institution's professional standards regarding the items left in its care and serves as a guide for the staff". Since institutions are often faced with questions that deal with what objects they should acquire, how to handle removing or loaning items in the collection, or standards of care for items; it is imperative to have a well-written policy that can help prevent possible issues on the institution's end. Prevention is the best approach when dealing with operations and objects in the collection, therefore the policy is an important document that can be looked at almost like boundaries set in place to help insure that the museum stays true to its mission while also providing the best care for the collection.

The primary focus of collections management is to document the standards and practices necessary to develop, care for, and make available for use, the collection objects within a collector or institution's care. To accomplish this, a collections management policy is created in which detailed information is provided to explain the specific needs of the collection based on type, age, location, etc. Collection management policies are specific to the collection-holding institution and these policies lay out terms such as which personnel are responsible for individual tasks involving the collection, if and when an object should be acquired for or removed from the collection, who within the institution has access to the collection, and the preventive care needs of each object within the collection.

Given that almost every decision a museum makes is done with its mission statement in mind, it is important that it is included in the policy. A mission statement addresses the museum's focus in terms of its purpose and its roles and responsibilities to the public and collections. This statement is what helps determine everything the museum does and should be referenced to on a regular basis to ensure that decisions are still in line with the museum's original goal. Museum mission statements should adhere to the standards of the American Alliance of Museums.

In addition to the mission statement, policies typically include a section that outlines the scope of the collection. This is a useful part of the policy that "reviews the history of the collection; considers its strengths, weaknesses, and current uses; and states what the museum does and does not collect" . The collections policy or selection criteria of a library, archive or museum collection is a statement of the institution's priorities as they apply to the acquisition of new materials. Collections policies guide the process of collection development.

Even the largest, best funded and most famous libraries (such as the Library of Congress, the British Library and Stanford University) cannot acquire, house, catalogue and maintain all works, so a policy or set of criteria is required for selecting which should be acquired. Generally collections policy is related to the mission or purpose of the library: for example national libraries collect materials related to that nation or published in that nation's territory, academic libraries generally collect materials used in teaching and research at the institution which they serve and public libraries collect materials which are expected to satisfy demands from the public they serve.

Sample collections policies include:

- Collections policy statements of the Library of Congress (organised by field)
- Collection policy statement of the B. Davis Schwartz Memorial Library at the Long Island University
- Collections policy of the National Library of New Zealand (integrated digital and physical policy)
- Collection and preservation policy for SunSITE (digital library)

As well as setting priorities for purchasing materials, collections policies also serve as a guide when libraries are offered gifts of materials or endowments. Acquisition of materials can be less costly than the processing (sorting, cataloguing, etc.) and long-term storage costs of many materials, and even free gifts to libraries usually have associated costs.

An institutions's policy may also look to include a history of the institution.

=== Legal and ethical considerations ===
In addition to general care standards, a collection management policy is also governed by the local and international legal restrictions placed on certain cultural heritage objects and the management needs associated with them. There are countless laws on the books that specify how antiquities, archaeological findings, and ethnic pieces must be handled and maintained to ensure their physical safety as well as the ethical considerations that these unique collection objects must address.

Examples of local laws within the United States of America include:

- Act for the Preservation of American Antiquities, June 8, 1906 ("The Antiquities Act") (16 USC 431–433): authorizes the president of the United States to declare national monuments, and enforces regulations protecting archaeological sites and excavated objects.
- Museum Properties Management Act of 1955, (16 USC, Sect. 18 [f]): explains the responsibilities and actions that may be performed by the United States secretary of the interior through the National Park Service to include accepting donations and bequests of money, purchasing museum objects and collections, making exchanges of museum objects or collections, and accepting and making loans of museum objects or collections.
- Native American Graves Protection and Repatriation Act of 1990(NAGPRA), (25 USC 3001–13): identifies ownership and control rights for Native American cultural items.

Examples of international legislation include:

- The Hague Convention for the Protection of Cultural Property in the Event of Armed Conflict, (adopted 14 May 1954): an international treaty focused on protecting cultural heritage such as architectural monuments, archaeological locations, works of art, and any objects deemed to have artistic, historic, or scientific significance.
- Convention on the Means of Prohibiting and Preventing the Illicit Import, Export and Transfer of Ownership of Cultural Property, (Paris, 14 November 1970): an international agreement to oppose the practices of illicit importing, exporting, and transferring of ownership of cultural property in order to better preserve the cultural property of the countries of the world.
- Convention for the Safeguarding of the Intangible Cultural Heritage, (Paris, 17 October 2003): an international agreement designed to safeguard intangible cultural heritage while also raising awareness and appreciation thereof. Intangible cultural heritage includes "the practices, representations, expressions, knowledge, skills – as well as the instruments, objects, artefacts and cultural spaces associated therewith – that communities, groups and, in some cases, individuals recognize as part of their cultural heritage."

=== Collections policy ===
Written as a subsection of the overarching collection management policy, most collectors and cultural institutions utilize a collections policy, or selection criteria policy, in which it is outlined what purpose the collection serves, and the types of objects that are considered most relevant. The collection policy lays out the scope of the collection and its relevance to the institution's mission statement by serving as "a broad description of the [institution's] collections and an explanation of how and what the museum collects and how those collections are used." The scope of the collection as laid on it in this policy serves to define if, when, and how a cultural institution chooses to accession or deaccession objects from its collection. Additionally, as different types of collections require unique care protocols, the collection policy also details the categories associated with the collection such as library or archive, education or research, permanent, and exhibit. The collection policy might also address conflicts of interest for employees who hold personal collections that are similar to those of the institution within which they are employed.

==== Accessioning ====
Accessioning can be defined as "the process of creating a permanent record of an object, assemblage, or lot received from one source at one time for which the [institution] has custody, right, or title, and assigning a unique control number to said object, assembly, or lot." As part of the collection scope policy, collectors and institutions must lay out acquisition terms to ensure only relevant objects are successfully accessioned into the collection. This portion of the policy discusses: who within the institution is authorized to make decisions on whether an object is acquired or not, under what legal terms the object is to be acquired (i.e. documentation proving legal purchase, import and export restrictions, and intellectual property rights), and repository agreement information if the object is to be stored within an offsite facility. The accessioning section of the collection policy might also discuss the strengths and weaknesses of the collection by examining the history of the collection as a whole. This in turn allows the collector or institution to set guidelines for improving, growing, and developing the collection in a way that is of most benefit.

==== Deaccessioning ====
Deaccessioning is the opposite of accessioning and involves the permanent removal of an object and all associated records from a collector's or institution's collection. Like the accession portion of the collection policy, the deaccession section lays out the terms under which an object may be considered for removal, as well as the individuals with the authority to approve the process. Additionally, this section lays out the legal restrictions associated with removal of the object, and the types of disposal that are appropriate based on the reason for the deaccession. There are many reasons that an object may be removed from a collection including:

- The object has been deemed no longer relevant to the collection-holder's mission or permanent collection scope.
- The condition of the object has deteriorated or been damaged to such an extent that the collection-holder cannot implement restoration repairs, or the object now poses a health risk for institution personnel.
- The institution no longer possess the means to maintain the object in an adequate environment due to financial or budgeting concerns, loss of personnel, lack of equipment, etc.
- The institution already possesses similar objects within the collection, which causes an unnecessary redundancy.
- The object has been deemed a fake or forgery, or not authentic and no longer relevant to the overall collection.
- The collection-holder is in a position in which deaccessioning an object will improve the quality of care and function of the remaining collection.

==== Loans and temporary custody of objects ====
Collectors and collecting institutions sometimes transfer objects to or from their collections for temporary periods of time as part of loan or temporary custody agreements. These loans help share and disseminate information to different communities and can prove mutually beneficial to both collection-holding individuals or institutions. Loans can occur for a variety of reasons and for policy purposes loans may be defined as: stationary or traveling exhibition loans, exchange loans, study loans, promised gifts, fractional-interest gifts (a "donor's remaining interest in a partial gift"), and long-term loans. The policies for loans may also be applied to acquisitions during the processing period, unsolicited objects until a return can be arranged, and collection objects or those objects found, abandoned, or unclaimed, in which ownership is unclear.

Within the collections scope section of a collections management policy, there is typically an area dedicated to discussing the procedures for loan approval and acceptance, associated acquisition fees, required documentation, specific insurance requirements, and monitoring instructions for the temporary holdings. This section may also include information about old loans and works with restrictions governing if and when they are allowed to leave the holding-institution. The loan policy should address both incoming and outgoing loans with thoroughly explained written procedures.

==== Risk assessment ====
Collections management focuses heavily on planning and response standards, and lays out these practices in documents detailing how staff responsible for the care of a collection should address the various hazards for the collection. A risk management plan or risk mitigation strategy is the section of the policy identifying potential hazards for the collection based on the region in which the collection is located, including fires, earthquakes, criminal activity, or flooding, in addition to damages from repairs, building failure, improper collections care, and neglect. To inform risk management plans, a significance assessment and a risk assessment or a collection condition assessment is conducted.

==== Preventive conservation ====
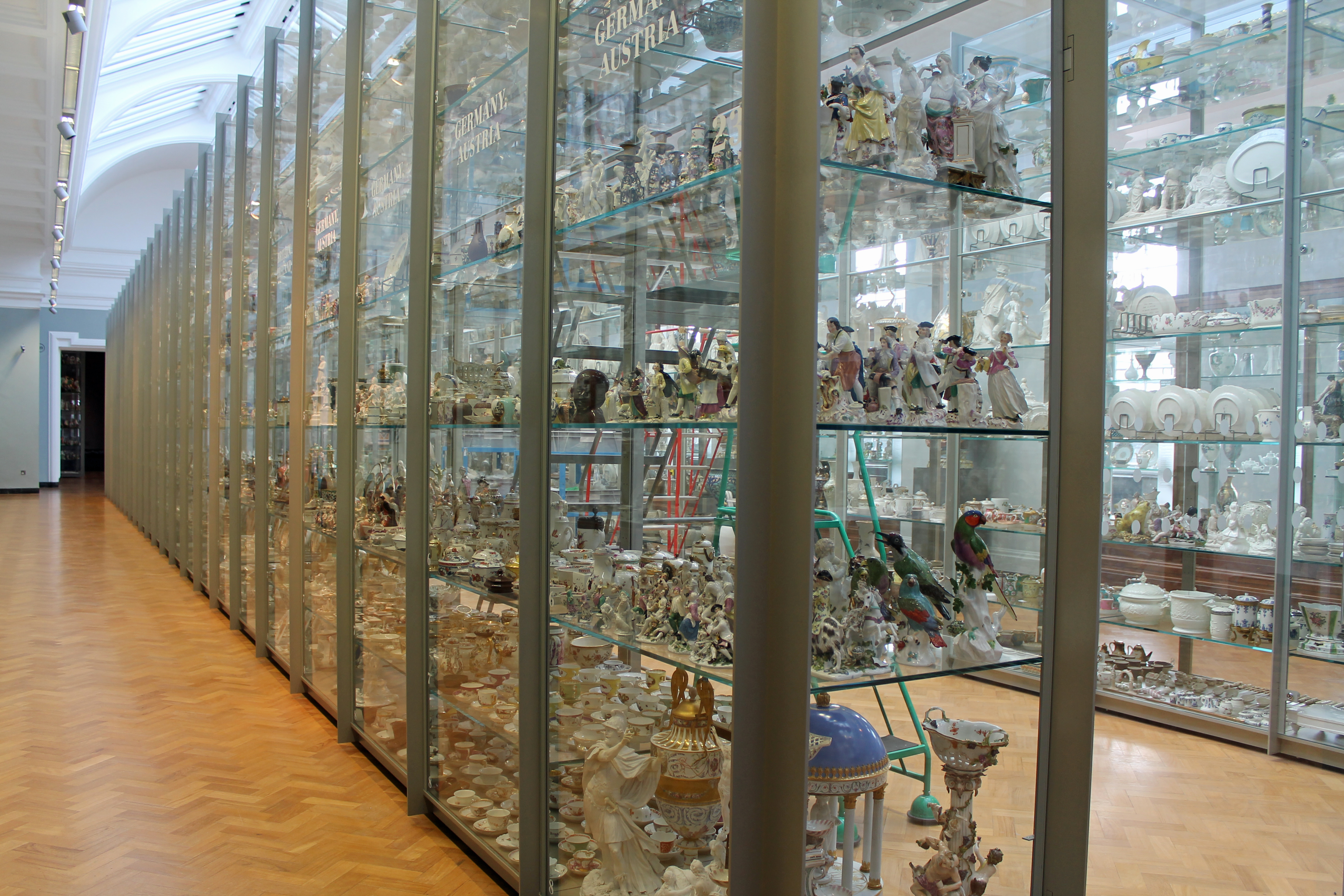
The visual storage facilities at the Victoria and Albert Museum in London, England.

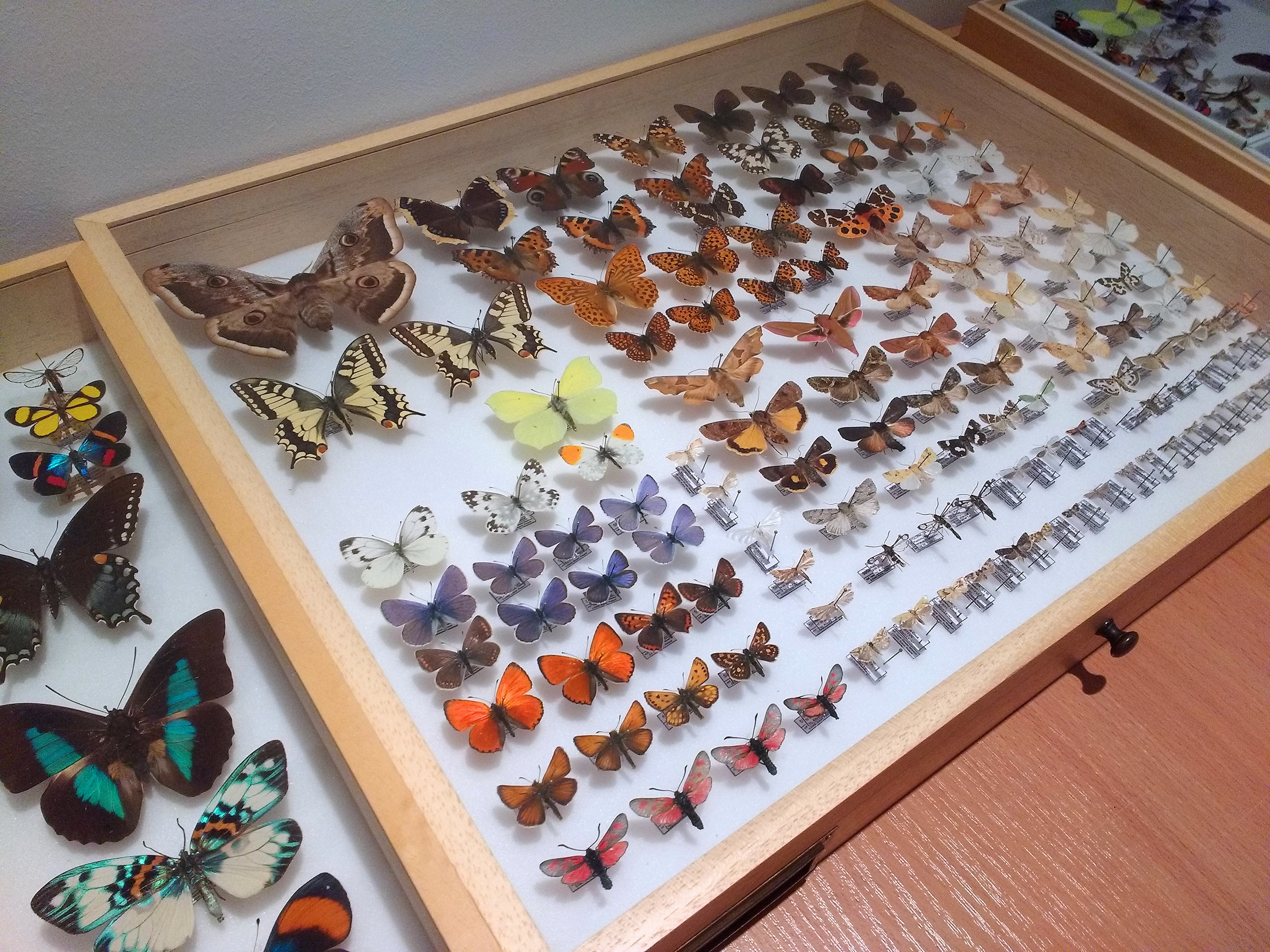
Insect specimen storage drawers in Upper Silesian Museum in Bytom, Poland.

Collections care can be defined as the physical preventive care measures taken to prevent damage or delay the natural deterioration of cultural heritage collection objects. These practices strive to provide enhanced safety for collections by minimizing damages from external sources such as improper handling, vandalism, climate changes, overexposure to light, and pests. A collections management policy carefully examines the preventive conservation needs of the individual objects within the collection, in order to provide practices and standards for how to mitigate threats, as well as the proper procedures for addressing issues as they arise. Sub-topics within this section may include display and storage housing, packing and transport, and integrated pest management.

===== Display and storage housing =====
When objects are held within a collection, either in storage or on display in an exhibit, the primary concern should be on the continued safety of the collection. To accomplish this, the collector or holding-institution must take into consideration proper housing containers, as well as environmental conditions necessary to prevent damages. The collections management policy for the collection should contain sections in which display and storage housing needs for the objects are addressed in full. Consultation with a conservator-restorer may be necessary to fully address these topics.

In terms of housing, solid structural design is vital in ensuring objects remain undamaged while stationary. This includes accounting for padding and support of the objects to prevent damage from bumps and snags, and stable display cases or mounts, which often requires collaboration with a mount maker to ensure proper creation and installation. Stands, shelves, drawers, and cases, in addition to fasteners, adhesives, papers, and foams, must all be chosen based on their compatibility with the structural design and materials of each individual object. The collections management policy should outline housing specifications such as the use of acid-free (pH neutral) and dye-free materials; types of enclosed cabinetry where available; appropriate coverings such as fabrics (e.g. unbleached muslin), polyethylene sheeting, and closed-cell foam (e.g. Ethafoam); containers made of paper, plastic, wood, or metal; enclosures such as folders or mats; and standards for frames, supports, and mounts.

The main environmental conditions that require outlined protocols in the collections management policy include temperature, relative humidity (RH), light, and contaminants. It is impossible to completely prevent natural deterioration of objects, but by carefully monitoring and implementing policies regarding environmental conditions, the effects of these conditions can be greatly reduced.

- Temperature: There is some flexibility allowed when addressing temperature, as it is impossible to control external weather. However, policy standards should aim to set temperature ranges that are optimized for the type of objects being preserved, the collector's or institution's energy and financial restrictions, as well as human comfort levels within both exhibit galleries and storage facilities.
- Relative humidity: Like temperature, RH standards, also allow for some fluctuations, although policies should take into account that excessive moisture or sudden dramatic shifts in relative humidity, can be harmful to almost all cultural heritage materials and may cause issues such as corrosion, mold growth, cracking, warping, or embrittlement.
- Light: There are two types of light- ultraviolet (UV) and visual light as perceived by the human eye- that need to be addressed within collections management and care. The effects of visual light exposure is cumulative, but visual light is necessary to view and safely handle objects within a collection, which means that standards should be established to limit time and intensity levels of visual light exposure, without risking visitor or staff safety. UV light, on the other hand, is not necessary for viewing or handling of collections, and as such should be eliminated as much as possible through the use of filters in order to prevent damage such as yellowing or disintegration.
- Contaminants: Contaminants can take a variety of forms such as gases, liquids, or solids, and they can pose threats not only to a collection, but also to those individuals that come in close contact with the pollutants. To ensure the safety of personnel and objects, it is necessary for a collection management policy to specify the proper methods for documenting and researching objects that are a risk for bringing contaminants into the collection, as well as explaining what precautions must be taken to prevent accidental contamination as the result of human error or the chemical breakdown of collection objects. Contaminated objects may show signs of disintegration, discoloration, or corrosion.

===== Packing and transport =====
Objects within a collection should ideally, be handled as little as possible since every time they are handled, they are at an increased risk of damage. Proper display and storage housing will help to mitigate some of the risks of accidental damage, but it is important to create and implement high standards for the routine care and handling, as well as the packing and transporting, of collection objects. It is extremely important to ensure that staff are aware of and educated on standard practices for handling objects such as hand washing protocols, the appropriate use of cotton or latex gloves, established practices for identifying structural weaknesses that may require special care, and the accepted modes of transportation of objects within the holding-institution (i.e. flatbeds, carts, tote pans, pads, and tissue papers).

Sometimes a collector or institution will have a need to move objects outside of exhibit and storage locations. The collection management policy, which discusses the proper procedures for loans and acquisitions, must therefore also address proper packing and transport protocols to ensure that the objects arrive at their destination safely. To ensure safe transport, safe handling techniques must be combined with individual packing requirements for the specific object being shipped. Ideally, the object will be packaged in a shipping container that provides protection from shock, vibration, sudden climate changes, and mishandling. Collection management policies will advise staff on how best to address issues such as "the object's fragility, the shipping method, the climate through which the objects will travel, and the climate at the object's destination." During the packing and transport process, it is likely that several departments within the shipping institution may contribute, and collaboration with the receiving institution must be arranged to provide policies for acclimatization and unpacking of the object once received.

===== Integrated pest management =====
Within the collections care section of a collections management policy, there is typically a section dedicated to integrated pest management (IPM). This section covers the policies related to the prevention and suppression methods of various types of pests typically found within collections. IPM focuses on utilizing non-pesticide prevention and treatment techniques in order to minimize health risks for personnel as well as damages to the collection itself. Examples of types of pests that should be addressed include "insects, mold, mice, rats, birds, and bats."

The collection management aspect of IPM involves creating and implementing policies for the routine inspection of objects and housing facilities, authorized trapping procedures, and documentation of all inspections or trapping programs utilized within the facility. These policies are called cultural controls, and the physical techniques utilized as part of the collections care are known as mechanical controls. Specific cultural controls that may be documented within the collections management policy include:

- Standards for the inspection of all new materials to be brought into collection areas including new acquisitions and loans, and storage or packing materials.
- Defined practices for daily collections maintenance and general housekeeping of collection-holding facilities.
- Restrictions on areas within the building where food, drinks, and smoking are allowed and prohibited.
- Documentation showing the careful monitoring of plants placed around the outside of the building, with special attention paid to the proximity of live plants and mulch to the building, in addition to banning live and dried plants within the building.
- Policies for standard collections care including relative humidity, and storage and housing guidelines.

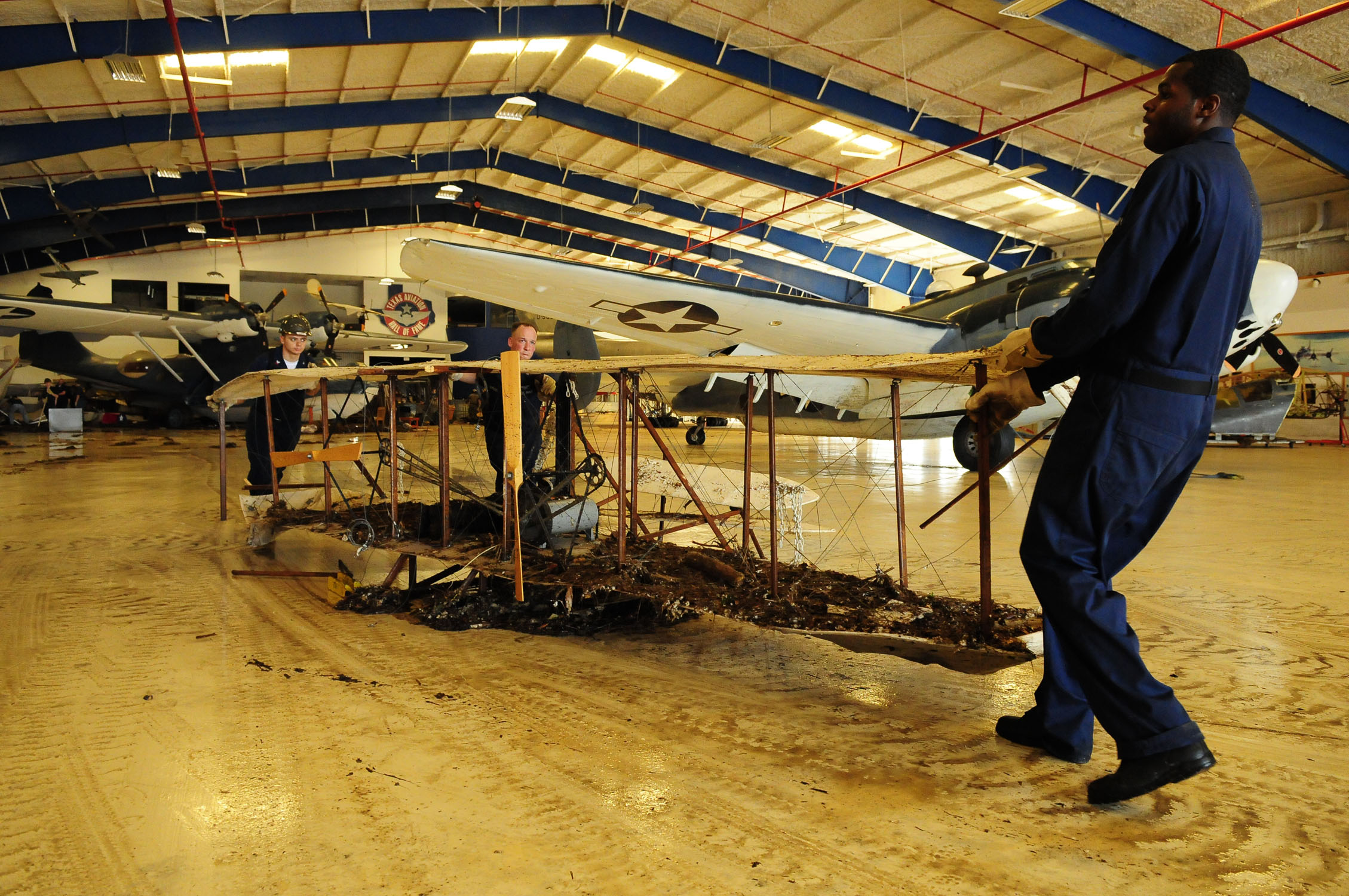
U.S. Navy personnel move a damaged antique plane from the Lone Star Flight Museum during disaster recovery after Hurricane Ike in Galveston, Texas, September 21, 2008.

==== Security policy ====
Physical security systems for protected facilities are generally intended to:

- deter potential intruders (e.g. warning signs, security lighting and perimeter markings) = risk prevention;
- detect intrusions and monitor/record intruders (e.g. intruder alarms and CCTV systems) = risk mitigation; and
- trigger appropriate incident responses (e.g. by security guards and police) = emergency preparedness.

It is up to security designers, architects and analysts to balance security controls against risks, taking into account the costs of specifying, developing, testing, implementing, using, managing, monitoring and maintaining the controls, along with broader issues such as aesthetics, human rights, health and safety, and societal norms or conventions.

==== Emergency management ====
Created in conjunction with the collection management policy, most collecting institutions will also possess a disaster preparedness and emergency response policy that outlines what procedures should be taken to prevent injury or loss of life for all personnel and building visitors, as well as how to minimize damages or loss to the collection. The plan should outline protocols for how to handle a disaster, starting with the chain of command within the emergency response team, as well as the individual responsibilities of each member of the staff. The emergency response team will include a managing official responsible for notifying other members of the team of a disaster and overseeing the implementation of the emergency response tasks. These staff members are typically trained in proper collection handling protocols. The disaster preparedness and emergency response plan should also include detailed instructions explaining how each type of disaster should be handled including the initial threat assessment and response, evacuation procedures where appropriate, damage mitigation plans, salvage priorities, and post-damage inventories and recovery procedures.

==== Sustainability policy ====
Sustainability is defined as the use, development and protection of resources to meet both current and future generation needs. Collection sustainability policies are collection or institution specific, as they balance the collections economic and social context against the collections environmental impact, while ensuring compliance with local and national legislation. A sustainability action plan is used to identify unsustainable practices, outline a target goal and completion timeframe, and assign responsibilities. Sustainability policies and sustainability action plans consider sustainability through the lens of; economic resource use, when considering cost-benefit of collection storage, staffing, procurement, maintenance and waste processes; social capital, when ensuring representational parity through community engagement and advocacy of stakeholders; and environmental impact, when emphasizing waste reduction, life cycle assessments and environmentally safer alternatives to conservation chemicals, packaging and transport materials.

Sample sustainability policies include:

- Sustainability action plan of the Australian Museum
- Sustainability policy of the Museum of Contemporary Art (Australia)
- Sustainability Policy of the Science Museum Group
- Environmental Policy of the National History Museum

== See also ==
- Archives management
- Fonds
- Collection (museum)
- Conservation-restoration
- Conservator-restorer
- Cultural heritage management
- Curator
- Digital preservation
- Disaster recovery plan
- Object conservation
- Preservation (library and archive)
