= Accession number (cultural property) =

Object identifiers used in galleries, libraries, archives, and museums

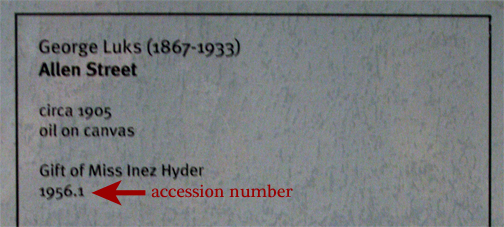
Label in a gallery indicating the object's accession number.

In galleries, libraries, archives, and museums, an accession number or catalogue number, or various other terms, is a unique identifier assigned to each object in a collection for its identification and recording. Assignment of accession numbers typically occurs at the point of accessioning, when the object enters the collection, or sometimes in later cataloging.

"Accession number" tends to be the term in American collections, while a variety of other terms are used in other English-speaking countries. If an item is removed from the collection, its number is usually not reused for new items.

== In libraries ==
In libraries, this numbering system is usually in addition to the library classification number (or alphanumeric code) and to the ISBN or International Standard Book Number assigned by publishers. Some libraries call their numbers shelfmarks.

== In botany ==
Accession numbers are also used in botany, by institutions with living collections like arboreta, botanic gardens, etc., to identify plants or groups of plants that are of the same taxon, are of the same propagule type (or treatment), were received from the same source, were received at the same time. Herbaria and other botanic institutions collecting non living material also use accession numbers.

== In museums ==
An accession number may include the year acquired, sometimes the full date (as at the British Museum), and a sequential number separated by a period. In addition, departments or art classifications within the collection or museum may reserve sections of numbers. For example, objects identified by the numbers 11.000 through 11.999 may indicate objects obtained by the museum in 1911; the first 300 numbers might be used to indicate American art, while the next fifty (11.301–350) might be used for African art. In some cases, they also include letters and other punctuation, such as commas, hyphens or slashes.

== Uses with other parallel systems ==
In older institutions, simpler numbering systems are sometimes maintained alongside, or incorporated within, newer systems. Where the objects are unique, institutions normally need to retain the original number in some form as it will have been used in old references that are still of use in scholarship. In particular, collections of manuscripts use the prefix "MS", and many well known manuscripts are known by their old MS numbers, often incorporating a prefix for a particular collection within a library. These collections may be divided by former owners, as with several British Library "closed" collections, or by language, as with Froissart of Louis of Gruuthuse (BnF MS Fr. 2643-6), indicating a two volume manuscript in French at the Bibliothèque nationale de France.

== See also ==
- Accession number (bioinformatics)
- Universally unique identifier
- Library of Congress Control Number
