= Sheldon and Caroline Keck =

Two art conservators and educators

Sheldon Waugh Keck (May 30, 1910 - June 12, 1993) and Caroline Martin Kohn Keck (October 6, 1908 - December 17, 2007) were American paintings conservators. Married in 1933, they contributed to the development of techniques in the conservation and restoration of paintings during the 20th century.

== Early lives, education and marriage ==
Sheldon Waugh Keck was born on May 30, 1910, in Utica, NY, son of Fred R. and Myra Waugh Keck. With support from a scholarship, Keck received his initial education and training in the arts at Harvard University (1932), receiving a BA in art history. He was a student of Paul J. Sachs, and served a year-long apprenticeship as an art conservator at the Fogg Art Museum, under the supervision of innovative painting restorer R. Arcadius Lyon.

Caroline Martin Kohn Keck was born on October 6, 1908, in New York, daughter of Albert and Laura Underhill Kohn. She graduated from Vassar College in 1930 with a degree in History, continuing at Radcliffe College with a Master’s Degree in art history. She began work on a doctorate at the University of Berlin in 1934, but was forced to return to the US after the Nazi party took control of the German government.

The couple met in 1933 in Cambridge, Massachusetts when they both were students in the "Methods and Processes in the Fine Arts" art materials course, taught at the Fogg Art Museum (today part of the Harvard Art Museums) by its director Edward Forbes. They married on October 31, 1933.

== Art conservation careers ==
=== Sheldon Keck ===
In 1934, Sheldon was appointed the first paintings restorer for the staff at the Brooklyn Museum, New York (1934). In April 1935, the Brooklyn Museum Quarterly published Sheldon's report detailing his first completed treatment at the Museum, the beginning of a lengthy series of publications and lectures sharing techniques in art conservation. Sheldon Keck was apparently among the first in the US to use medical x-ray technology in the examination, conservation analysis and authentication of paintings, employing a Metalix portable device - the first of its kind - manufactured by Philips.

By 1943, US President Franklin Roosevelt had created the second of two Roberts Commissions, in this case with the specific charge to collaborate with the War Department in the protection of cultural treasures impacted by the war in Europe. Activities conducted under the Commission included documentation of damage to cultural property and its appropriation by the Axis Powers, was well as the restitution of these treasures. Sheldon Keck had enlisted in the U.S. Army that July. His experience in art restoration (and his relationship with Paul Sachs, by then director of the Fogg Museum and a member of the Commission), lead to Keck being selected for service with the Monuments, Fine Arts, and Archives program (MFAA). Keck's deployment overseas was delayed until 1945, when he was sent to work under the U.S. Ninth Army in the area around Aachen, Germany. Keck accompanied others in the MFAA in surveys of the region's cities, towns, churches, etc., occasionally entering the combat zone. Later, Keck was assigned to the MFAA's Central Collecting Point in Marburg, where he examined seized Nazi documents for evidence of further looting throughout north Central Europe. Ultimately, Keck was instrumental in the restitution of works belonging to some of Europe's most prominent private collections.

Once Sheldon returned from Europe, he and Caroline became firmly established as conservators, serving some of the most prominent collections and museums. Perhaps most prominent among these projects was repair and conservation analysis of Picasso's Les Demoiselles d'Avignon, which had been damaged while on exhibit at New York's Museum of Modern Art in 1948.

=== Caroline Kohn Keck ===
Caroline Keck graduated from Vassar College in 1930 with a degree in History, continuing at Harvard University with a Master’s Degree in art history, received in1931.

She began work on a doctorate at the University of Berlin in 1934, mainly focusing on the artist Stephan Lochner. However, she was forced to return to the US once the Nazi party had taken control of the German government. In addition, some of her nicknames are "UNsweet old lady" and "hazmat", as she expressed by herself in a letter she wrote in February 2007.

Caroline maintained the functions of the Brooklyn Museum's restoration lab during Sheldon's deployment to Europe. In addition, her husband, Sheldon Keck worked as a conservator at the Museum from 1934 to 1961. In 1944, Caroline restored the Charles Willson Peale's 1776 portrait of General George Washington.

Between them, the Kecks were prolific authors of works on art conservation, art security and cultural resources practices. During the 1960s and 1970s, Caroline published six different volumes she produced on these topics.

Caroline served as President of the FAIC from 1981 to 1985. With Caroline's support and advice, in 1990 the University of Delaware's art conservation department began offering doctoral degrees, the first program of its kind in the US, which by 2005 had evolved into a PhD program in Preservation Studies (PSP).

Through the years, the Kecks were known for their contrasting personalities: Sheldon quiet and contemplative, Caroline rather boisterous and at times combative. Caroline was regarded as quite assertive when it came to standards and practice in conservation, and late in her career had a fairly prominent dispute with art historian John Richardson. The dispute centered on restorative treatments of Cubist works, efforts which some artists (Picasso, in particular) apparently opposed. Based on MoMA records, the Kecks were involved in an application of varnish to Les Demoiselles d'Avignon.

Caroline Keck's more notable clients included American portraitist and representational painter Edwin Dickinson, the collection of Nelson A. Rockefeller, and Georgia O'Keeffe. Keck and O'Keeffe met in 1946, and from that point Caroline served as personal conservator for the artist for almost 40 years. While O'Keeffe's techniques tended to be closely guarded by the artist, her correspondence with Caroline Keck reveals in considerable detail the methods and materials O'Keeffe employed. Conversely, conservation projects where Caroline treated O'Keeffe works serve to reveal the impacts that time, materials selection and handling had on the artist's pieces.

=== Shared impact ===
The Kecks were considered to be pioneers in the scientific approach to the conservation of paintings and art works in general. For centuries, art restoration had emphasized repair and replacement for works that had experienced losses and other damage, with the purpose of renewing the appearance of a work; an approach that unfortunately often resulted in significantly - and even irreparably - altering a piece.

The Kecks helped bring professional standards to the practice, emphasizing the sharing of technique and methodologies over the maintenance of trade secrets. They also stressed thorough documentation of the procedures applied to each work, with the intent that any changes made could be understood and readily reversed. From 1934 to 1961, the Kecks operated a laboratory and studio at their residence in the State Street neighborhood [1] of Brooklyn, New York, becoming involved in the training of numerous conservators and consulting for many of the nation's most prominent art museums.

Over the decades, the Kecks' approach to the methods and skills of conservation was featured in exhibitions, including:

- "The Examination and Conservation of Works of Art" at the Brooklyn Museum curated by Sheldon Keck, with John I.H. Baur, Curator of Contemporary Art (1938)
- “Take Care” at the Brooklyn Museum (1954)
- “Exposition of Painting Conservation” (1962) also at the Brooklyn Museum.

In addition, an exhibition of American-owned French artworks - coordinated and curated by Sheldon Keck - entitled "De David à Toulouse-Lautrec", opened at the Musée de l'Orangerie in Paris in 1955.

In 1950, the Kecks became charter "Fellows" of the International Institute for Conservation of Historic and Artistic Works (IIC), an organization founded by George L. Stout, Harold Plenderleith, Wallace Akers, Paul Coremans and others. Sheldon served for two terms as president of the organization - from 1974 to 1980 - and chaired a panel of conservators from the IIC's American Group in developing the first code of ethics for the field of conservation.

In 1960, Sheldon and Caroline Keck founded the Conservation Center at the New York University Institute of Fine Arts, often cited as "the oldest graduate degree-granting conservation program in the world". A collaborator on the project was Craig Hugh Smyth, one of Sheldon's colleagues from the MFAA and at that time University Institute's Director. Sheldon Keck served as director of the Conservation Center until 1965.

Under the auspices of UNESCO in 1969 the Kecks established the Latin American Center for Conservation of Cultural property in Mexico City, a formal training program for Mexican art conservators as well as international participants.

In 1974 the Kecks established a successor program to the Center they created at the Institute of Fine Arts, this time in Cooperstown, NY. In affiliation with the State University of New York at Oneonta and the New York State Historical Association, the program became known as the Cooperstown Graduate Program in the Conservation of Historic and Artistic Works.

In 1975, the Kecks received the New York State Award for their contributions to art preservation.

In 1976, the Kecks received honorary degrees from Hamilton College.

In 1978, Caroline Keck became the first woman to deliever the IIC Forbes Prize lecture.

In 1983, this program was transferred to Buffalo State University in Buffalo, NY.

In 1984, the Kecks once again, received the Katherine Coffey Award for distinguished accomplishments in the museum profession.

Continuing their support for advanced education in art conservation, the Kecks helped found yet another graduate program, this time a collaboration between the University of Delaware and the Winterthur museum. Presently known by the anagram "WUDPAC", the program began in 1974.

In 1993, the Keck Award was initiated by the American Institute for Conservation (AIC), presented annually to individuals demonstrating a "sustained record of excellence in the education and training of conservation professionals".

In 1987, using the money from the sale of a Georgia O’Keeffe painting from their personal collection, the Kecks set up a fund for the Foundation of the American Institute for Conservation (FAIC), the earnings from which support the operations, conservation education, research, and outreach activities of the FAIC and AIC

== Deaths ==
Sheldon Keck died on June 12, 1993 in Cooperstown, NY. Caroline Keck died on December 17, 2007, also in Cooperstown. Together, they left their library and archives to the Univ. of Delaware/Winterthur program, and to the University's Paul Coremans Endowment Fund in Art Conservation.

Their descendants included two sons: Lawrence Waugh Keck and Albert Keck. Following his undergraduate degree, Albert worked for a number of years as an art conservator. He eventually became a special education teacher in Boston, MA and ultimately returned to Cooperstown in 1990 to care for his ailing parents.

== Awards and recognition ==
Sheldon Keck

- Fulbright Fellow (1959
- Guggenheim Fellow (1960)

Jointly:

- New York State Award (1975) for contributions to art preservation
- American Association of Museums Katherine Coffey Award (1984) for distinguished accomplishment in the museum profession

Dedications:

- Sheldon and Caroline Keck Award (AIC) for "a sustained record of excellence in the education and training of conservation professionals.”
- Keck Award (IIC) to an "individual or group...for promoting understanding and appreciation for the accomplishments of the conservation profession"

== Publications ==
- A Future for the Past (1954) a film on art conservation featured within the "Take Care" exhibition; considered among the first uses of moving images within a museum gallery setting.
- Hidden Life of a Painting Keck, Caroline. Audiovisual collection, Brooklyn Museum Archives, Brooklyn, NY. (1962)
- Exposition of Painting Conservation: materials--methods--machines Keck, Caroline. Exhibition catalog; Brooklyn Museum (1962).
- How to Take Care of Your Pictures: A Primer of Practical History. Keck, Caroline. The Brooklyn Museum (1965); republished as How to Take Care of Your Paintings by Scribners in 1978.
- A Primer on Museum Security. Keck, Caroline. New York State Historical Assoc. (1966)
- Safeguarding Your Collection in Travel Nashville: American Association for State and Local History (1970)
- A Handbook on the Care of Paintings: For Historical Agencies and Small Museums. Keck, Caroline. American Association for State and Local History (1974)

== See also ==
- Albert Pinkham Ryder: Painter of Dreams. W.I. Homer (1961); Sheldon Keck assisted with the analysis and authentication of works attributed to Ryder.
- After the Hunt: William Harnett and other American still-life painters. (1953). Sheldon Keck assisted Alfred Frankenstein with the analysis and authentication of works attributed to William Harnett and John Frederick Peto.
- The Heights Couple Who Made Art Shine Like New:Sheldon and Caroline Keck Helped Improve the Craft of Restoration. Portell, Jean. Brooklyn Eagle (2011).
