= Elisabeth West FitzHugh =

Conservation scientist (1926–2017)

- Born: 1926; Beirut
- Died: 2017 (aged 90–91); Mitchellville
- Alma mater: University of London; Vassar College
- Employer: Freer Gallery of Art (1956–2011)
- Position held: research associate (1991–2011), conservation scientist, analytical chemist

Elisabeth West FitzHugh (born July 30, 1926 – January 13, 2017) was a Lebanese American conservation scientist. She was a fellow of the American Institute for Conservation and the International Institute for Conservation.

== Early life and education ==
Elisabeth West FitzHugh (née Hebard West) was born on July 30, 1926, in Beirut, Lebanon, where her father William A. West was a professor of Chemistry. She attended primary school there at the American Community School Beirut. She was an undergraduate student in chemistry at Vassar College. After earning her bachelor's degree, she moved to the UCL Institute of Archaeology (then University of London), where she earned a master's degree in the Archaeology of Western Asia. During her studies, she worked as an assistant curator and librarian at the American University of Beirut. She visited the Oriental Institute on an archaeological expedition in October 1950. On returning to the United States, FitzHugh met with George M. A. Hanfmann, then curator of the Fogg Art Museum, to discuss her career. He recommended that she speak to Rutherford John Gettens at the Smithsonian Institution.

== Career ==
FitzHugh was appointed to the technical research team at the Freer Gallery of Art in 1956. She worked alongside Gettens to establish a technical scientific laboratory at the art gallery, creating the protocols for the analysis of materials and pigments. Specifically, she developed the laboratory procedures to better understand the Chinese bronzes. This involved wet chemistry approaches and emission spectroscopy. FitzHugh had access to primitative characterization equipment at the Freer Gallery, including chemical, comparison and metallurgical microscopes. To perform X-ray diffraction measurements, she visited the National Museum of Natural History.

FitzHugh spent her entire career at the Freer Gallery, working as an analytical and conservation scientist. She was identified by Dr Joyce Hill Stoner as the first woman cultural heritage scientist at the Smithsonian. She soon became an expert in Chinese Jade and bronze, Japanese painting and oriental lacquer. Amongst the many artists' pigments studied by FitzHugh, her work on the chemistry of Han purple and Han blue were groundbreaking.

FitzHugh was interested in the conservation and protection of art. She served as editor of International Institute for Conservation of Historic and Artistic Works (IIC) Abstracts, a journal summarizing the abstracts of books, conference proceedings and dissertations on art, archaeology and architecture. She held various roles in the American Institute for Conservation of Historic and Artistic Works, including Chair of Ethics and Standards and eventually President.

== Awards and honors ==
- 1990: American Institute for Conservation R. J. Gettens Award
- 1992: Honorary member of the American Institute for Conservation
- 2002: International Institute for Conservation of Historic and Artistic Works Forbes Prize
- 2016: Honorary fellow of the International Institute for Conservation

== Legacy ==
FitzHugh retired in 1991, but continued to work at the Smithsonian until 2011. She died in 2017 in Mitchellville, Maryland.

Her personal collection of conservation volumes was donated posthumously to the South African Institute for Heritage Science and Conservation, and form the core of the collection housed there at the Elisabeth FitzHugh Conservation Library

== Family ==
FitzHugh was married to Richard FitzHugh, a biophysicist at the National Institutes of Health.

== Selected publications ==
- RUTHERFORD J. GETTENS; ELISABETH WEST FITZHUGH (May 1966). "I. Azurite and Blue Verditer". Studies in Conservation. 11 (2): 54–61. doi:10.1179/SIC.1966.008. ISSN 0039-3630. Wikidata Q58495434.
- RUTHERFORD J. GETTENS; ELISABETH WEST FITZHUGH (February 1974). "MALACHITE AND GREEN VERDITER". Studies in Conservation. 19 (1): 2–23. doi:10.1179/SIC.1974.001. ISSN 0039-3630. Wikidata Q58496767.
- RUTHERFORD J. GETTENS; ELISABETH WEST FITZHUGH; ROBERT L. FELLER (August 1974). "CALCIUM CARBONATE WHITES". Studies in Conservation. 19 (3): 157–184. doi:10.1179/SIC.1974.014. ISSN 0039-3630. Wikidata Q58496782.
- Elizabeth West Fitzhugh; Robert L. Feller; Ashok Roy (1997). Artists' Pigments: Volume 3: A Handbook of their History and Characteristics (PDF). ISBN 978-0-89468-256-8. LCCN 85028349. OL 2546466M. Wikidata Q67032471.
