= Clelia Giacobini =

Italian microbiologist (1931–2010)

- Born: 6 February 1931; Rome, Italy
- Died: 25 September 2010 (aged 79); Rome, Italy
- Education: Sapienza University, Rome; Institut Pasteur, Paris
- Scientific career
- Fields: Microbiologist, pioneer of microbiology applied to conservation-restoration
- Institutions: Istituto Superiore per la Conservazione ed il Restauro

Clelia Giacobini (6 February 1931 – 25 September 2010) was an Italian microbiologist, and also a pioneer of microbiology applied to conservation-restoration.

== Biography ==
Clelia Giacobini was born in Rome and graduated in Pharmacy and Biology at Sapienza University; subsequently she also obtained a PhD in Herbal medicine and a certificate of Soil microbiology at the Institut Pasteur in Paris (1969).

In the 1950s Cesare Brandi, Director and founder of Central Institute of Restoration - ICR Rome (now Istituto Superiore per la Conservazione ed il Restauro-ISCR"), thought to set up a laboratory of Microbiology in the Institute. Clelia Giacobini participated in its creation (1957).

In 1959 Giacobini remained as the only component of the laboratory staff. At the same time, she was given the teaching of biology in the School of ICR, which she held until retirement (1995), for 36 years. In 1964 the laboratory was established by law and Clelia Giacobini officially took over its direction.

Before the establishment of the microbiology laboratory at the ICR Rome, there was no literature on the biological alterations of art works. For that reason, Clelia Giacobini could be considered a "pioneer" of microbiology applied to conservation science. In 1961 there were the first lab results, listing microbial types that were considered responsible for biological alterations after extensive research on the archaeological and architectural monuments in Rome (Domus Tiberiana, Domus Flavia, Domus Aurea, San Clemente, monumental fountains, etc..).

In 1965, as a result of more investigations, a preliminary methodology was defined: 1) inspection in situ and collection of samples; 2) microscopic examination of samples in the laboratory; 3) cultural isolation of drawings; 4) identification of the organisms. In 1967 she made public the results of further studies involving the definition of the five most typical phenomena of microbial spoilage on the frescoes. In 1970 the laboratory began to develop new and more refined technical and analytical methods, represented mainly by the application of scanning electron microscope, which already allowed the immediate diagnosis of the alteration and the chance to study all microorganisms in their natural environment. Later in the seventies, the workshop arranged to review the phenomenology of alterations in the appearance of biodeterioration, deepening our understanding of nutritional and environmental factors that favor the attack of biological agents.

In the 1980s, the genus and species of these agents were identified, thanks to the collaboration of the British expert Mark Seaward and technical and scientific staff of the laboratory. In this phase of studies there were examined Fossanova Abbey, the excavations of Ostia Antica, the Etruscan tombs of Tarquinia, the Villas of Veneto, the frescoes of Villa Farnese in Caprarola (1988), etc.. The studies enabled the restorers to effectively intervene at Ostia Antica, on the paintings of Assisi Cathedral, on the frescoes of Correggio in Parma, the Scrovegni Chapel in Padua and Leonardo's Last Supper.

Clelia Giacobini was subject of numerous requests for advice and for teaching assignments by several Italian and European authorities, in India, Venezuela and Japan. She chaired the International Conferences on biological deterioration of Cultural Heritage, held in Lucknow (1989) and Yokohama (1992).

Between 1992 and 1995 she was part of the technical-scientific committee for the start of the Italy Risk Map project of cultural heritage.

== Major works ==
- Antonio Tonolo & Clelia Giacobini, Importanza dell'umidità relativa per lo sviluppo di microrganismi nei dipinti su tela, in: Bollettino Istituto Centrale del Restauro, n.36, pp. 191–196, Roma, 1958
- Antonio Tonolo & Clelia Giacobini, Microbiological changes on frescoes, in: Recent advances in conservation; Contributions to the IIC Rome Conference, Butterworths, London, 1963
- Clelia Giacobini & R. Lacerna, Problemi di microbiologia nel settore degli affreschi, in: Bollettino dell’Istituto Centrale del restauro, pagg. 83-108, Roma, 1965
- Clelia Giacobini, Cours de spécialisation dans la conservation et la restauration des monuments et des sites historiques, 1968–1969
- Clelia Giacobini, Elementi di scienze naturali e di microbiologia, Roma, 1970
- Clelia Giacobini & Lidia Barcellona Vero, Metodi microbiologici di studio delle alterazioni delle pietre costituenti strutture murarie all'aperto, in: La conservazione delle sculture all'aperto (Acts of Convegno internazionale di studi), Bologna, 23-26 ottobre 1969, Centro per la conservazione delle sculture all'aperto, Bologna, 1971
- Clelia Giacobini & Maria Bassi, Nuove tecniche di indagine nello studio della microbiologia delle opere d'arte / Istituto di fisica consiglio nazionale delle ricerche. Comunicazioni al XXVI Congresso nazionale dell'A.T.I., 22-25 settembre 1971, XXVI Congresso nazionale dell'A.T.I., 22-25 settembre 1971, Roma, 1971
- Clelia Giacobini & Maria Luisa Veloccia Rinaldi, Forme biologiche delle alghe esistenti sulle sculture all'aperto, Bologna, 1971
- Clelia Giacobini & Others, Manufatti artistici in "pietra" : proposta per uno schema metodologico di studio della degradazione..., 1976–1981
- Clelia Giacobini & Others, Un’indagine relativa alla carica microbica dei dipinti murali, in: Bollettino d’arte (Serie Speciale 1982). Giotto a Padova. Studi sulla conservazione della Cappella degli Scrovegni in Padova, pag. 221 e succ.ve, Istituto Poligrafico e Zecca dello Stato, Roma, 1982
- Clelia Giacobini & Others, Problemi di biodeterioramento, in: Materiali lapidei: problemi relativi allo studio del degrado e della conservazione/ Ministero per i Beni Culturali e Ambientali, Ufficio Centrale per i Beni Ambientali, Architettonici, Archeologici, Artistici e Storici, Istituto Poligrafico e Zecca dello Stato, Roma, 1987
- Clelia Giacobini, & Mark Seaward, Introduzione allo studio dei licheni presenti in alcune fabbriche leccesi, in: Antonio Cassiano & Vincenzo Cazzato, Santa Croce a Lecce: storia e restauri, Congedo, Galatina, 1997

== See also ==
- Conservation science
- List of dates in the history of art conservation
- Heritage Science
