= List of dates in the history of conservation and restoration =

This page details the historic development of Art conservation in Europe and the United States.

== Important dates in the history of art conservation ==
Some key dates in the history of conservation in Europe and the United States include:

- 1565, Restoration of the Sistine Chapel frescoes began [53 years after the ceilings were painted].
- 1726, First attempt was made to restore Leonardo da Vinci's Last Supper by Michelangelo Bellotti.
- 1729, First recorded transfer had been carried out by Domenico Michelini in Venice for a Titian painting (Ulisse Forni, Manuale del pittore restauratore, 1866, p. 106). The profession of restoration becomes more visible in the following years. In the 18th century, painting restoration became a separate profession in France.
- 1735 to 1820, Restoration of paintings in the Spanish royal collections following a 1734 fire. Hundreds of important paintings were methodically treated in a specially constructed studio; materials used have been documented by Zahira Véliz. (Zahira Véliz "The Restoration of Paintings in the Spanish Royal Collections, 1734-1820," Studies in the History of Painting Restoration, ed. Christine Sitwell and Sarah Staniforth, Archetype Publications, 1998, pp. 43–62.)
- 1777, 1785, Pietro Edwards, Director of the Restoration of the Public Pictures of Venice and the Rialto, published on basic concepts of preventive conservation, original vices of painters’ materials, respect for the artist's original intent, and reversibility.
- 1794, Charles Willson Peale recorded in his memo book using wax to impregnate paintings. By the middle of the 19th century, paintings were being wax lined; Rembrandt's Night Watch was wax-lined in 1851. [Note precedent above with glue; first there was impregnation with an adhesive and some years later, lining. Analogous to the 20th-century use of PVA/EVA etc.]
- 1809, Count Chaptal of Napoleon's court filed a report regarding pigments used in Pompeii. [Technical analysis of artists’ materials appears and increases in the 19th century.]
- 1815, Pigment studies by Sir Humphry Davy (he had a small portable chemical laboratory and traveled around Europe, accompanied by Michael Faraday 1813–1815)
- 1850, First U.S. Art Restoration Company was formed in New York City – Oliver Brothers Smithsonian Institution, James Oliver account books
- 1851, Rembrandt's Night Watch is relined with a wax adhesive.
- 1852, The cleaning by John Seguier of nine major pictures in the National Gallery, London led to a fierce public outcry and demand for an inquiry. Cleaning controversies followed in London, Paris, Munich, (in the US by 1978, and about the Sistine Chapel by 1985). (Cleaning controversies had also erupted re. policies at the Louvre in 1793.)
- 1850-1853, Michael Faraday carried out analytical and deterioration studies for the National Gallery, London, investigated varnishes, cleaning methods and the impact of London fog, coal smoke, and gas lighting on the discoloration of surface coatings. His findings were generally ignored.
- 1860s, Oliver Brothers Fine Art Restoration and Conservation has expanded and opened a location in Boston.
- 1863, Max Pettenkofer of Munich patented a method to “reverse the aging of varnish” through exposure to ethanol vapors; this method was later found to increase the interactive zone between paintings and varnish, complicating future cleanings [Ref. Sibylle Schmitt, IIC 1990].
- 1870s, Louis Pasteur carried out analytical studies of paint and optical crystallography for over a decade.
- 1888, Friedrich Rathgen became chemist in charge of the Royal Museums of Berlin (Staatliche Museen), first museum laboratory
- 1896, Wilhelm Röntgen discovered x-rays in 1895 and x-rayed a painting the next year. He called them “X-rays”, using the mathematical designation for something unknown.
- 1920, British Museum Research Laboratory established under the direction of Alexander Scott as a direct response to the poor state of the museum's collections.
- 1920s, George T. Oliver of Oliver Brothers Fine Art Restoration, Boston has invented world's first vacuum table for re-lining paintings. The patent was filed in 1937.
- 1928, Fogg Art Museum’s Technical Department established by the museum's Director, Edward W. Forbes; this was the first research laboratory in an American museum. His allies for technical studies of paintings were Daniel V. Thompson and Alan Burroughs. George L. Stout became Head Conservator and Rutherford John Gettens, the department's chemist.
- 1928, Questionnaire initiated by the German museum council in 1928 on how much to clean, how much to inpaint [Berlin was a leading international art center at this time]. German activities at an international level ended when the National Socialists assumed power in 1933; art experts who emigrated (e.g. Max J. Friedländer, Ernst Gombrich, Julius S. Held, Johannes Hell, Helmut Ruhemann, William Suhr, etc.) influenced attitudes in U.K. and U.S.
- 1930, The first “International Conference for the Study of Scientific Methods for the Examination and Preservation of Works of Art” held in Rome, 13–17, October. Impact on: the founding of IIC, ICOM-CC, many training programs, ethics, standards of practice, documentation, preventive conservation, etc.
- 1930, Museum of Fine Arts, Boston, laboratory established.
- 1930, The first International “Conference for the Study of Scientific Methods for the Examination and Preservation of Works of Art,” Rome. This group decided to edit a “Manual on the Conservation of Paintings” first published in French in 1939, a remarkable international collaborative effort. Re-issued by Archetype, 1997, copyright ICOM.
- 1931, Louvre Museum Laboratory established.
- 1931, James J. Rorimer of the Metropolitan Museum published Ultra-violet Rays and Their Use in the Examination of Works of Art.
- 1931, Athens Charter is adopted
- 1931, Conservation department established at the Walters Art Gallery [now “Museum”] under David Rosen, and chemist Arthur Kopp established a laboratory at the Metropolitan Museum of Art
- 1932-1942, Publication of Technical Studies in the Field of the Fine Arts, published for the Fogg Museum of Art, first technical journal.
- 1932, First edition of the Carta del Restauro (Restoration Charter) prepared, based on the Athens Charter of 1931.
- 1934, Conservation training program began at the Courtauld Institute in London.
- 1934, First translated publication of Max Doerner's The Materials of the Artist and their Use in Paintings. Professor Doerner (1870–1939) was instructor/professor in technical methods at the Royal Bavarian Academy in Munich 1911–1939.
- 1936, Conservation training program began at the Akademie der Bildenden Künste in Vienna.
- 1937, Founding of the State Institute for Technical Tests and Research in the Field of Painting, called the “Doerner Institute.” This Institute also began a training program the next year.
- 1938, Alan Burroughs of the Fogg Art Museum published Art Criticism from a Laboratory, based on his research x-radiographing Old Master paintings.
- 1939, The Istituto Superiore per la Conservazione ed il Restauro (formerly the Istituto Centrale per il Restauro), the Italian body responsible for restoration/conservation rules, is formed in Rome.
- 1940, Manual on the Conservation of Paintings (from the 1930 Rome Conference) published in French in 1939 and in English in 1940. Compiled by 12 international experts: five art historians, five restorers, and two chemists.
- 1943, Conservation training program at the Istituto Centrale in Rome
- 1946, The International Council of Museums was organized at a meeting held in November at the Louvre. A non-governmental organization composed of National Committees in the various member nations with the purpose of furthering international cooperation among museums. The Committee for Conservation (now known as ICOM-CC) began in 1967. Triennial meetings began in 1969.
- 1947, Trial of Han van Meegeren, convicted of forging paintings by Vermeer. The discussions among Paul Coremans, Harold Plenderleith, and F. I. G. Rawlins in connection with this trial were credited by Hero Boothroyd Brooks as important to the establishment of the International Institute for Conservation.
- 1947, Exhibition of cleaned paintings at the National Gallery, London. Controversy and inquiry resulted in the Weaver Report, 1948. (Committee: Paul Coremans, George L. Stout, J. R. H. Weaver, President of Trinity College, Oxford.)
- 1948, Institute Royale du Patrimoine Artistique founded, Brussels; dedicated to the study and conservation of the artistic and cultural heritage of the country. As a federal scientific institution, the institute's primary mission is research and public service.
- 1948, Use of hot table reported, Stephen Rees Jones, Courtauld Institute.
- 1948, The Institut Royal du Patrimoine Artistique|Koninklijk Instituut voor het Kunstpatrimonium (IRPA-KIK) is founded in Brussels, Paul Coremans, Director
- 1948, The “Brussels Preparatory Meeting” is held to plan the founding of the International Institute for Conservation.
- 1949, Conservation training program at the Institut für Technologie der Malerei in Stuttgart.
- 1950, IIC, the International Institute for Conservation, originally known as the “International Institute for the Conservation of Museum Objects,” was incorporated on 27 April 1950. A short history of IIC by Hero Boothroyd Brooks was published on the occasion of its 50th anniversary in 2000. Now 2389 members. [308 Fellows, 1533 individuals, 160 students, 388 institutions July 2007]
- 1950, Establishment of the Faculty of Conservation of Monuments (since 1992 - Faculty of Conservation and Restoration of Works of Art) at the Academy of Fine Arts in Krakow
- 1952, First issue of Studies in Conservation, from the International Institute for Conservation.
- 1952, First regional center in the US opened, the Oberlin Intermuseum Conservation Association, now located in Cleveland.
- 1955, First issue of IIC Abstracts by the International Institute for Conservation. This became Art and Archaeology Technical Abstracts in 1966 when it was published from the NYU, Institute of Fine Arts, Conservation Center, (JHS was Managing Editor from 1969 to 1986). The administration of AATA moved from the NYU Conservation Center to the Getty Conservation Institute in 1985 and the publication went entirely online in 2003
- 1955, Introduction of vacuum pressure for the hot table, R. E. Straub, S. Rees Jones, Studies in Conservation, Vol. II.
- 1957, Establishment of a laboratory of biology applied to the art conservation at the Istituto Centrale in Rome. Microbiologist Clelia Giacobini was Director from 1964 to 1995.
- 1959, The Rome Centre for the Study of the Preservation and Restoration of Cultural Property began operation. Harold Plenderleith, Director. (Known as ICCROM since 1978). Now has 129 member states. Publications, guidelines, an extensive conservation library and international training programs.
- 1960, The heated vacuum re-lining table for painting restoration developed by Jack Willard in the UK.
- 1960, First regular meeting of the IIC-American Group, Isabella Stewart Gardner Museum. Now known as the American Institute for Conservation with more than 3300 members (as of 06).
- 1960, First four students began graduate training in conservation at the Conservation Center, Institute of Fine Arts, New York University (First graduate art conservation training program in the U.S.) Four-year program, moved across the street to 14 East 78th Street, NYC in 1983.
- 1963, Establishment of the Conservation Analytical Laboratory at the Smithsonian Institution. Moved in 1983 to the Museum Support Center in Suitland, Maryland. In 1998, renamed SCMRE, the Smithsonian Center for Materials Research and Education. In 2006, renamed MCI, Museum Conservation Institute.
- 1963, Teoria del Restauro by Cesare Brandi first published.
- 1964, The Venice Charter was approved.
- 1965, The International Council on Monuments and Sites (ICOMOS) is founded
- 1965, National Endowment for the Arts founded. The Museum Program began in 1971 and awarded about $11 million to help start Regional Conservation Centers under John Spencer.
- 1966 November, Florence Flood; brought international awareness to issues of art conservation. The gathering of international conservation professionals together over the next several years stimulated collaboration and the founding of a number of European conservation training programs.
- 1967, The beginning of the ICOM-Committee for Conservation, first triennial meeting held in 1969.
- 1968, Publication of the first code of ethics and standards of practice for conservation internationally (“The Murray Pease Report”) by the IIC-American Group
- 1969, Publication of America's Museums: The Belmont Report, AAM; the need for conservation of collections recognized, government support for conservation considered indispensable. Additional reports have followed from the IIC-AG in 1975, National Institute for Conservation, now known as Heritage Preservation, etc.
- 1969, First painting lined with BEVA 371 (by Gustav Berger). Gerry Hedley later reported the results of a survey in the mid-1980s that BEVA became the most popular lining adhesive internationally.
- 1970, First students began training in the three-year graduate program in conservation, Cooperstown Graduate Program, Cooperstown, NY; takes ten students a year, three-year program, moved to Buffalo State College in 1987.
- 1970s, There were three other full-time, three-year conservation training programs, at the Fogg Art Museum, the Oberlin Intermuseum Conservation Association in Ohio, and the Canadian Conservation Institute in Ottawa; all three ceased providing three-year programs by the end of the decade, but all continue to accept advanced interns.
- 1972, New version of the Carta del Restauro (Restoration Charter) published.
- 1973, IIC-AG changed to the AIC and began the Foundation of the American Institute for Conservation, its non-profit 501(c)(3) sister organization, and the Journal of the American Institute for Conservation.
- 1973, The National Conservation Advisory Council was organized in 1973, funded by the National Museum Act of the Smithsonian Institution. The NCAC surveyed national needs and became the National Institute for the Conservation of Cultural Property in 1982, and changed its name again to Heritage Preservation in 1997. Ca. 150 institutional members as of 2004–06.
- 1973, Andrew Oddy, the main conservator at the British Museum, proposed a test to determine the safety of materials to art objects, now called the Oddy test.
- 1974, First students began training in the three-year graduate program in conservation sponsored jointly by the University of Delaware and Winterthur Museu
- 1974, First students began training in the two-year graduate program in conservation at Queen's University, Kingston, Ontario, Canada
- 1974, Rutherford John Gettens died a week after making a presentation about the need for a conservation history project. FAIC oral history project launched in 1975. Over 239 transcribed interviews now available to researchers housed in the Winterthur Museum archives.
- 1974, 1975, 1976, “Moratoria” on lining declared at conferences at Greenwich, UK; Venice (ICOM-CC 1975), and Ottawa (sponsored by the National Gallery, Canada). Lining practices were reexamined and the regular lining of paintings as a preventive measure by practicing professional conservators decreased steadily. (NOTE: this occurred ca. two decades after the introduction of vacuum lining. A philosophy of “minimal intervention” gained increasing numbers of supporters in all specialties over the next three decades.
- 1976, Research Center on the Materials of the Artist and Conservator at Carnegie Mellon University established, Dr. Robert L. Feller, Director. Now “Art Conservation Research Center”
- 1978, ICOM-CC created the first working paper on the draft definition of the conservator-restorer.
- 1980, The Midwest Regional Conservation Guild is formed and holds its first Annual Meeting at the Indianapolis Museum of Art in the Spring of 1981.
- 1981, The Conservation Education Program at Columbia University accepted students for training in library and archives conservation. This Program moved to the University of Texas in 1992.
- 1982, Major branches of the J. Paul Getty Trust were first defined.
- 1982, Interdisciplinary publications reflecting George L. Stout's concept of the “three-legged stool,” co-authored by conservators, art historians, and scientists appear and increase in number: Art and Autoradiography (Metropolitan Museum, 1982); Examining Velasquez (Gridley McKim-Smith, Greta Andersen-Bergdoll, and Richard Newman, 1988).
- 1982, CAL, the “Conservation Analytical Laboratory” of the Smithsonian Institution, moved to Silver Hill, Maryland. A three-year program for furniture conservation was sponsored there for a limited period of time; a new class was accepted only every three years, and classes were scheduled so that professional furniture conservators could participate in segments but keep their practices. Later the name was changed to SCMRE and in 2005 to “MCI,” Museum Conservation Institute.
- 1984, First meeting of the Association of Graduate Training Programs in Conservation, in conjunction with the annual student conference, Harvard University faculty club; now known as ANAGPIC, Association of North American Graduate Programs in Conservation.
- 1984-1985, New methods of cleaning introduced by Professor Richard Wolbers, University of Delaware, including enzymes, resin soaps, and gels.
- 1985, Getty Conservation Institute began operations in Marina del Rey, CA; in 1997 moved to the Getty Center in Brentwood.
- 1990, First students accepted in the Ph.D. Program in Art Conservation Research; six students graduated by 2003 at the University of Delaware. This program was not granted permanent status. A new Ph.D. program in Preservation Studies at the UD accepted its first students in 2006.
- 1990, NAGPRA, Native American Graves Protection and Repatriation Act.
- 1990 The CAA/Heritage Preservation Award for Distinction in Scholarship and Conservation was initiated for an outstanding contribution by one or more persons who, individual or jointly, have enhanced understanding of art through the application of knowledge and experience in conservation, art history, and art. Winners of this award include Robert L. Feller (92), Molly Ann Fairies (95), W. Thomas Chase, (98), Harry Cooper and Ron Spronk (02), Andrea Kirsh and Rustin S. Levenson (03), Carol Mancusi-Ungaro (04), Paolo Cherchi Usai (film preservation) (05); Don Kalec and Jim Thorpe (architectural conservation) (06).
- 1991, E.C.C.O. (European Confederation of Conservator-Restorers' Organisations) was created. The ECCO code of ethics was adopted in 1993.
- 1995, National Endowment for the Arts ceased funding training in art conservation.
- 1997, RAP, Regional Alliance for Preservation (RAP) began in February 1997 as a pilot project of the Commission on Preservation and Access (Washington, DC) to foster cooperation among the Preservation Field Service programs funded by the NEH. When pilot-project funding ended in February 1998, participants decided to continue RAP as a cooperative program; the alliance expanded to include members of the Association of Regional Conservation Centers (ARCC). There are now 13 members.
- 1999, The International Network for the Conservation of Contemporary Art (INCCA) was established, and by 2008 the network included 150 partner institutions, the majority located in Europe and the United States. Members of INCCA use www.incca.org as their communication platform.
- 2000, New funding for conservation science positions in graduate training programs and major museum conservation laboratories, initiated by Angelica Zander Rudenstine and the Andrew W. Mellon Foundation.
- 2005, The graduate training program in archaeological conservation sponsored jointly by UCLA and the Getty Conservation Institute accepted its first class of students.
- 2006, The new Preservation Studies Doctoral Program at the University of Delaware accepted its first three students.
- 2006, The launch of AMIEN, Art Materials Information and Education Network, jointly sponsored by Mark Gottsegen and The ICA, Cleveland (joining INCCA, the International Network for the Conservation of Contemporary Art, as a resource on the conservation of contemporary art).

== External sources for dates in the history of art conservation ==
- Bewer, Francesca G. A Laboratory for Art: Harvard's Fogg Museum and the Emergence of Conservation in America, 1900-1950 (Cambridge, MA: Harvard Art Museum, 2010).
- Stoner, J.H. (2005). Changing Approaches in Art Conservation: 1925 to the Present. In: Scientific Examination of Art: Modern Techniques in Conservation and Analysis, Arthur M. Sackler Colloquia, March 19–21, 2003, The National Academies Press, Washington, DC.
- Stoner, J.H. (2000). "Are There Great Women Art Conservators". International Institute for Conservation Bulletin, No. 1, February, 3–7.
- Stoner, J.H. (1998). “Documenting Ourselves: the history of 20th-century art conservation”.IIC Bulletin, 1998, No. 2, April, pp. 1–4.
- Stoner, J.H. (1977). "An Oral History Archive," Museum News, 55, no. 6, July/Aug.
