= Heritage Preservation =

American non-profit organization, 1973–2014

Heritage Preservation (active 1973–2014) was an American non-profit organization. Its mission was to preserve the nation's heritage for future generations through innovative leadership, education, and programs. As of June 30, 2015 the organization was dissolved by its board. Several of its programs and resources have been absorbed by the Foundation for Advancement in Conservation. "Records that document the history and activities of Heritage Preservation from its very beginnings as the National Conservation Advisory Council and the National Institute for the Conservation of Cultural Property", including an archive of its website, were accessioned by and are made accessible by the Smithsonian Institution Archives.

== History ==
In 1973, the National Conservation Advisory Council was organized in November, funded by the National Museum Act of the Smithsonian Institution. The NCAC surveyed national needs and became the National Institute for the Conservation of Cultural Property in 1982, and changed its name again to Heritage Preservation in 1997.

One of its first major projects was called Save Outdoor Sculpture! (SOS!). Initiated in 1989, the project is a community-based effort to identify, document, and conserve outdoor sculpture in the United States. By fostering awareness and appreciation, SOS! aims to advocate proper care of a nationwide public resource. The Smithsonian American Art Museum, Research and Scholars Center, became an active partner in the SOS! Project through the Inventories of American Paintings and Sculpture which continues to accept submissions. The project may be viewed as a precursor of community-generated or “crowd-sourced” social media-driven initiatives. Resources in continuing support of SOS!, a discontinued program, may be found on the subpage for the Foundation for Advancement in Conservation.

A second major project was a report produced in 2005 called the Heritage Health Index, which included data from more than 3,000 institutions, among them museums, historical societies, government archives, libraries, scientific organizations and universities. This report was funded by the Institute of Museum and Library Services. The survey found that some 612 million artifacts – from photographs and paintings to nature specimens and pottery – are at risk of deterioration because they are not cared for properly.

== Programs ==
- Rescue Public Murals seeks to bring public attention to U.S. murals, document their unique artistic and historic contributions, and secure the expertise and support to save them.
- Since 1990, 2,600 museums have participated in the Conservation Assessment Program (CAP), including museums in all 50 states and the U. S. territories. Museums have the condition of their collections and historic structures assessed by professional conservators. CAP is administered by Heritage Preservation and funded by the Institute of Museum and Library Services.
- Emergency Programs include the Heritage Emergency Task Force, a partnership of 41 national service organizations and federal agencies created to protect cultural heritage from the damaging effects of natural disasters and other emergencies. The Task Force was founded in 1995 and is co-sponsored by Heritage Preservation and the Federal Emergency Management Agency.
- Heritage Preservation bestows two annual awards. The Ross Merrill Award for Outstanding Commitment to the Preservation and Care of Collections is presented jointly by Heritage Preservation and the American Institute for Conservation of Historic and Artistic Works. It recognizes an organization that has been exemplary in the importance and priority it has given to conservation concerns and in the sustained commitment it has shown to the preservation and care of cultural property. The CAA-Heritage Preservation Joint Award for Distinction in Scholarship and Conservation recognizes an outstanding contribution by one or more persons who have enhanced the understanding of art through the application of knowledge and experience in conservation, art history, and art.
