= Matija Strlič =

Prof Dr Matija Strlič EASA FIIC FRSC
- Born: 1968 (age 57–58); Ljubljana, Slovenia
- Citizenship: Slovenian, British
- Awards: Zois Award (2002), Ambassador of Science of the Republic of Slovenia (2026)
- Scientific career
- Fields: Heritage Science, Chemistry, Conservation
- Workplaces: University of Ljubljana, University College London, Smithsonian Institution

Matija Strlič (maˈtiːja ˈstərlitʃ, born 1968) is a Slovenian heritage scientist and analytical chemist. He is Professor of Analytical Chemistry at the University of Ljubljana and Honorary Professor of Heritage Science at University College London (UCL).

His research focuses on the application of scientific methods to cultural heritage, including studies of degradation of historic paper and other heritage materials, effects of the environment and climate on collections, heritage values and the study of historical odours.

Strlič studied chemistry at the University of Ljubljana and received a PhD in chemistry from the university in 2000.

He joined University College London in 2007 and worked at UCL's Institute for Sustainable Heritage. In 2010, Strlič was course director of UCL's newly established MRes programme in Heritage Science. He was a co-investigator on the Science and Engineering in Arts, Heritage and Archaeology (SEAHA) Centre for Doctoral Training, an EPSRC-funded centre established at University College London in partnership with the University of Oxford and the University of Brighton. He was also a member of the SEAHA Steering Committee. He was Deputy Director of UCL Institute for Sustainable Heritage until 2019.

He also taught on the MSc in Conservation for Archaeology and Museums at UCL Institute of Archaeology (2008-2019).

Strlič served as a Senior Research Fellow at the Smithsonian Institution's Museum Conservation Institute between 2020 and 2022.

At the University of Ljubljana, Strlič is Professor of Analytical Chemistry and leads the Heritage Science Laboratory Ljubljana. He is listed among the teaching staff of the Chair of Analytical Chemistry, where he has taught courses in Analytical chemistry (since 1997) and Natural sciences for conservators (since 2019).

He heads the Centre of Excellence in Green Heritage Science, an interinstitutional Centre established in Slovenia and funded by the European Commission through the Teaming instrument of the Widening programme.

He is member of the European Academy of Sciences and Arts and is Fellow of the Royal Society of Chemistry and the International Institute for Conservation of Historic and Artistic Works. Strlič has been included in the Stanford–Elsevier list of the world's top 2% of scientists, and his Scopus author profile records more than 190 publications.

In 2002, Strlič received the Zois award for outstanding scientific contributions in chemistry, and in 2015, he received the Ambassador of Science of the Republic of Slovenia Award. In 2026, Strlič received the Research Collaboration Index Arts & Humanities Subject Award in recognition of his highly collaborative and cross-disciplinary research.

== Selected publications ==
- Strlič, Matija (2018). "Heritage Science: A Future-Oriented Cross-Disciplinary Field". Angewandte Chemie International Edition. 57 (25): 7260–7261. Bibcode:2018ACIE...57.7260S. doi:10.1002/anie.201804246. PMID 29737009.
- Paolin, Emma; Bembibre, Cecilia; Di Gianvincenzo, Fabiana; Torres-Elguera, Julio Cesar; Deraz, Randa; Kraševec, Ida; Abdellah, Ahmed; Ahmed, Asmaa; Kralj Cigić, Irena; Elnaggar, Abdelrazek; Abdelhalim, Ali; Sawoszczuk, Tomasz; Strlič, Matija (2025). "Ancient Egyptian Mummified Bodies: Cross-disciplinary Analysis of Their Smell". Journal of the American Chemical Society. 147 (8): 6633–6643. Bibcode:2025JAChS.147.6633P. doi:10.1021/jacs.4c15769. PMC 11869298. PMID 39947222.
- Coppola, F.; Frigau, L.; Markelj, J.; Malešič, J.; Conversano, C.; Strlič, M. (2023). "Near-Infrared Spectroscopy and Machine Learning for Accurate Dating of Historical Books". Journal of the American Chemical Society. 145: 12305–12314. doi:10.1021/jacs.3c02835. hdl:11584/361838.
- Strlič, Matija; Thickett, David; Taylor, Joel; Cassar, May (2013). "Damage functions in heritage science". Studies in Conservation. 58 (2): 80–87. doi:10.1179/2047058412Y.0000000073.
- Bembibre, Cecilia; Strlič, Matija (2017). "Smell of heritage: a framework for the identification, analysis and archival of historic odours". Heritage Science. 5 2. doi:10.1186/s40494-016-0114-1.
- Strlič, Matija; Thomas, Jacob; Trafela, Tanja; Cséfalvayová, Linda; Kralj Cigić, Irena; Kolar, Jana; Cassar, May (2009). "Material Degradomics: On the Smell of Old Books". Analytical Chemistry. 81 (20): 8617–8622. Bibcode:2009AnaCh..81.8617S. doi:10.1021/ac9016049. PMID 19761214.
- Cséfalvayová, Linda; Strlič, Matija (2011). "Quantitative NIR Chemical Imaging in Heritage Science". Analytical Chemistry. 83 (13): 5101–5106. Bibcode:2011AnaCh..83.5101C. doi:10.1021/ac200986p. PMID 21604723.
