= Istituto Superiore per la Conservazione ed il Restauro =

Art conservation institute in Rome

The ISCR (Istituto Superiore per la Conservazione ed il Restauro: High Institute for Conservation and Restoration, formerly Istituto Centrale di Restauro: "Central Institute of Restoration" – ICR) is a body of the Ministry of Cultural Heritage and Activities and tourism in Rome. Together with the Opificio delle Pietre Dure in Florence, it is one of the most prestigious institutes in the field of art restoration and art restoration instruction.

Since 1944, there has been a state school for art conservation training inside the Institute in Rome. Since 2006, its diploma is equivalent to a degree course, similar to a master's degree in the US. The courses are limited: to access one must pass an appropriate public contest announced by the Ministry of Heritage and Culture. The training lasts five years and the diploma is subject to the acquisition of 300 credits. In this school, they taught art historians, such as Cesare Brandi, and other scientists of conservation–restoration, such as microbiologist Clelia Giacobini.

== History ==
It was established with the law of 22 July 1939, n° 1240, at the Ministry of National Education in Rome. The activity began on 18 October 1941, when it was inaugurated by the minister Giuseppe Bottai. Cesare Brandi was appointed as the first director, following the recommendation of Giulio Carlo Argan. The institute was created with the aim of promoting the restorer's activity from the field of empirical practice to a multidisciplinary intervention technique based on the joint contribution of art historians and scientific experts. The school, foreseen by law, was activated, with the first course, on 16 November 1942. Within the same institute, the theoretical methodological foundations of the theory of restoration were laid which can be reread in the writings that Cesare Brandi published in the Bulletin of the Central Institute of Restoration and subsequently collected Theory of Restoration in a single publication.

As part of the ICR, the pictorial integration technique defined as "hatching" is developed. The library was established in July 1939, at the same time as the creation of the Royal Central Institute of Restoration. On the initiative of the ICR and the National Research Council, the NorMaL commission was activated in 1977.

The historic headquarters in Piazza San Francesco di Paola was abandoned in 2010. The institution is housed entirely in the monumental complex of San Michele a Ripa Grande. The layout of the historic headquarters, near Piazza San Pietro in Vincoli, in a convent owned by the Minimi friars of San Francesco di Paola, was overseen by the architect Silvio Radiconcini, whose design documents are preserved in the library. The first constituent nucleus of the library, of which the main compositional lines have been maintained, was a legacy from Adolfo Venturi then embellished with a bronze bas-relief by Giacomo Manzù and placed inside the wooden shelves of the same. The scientific equipment, from optical microscopy to radiographic analysis equipment, have been among the most important investments made in this sector by the public administration. On 4 March 2017, the branch of the institute named after Michele D'Elia was inaugurated at the convent of Santa Lucia Nova in Matera.

=== The name ===
The ICR was founded in 1939 with the name "Royal Institute of Restoration". With the advent of the Republic, the term Regio was removed. In 1975, following the foundation of the Ministry for Cultural Heritage in 1974, the ICR changed the "of" to "for", in line with the Ministry's policy aimed at underlining the active presence of the administration. In the latest decrees relating to the reorganization of the Ministry which have followed one another in recent years, the ICR is identified as the "Central Institute of Restoration" although to date there has not been a specific decree of reorganization or just modification of the official name of the Institute. The change of name from Central Institute for Restoration to Higher Institute for Conservation and Restoration sanctioned by Presidential Decree no. 233/2007 concluded the dispute, but with the Prime Ministerial Decree. n. 169/2019 the previous name was reintroduced.

== Structure ==
The tasks of the institution are the following:

- Carry out systematic investigations on the influence that various environmental, natural and accidental factors have on deterioration processes and on the means to prevent and inhibit their effects;
- Carry out the investigations necessary for the formulation of regulations and technical specifications regarding conservation and restoration interventions;
- Provide scientific and technical advice to the peripheral bodies of the Ministry, as well as to the Regions;
- Provide for the teaching of restoration in particular for the technical-scientific personnel of the administration and refresher courses for the same personnel of the State administration and regional administrations who request it; and
- Carry out restorations for particularly complex interventions or that respond to particular research needs or educational purposes.

=== School of higher education and study ===
Since 1944, the central institute has had a school for the training of restorers which, in 1998, with the promulgation of Legislative Decree 368/98, took the name of "School of advanced training and study" for teaching of the restoration. Since 2006 (Legislative Decree 156/2006, art. 29, paragraph 9), the diploma awarded is equivalent to a master's degree diploma.

== Logo ==
The logo represents the allegory of Conservatione, an eighteenth-century engraving by Pier Leone Casella. She is described thus by the author: "A woman dressed in gold, with an olive wreath on her head, in her right hand she will hold a bundle of millet, and in her left a gold circle. The gold and the olive mean conservation, this because it preserves the bodies from corruption, and that because it is difficult to corrupt. Millet likewise preserves the city. The circle, like that which in figures has no beginning or end, can signify the duration of things, which are preserved by means of a circular transmutation."

== Directors ==
- Cesare Brandi (1939–1961)
- Pasquale Rotondi (1961–1973)
- Giovanni Urbani (1973–1983)
- Umberto Baldini (1983–1987)
- Michele d'Elia (1987–1991)
- Evelina Borea (1991–1994)
- Michele Cordaro (1995–2000)
- Almamaria Tantillo Mignosi (2000–2002)
- Caterina Bon Valsassina (2002–2009)
- Gisella Capponi (2009–2018)
- Luigi Ficacci (2018–2021)
- Alessandra Marino (2021–present)

== See also ==
- Conservation science
- List of dates in the history of art conservation
- Heritage Science
