= Save Outdoor Sculpture! =

Art conservation program (1989–1999)

The SOS! logo

Save Outdoor Sculpture! (SOS!) was a community-based effort to identify, document, and conserve outdoor sculpture in the United States. The program was initiated in 1989 and ended in 1999.

== History ==
Save Outdoor Sculpture! was initiated by Heritage Preservation: The National Institute of Conservation in 1989. As of 1998, volunteers had cataloged and assessed the condition of over 30,000 outdoor statues and monuments.

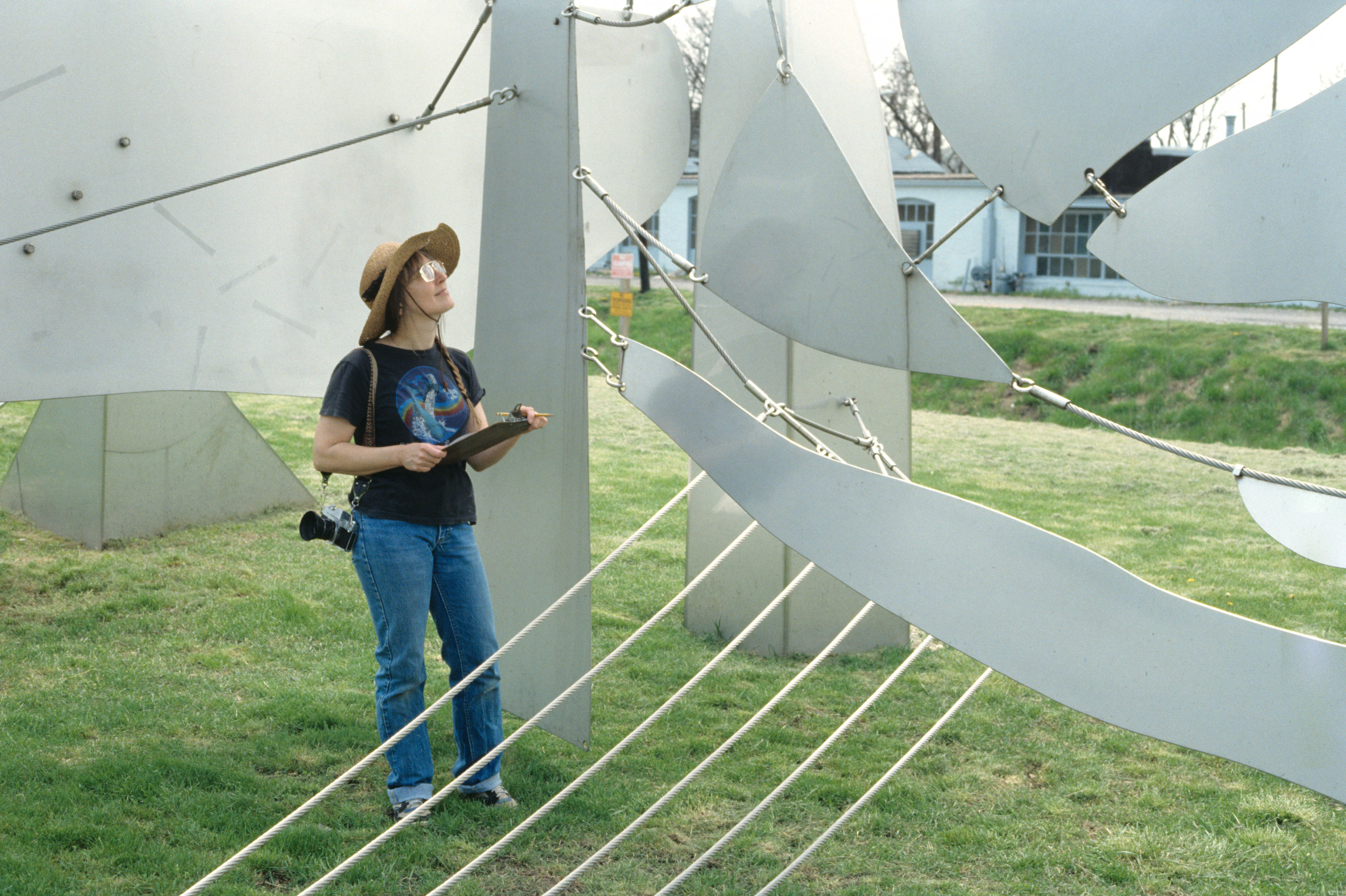
Save Outdoor Sculpture Inventory, 1994 in Indianapolis, Indiana

The Smithsonian Museum of American Art became an active partner in the SOS! project, making SOS! material available online as part of the Inventory of American Sculpture at the Smithsonian American Art Museum. "Some of the most-requested materials" are available via the Foundation for Advancement in Conservation. Other records and resources for SOS!, including the Heritage Preservation website, including the public art guidance "Designing Outdoor Sculpture Today for Tomorrow", and "Mural Creation Best Practices", were accessioned by and are made accessible by the Smithsonian Institution Archives.

In the 1990s, the organization funded a Cleveland Sculpture Center effort to inventory and preserve 36 sculptures in Ohio.

== Educational programs ==
A primary objective of SOS! was to educate and create a number of programs for children. For example, SOS! partnered with the Girl Scouts of the USA to create a Girl Scout patch for scouts who participated in the project.
