= Institute of Conservation =

British charitable organization

- Institute of Conservation
- Formation: 2005
- Headquarters: London

The Institute of Conservation (Icon) is a charity championing heritage conservation, and is the professional membership body for the conservation profession.

With approximately 2,300 members worldwide, Icon supports conservators and the wider heritage sector to safeguard cultural heritage from damage and decay and its network of skilled practitioners cares for objects large and small. From the industrial to the ancient, the work of conservators intersects global histories of art, craft, engineering and production.

Setting the Professional Standards of practice for the profession, Icon ensures objects and collections are protected and preserved for future generations by conservators with strong technical skills and expertise in conservation practice, theory and ethics.

== Background ==
The institute is the UK professional body for those who care for cultural heritage. This includes objects and collections held by public and private museums, art galleries, libraries, archives, record offices and historic houses; as well as privately owned possessions in people's homes, from furniture to family photographs. Cultural heritage includes buildings as well as movable items in collections. Icon's members - conservators and restorers - care for things attached to buildings too, like wall paintings or sculpture, but the care of built structures themselves is mostly the domain of conservation architects represented by the Institute of Historic Building Conservation.

== History ==
Icon was formed in 2005 as a result of a merger between five bodies:

- The United Kingdom Institute for Conservation, UKIC, founded 1977, formerly the UK Group of the International Institute for Conservation of Historic and Artistic Works (IIC)
- The Institute of Paper Conservation (IPC, founded 1977, as an off-shoot of the UK Group of IIC)
- The Scottish Society for Conservation and Restoration (SSCR)
- The Photographic Materials Conservation Group
- The Care of Collections Forum

In the years leading up to convergence, these five organisations were known collectively as the 'Vanguard Bodies' of the National Council for Conservation-Restoration (NCCR). In 2006 a sixth organisation, the Institute of Conservation Science also merged into Icon.

A number of other bodies opted not to merge into Icon in 2005. There remain three 'hybrid' bodies to which conservators belong but which are not exclusively concerned with conservation: Natural Sciences Collections Association, The British Horological Institute and The Archives and Records Association.

From 2005, Icon owned the Chantry Library - a collection of publications concerning paper and book conservation, established in 1999. In 2016, ownership passed to the Oxford Conservation Consortium.

A series of Conservation Awards, recognising achievements in UK conservation, was instituted by the Conservation Unit of the Museums & Galleries Commission in 1994, supported by Jerwood Arts but taken over by UKIC in 2002 and by Icon from 2005, supported for some years by The Pilgrim Trust. The Icon Conservation Awards of 2005 were backed by Sir Paul McCartney. They were followed by Icon Conservation Awards in 2007, 2010 and 2015.

== Activities ==
The Institute brings together all those involved with the care of cultural heritage, whether directly involved, including professional conservators and restorers, conservation scientists and teachers, students and interns, or organisations and individuals that own or hold items of heritage. Its membership also includes volunteers, heritage professionals and many others who share a commitment to improving understanding of and access to the cultural heritage. Most of its members are UK-based but many also work internationally.

The Institute's vision is for cultural heritage to be valued and accessible, and its future to be enhanced and safeguarded. It raises public and political awareness of the cultural, social and economic value of caring for heritage and champions high standards of conservation.

== Membership ==
Categories of membership are Accredited (ACR), Emeritus (ACR (Emeritus)), Pathway (for those working towards Accreditation), Associate, Student, and Supporter.

== Professional Accreditation ==
Since 2000, the Institute of Conservation and its predecessor bodies have operated professional accreditation for trained and qualified professionals, who are now designated “Icon Accredited” and use the post-nominal ACR (Accredited Conservator-Restorer). They are searchable online via the Find a Conservator Service and among those listed are practices offering a commercial service. The formal accreditation scheme fulfils the role of self-regulation of the profession in the UK, underpinned by Professional Standards, a Code of Conduct and Complaints Procedure, all based on principles of agreed ethical practice. Over 1000 Icon members are currently accredited.

== Leadership and Governance ==
The institute is a registered charity with a board of sixteen trustees. Chaired by Emma Chaplin, previous chairs include James Grierson, Siobhan Stevenson, Juergen Vervoorst, Diane Gwilt, Simon Cane, Anna Southall OBE and Interim Chair Carole Milner OBE. The chief executive officer is Emma Jhita. Previous CEOs include Sara Robertson, Alison Richmond, and Alastair McCapra.

An Accreditation Committee oversees the formal process of accreditation. Its current chair is Sarah Peek, former chairs having been Sarah Staniforth CBE and Clare Meredith. The Professional Standards and Development oversees, manages and advises on policy development and implementation of conservation related professional standards, training and education and research, and is currently chaired by Mel Houston.

== Conferences ==
In addition to the conferences and other events organised by its speciality groups and networks, Icon organises a Biennial Conference.

== Publications and Communications ==
- The Journal of the Institute of Conservation, published three times a year, ISSN 1945-5224, Editor Jonathan Kemp
- Iconnect Magazine, published quarterly, ISSN 1749-8988, Editor Karen Young.
- The Institute's electronic newsletters are Icon Newsletter, distributed monthly externally, and Iconnect, distributed internally to members

Recent conference publications have included:

- Textile Group symposium and seminar post-prints
- Recent Advances in Glass and Ceramics Conservation 2019
- Unexpected fame: Conservation approaches to the preparatory object 2018
- Archaeological Archive Storage: Problems, Potentials and Solutions 2016
- Adapt & Evolve: East Asian Materials and Techniques in Western Conservation 2015
- Conservation of Feather and Gut Materials 2009
- Furniture and Wooden Objects Group Symposium 2019

== Special Interest Groups ==
Icon supports 28 Special Interest Groups which are the engine of professional engagement, offering programmes of conferences, workshops and other networking events. The special interest groups are Archaeology, Books and Paper, Care of Collections, Ceramics and Glass, Ethnography, Furniture and Wooden Objects, Gilding and Decorative Surfaces, Heritage Science, Historic Interiors, Metals, Paintings, Photographic Materials, Stained Glass, Stone and Wall Paintings and Textiles. Its Networks are Higher Education Institutions, Contemporary Art, Documentation, Dynamic Objects (including clocks), Emerging Professionals, Environmental Sustainability, Modern Materials and Pest Management. There are also Groups for Scotland, Wales, and Northern Ireland.

== Cooperation ==
Icon is a founding member of the National Heritage Science Forum and a member of the Heritage Alliance. It works with Historic England, and has links with Museums, Archives and Libraries Division of the Welsh Government and Historic Environment Scotland (HES).

In 1991 (as UKIC and IPC), it was a founding member of the European Confederation of Conservator-Restorers' Organisations, from which it withdrew in 2007.

Icon contributes to the development of conservation standards under the auspices of the British Standards Institution. Icon works in liaison with the International Institute for Conservation, also based in London, and its members contribute to the work of the Conservation Committee of the International Council of Museums. It works closely with the Society for the Protection of Ancient Buildings.
