= Heritage science =

Cross-disciplinary scientific research of cultural heritage

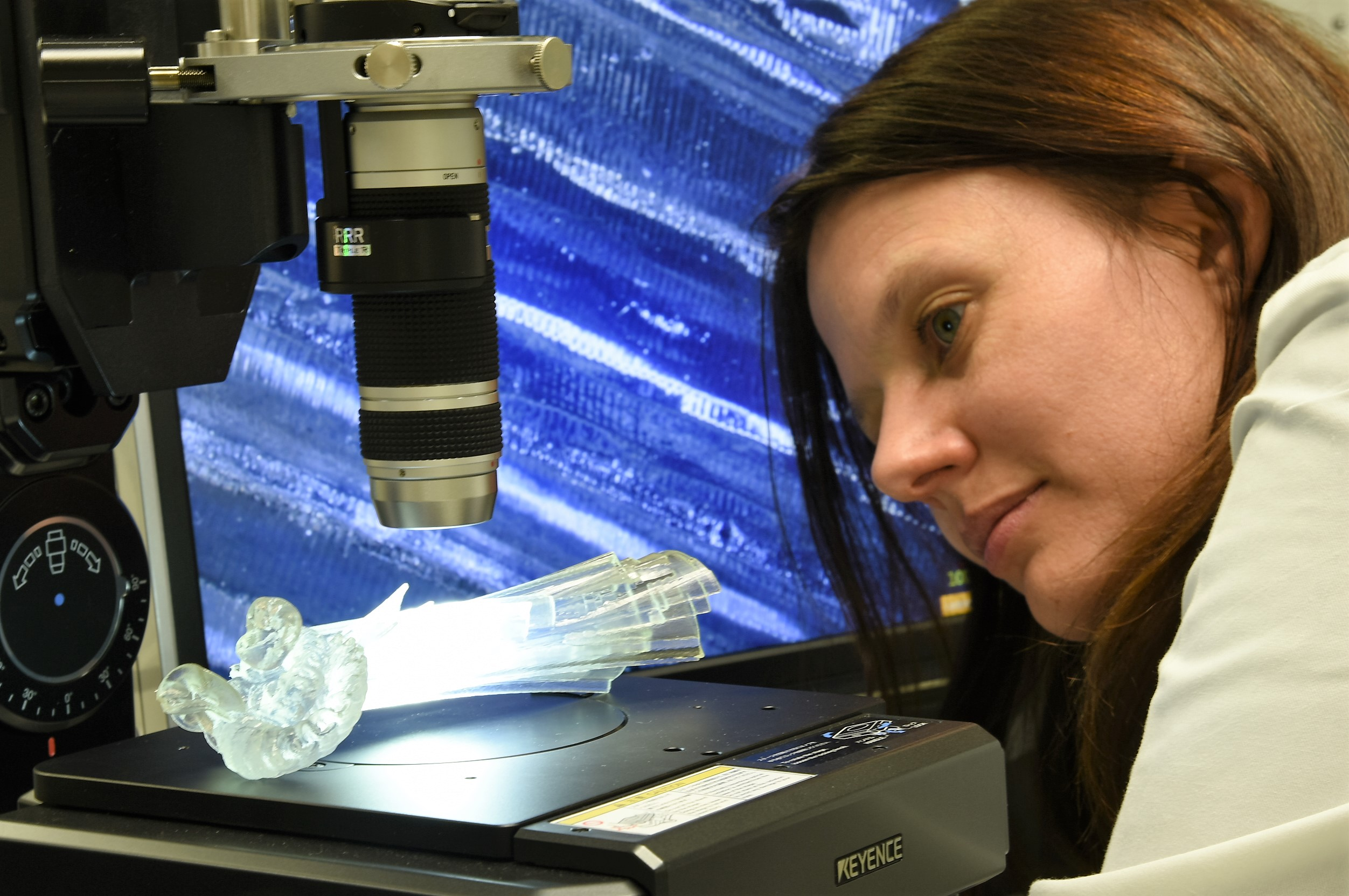
Examination of a 3D printed artwork by Tom Lomax using microscopy

Heritage science is the interdisciplinary domain of scientific study of cultural and natural heritage. Heritage science draws on diverse humanities, sciences and engineering disciplines. It focuses on enhancing the understanding, care and sustainable use of heritage so it can enrich people's lives, both today and in the future. Heritage science is an umbrella term encompassing all forms of scientific enquiry into human works and the combined works of nature and humans, of value to people.

The above definition was developed through a community consultation organised by ICCROM and the European Research Infrastructure for Heritage Science in 2019.

The term has become widely used after 2006, when it became increasingly evident that the more traditional terms conservation science or preservation science inadequately reflected the breadth of research into cultural heritage. Heritage scientists in museums, galleries, libraries, archives, universities and research institutions support conservation (often called conservation science), access (e.g. development of new ICT tools), interpretation, including archaeometry and archaeological science (e.g. dating, provenancing, attribution), heritage management (e.g. development of tools and knowledge supporting strategic or environmental management decisions) and wider societal engagement with heritage (e.g. heritage values and ethics). Heritage science is also an excellent vehicle for public engagement with science as well as heritage.

Heritage science is seen as "key to the long-term sustainability of heritage: it is about managing change and risk and maximising social, cultural and economic benefit not just today, but in such a way that we can pass on to future generations that which we have inherited." Domains of research, where heritage science makes a particular input were recognised by the United Kingdom National Heritage Science Strategy documents to be museums, galleries, libraries and archives; the built historic environment and archaeology.

== Theory ==
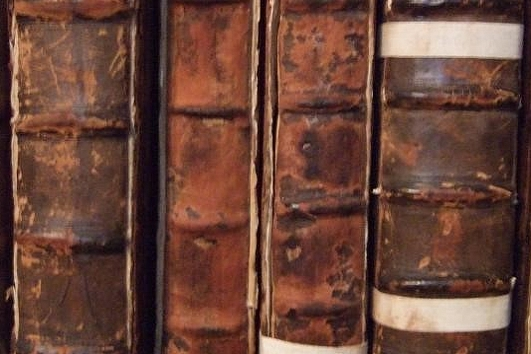
Red rot on leather bindings was one of the first conservation issues to excite scientists.

The field still requires its literature canon, and opinions on whether heritage science is a domain in its own right or a field of research diverge. However, this appears to be a matter of academic recognition, rather than a matter of research practice.

Heritage science is an old field of research: in his Royal Institution Christmas Lecture in 1843, Michael Faraday already pointed out how pollution importantly contributes to book degradation. The following premises appear to be of defining importance:

1. Heritage science is inherently biased, as scientists, by doing research on heritage, contribute to its value: they create and popularize heritage through their research.
2. Heritage science is neither fundamental nor experimental: work with actual heritage objects, buildings or sites cannot be repeatable, because heritage is not an experiment. On the other hand, the scientific method and deductive reasoning are easily applied when working with models and model objects, which heritage scientists often do due to the high value of actual historic objects and consequentially, sampling restrictions.

Since the historical context of heritage is often unknown, there can be any number of variables affecting the heritage system under observation – inductive reasoning is therefore often applied in heritage science. In this aspect, the premise of heritage science comes close to social science. Heritage that is accessible, in its preserved authentic form or as a (digital) reproduction, is also a "resource for economic growth, employment and social cohesion". Through improved access, heritage science can contribute to people's well-being. Heritage science is proof that there is no world of 'Two Cultures'. A scientist, researching heritage defies the existence of the divide: there can be no scientific research of heritage without a contribution by humanities research. Heritage science also successfully bridges science and notions of culture, because it provides an attractive vehicle to convey ideas and concepts related to technology and engineering, as well as culture and society. Heritage science can be considered an anthropogenic analogue to environmental geography, which was defined by Halford Mackinder in 1887 as a discipline that aims to "bridge one of the greatest of all gaps" between "the natural sciences and the study of humanity". A different definition of heritage as part of a group's social psychology has been proposed by F.F.J. Schouten as "history processed through mythology, ideology, nationalism, local pride, romantic ideas or just plain marketing."

== Research ==
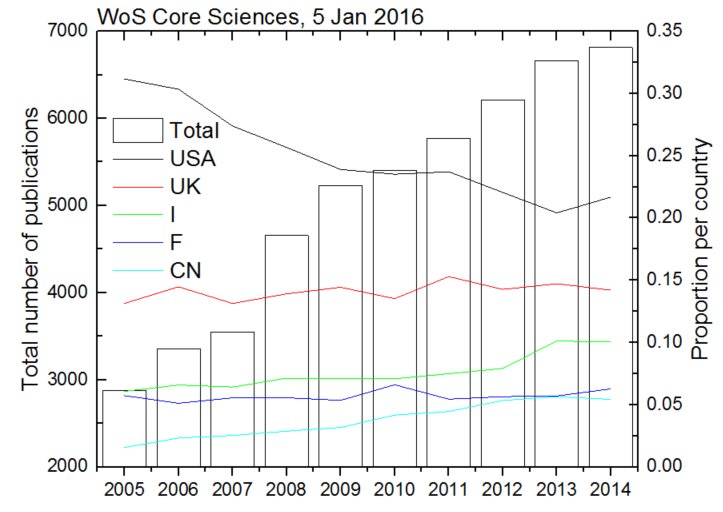
Publication trends in the heritage science field, 2005–2014

Heritage science is an increasingly lively science domain. Materials and techniques of the past are often very difficult to study and state-of-the-art techniques and methods need to be employed. Discoveries new to science are often the result of such endeavours, e.g. new antibiotics from bacteria discovered in the Cave of Altamira, in Spain. With its wide definition, heritage science spans a significant variety of scientific activities. In order to support conservation, access, interpretation and management, heritage science must be based on an interdisciplinary palette of knowledge, from fundamental sciences (chemistry, physics, mathematics, biology) to arts and humanities (conservation, archaeology, philosophy, ethics, history, art history etc.), including economics, sociology, computer sciences and engineering.

In academia, heritage science is often performed by scientists spending a proportion of their time on heritage-related research. The academic field, judged by the number of academic outputs published annually, is steadily increasing. This could be taken to estimate the domain size – with the number of outputs in 2014 being 6,800 (Source: Web of Science), it could be assumed that there are about 3,000 heritage scientists active in the field (publishing on average 2 academic publications per year). This goes against the generally held view that the field is small.

The proportion per country varies greatly, about 20% of researchers being active in the US, 15% in the UK, 10% in Italy, 5% in France, and 5% in China (with a strong increase in the last decade).

While the results of the field are published in a large number of journals from the application and methodology field that accept interdisciplinary publications, since 2013, a specific journal was developed for the field, Heritage Science. In 2013, the Mind the Gap project, funded by the UK EPSRC/AHRC Science and Heritage Programme, reported on the drivers and impediments in cross-disciplinary research. The project found that there is no gap between rigour and relevance in heritage science research, but rather that there is a continuum of activity. However, there was less satisfaction with heritage science research in relation to its impact on practice, in comparison to its academic impact.

In 2017, in the frame of H2020-INFRADEV-2016-2, the European programme for the development and long-term sustainability of new pan-European research infrastructures, the European Commission funded the Preparatory Phase of the project European Research Infrastructure for Heritage Science (E-RIHS) that supports research on heritage interpretation, preservation, documentation and management. Its mission is to deliver integrated access to expertise, data and technologies through a standardized approach, and to integrate world-leading European facilities into an organisation with a clear identity and a strong cohesive role within the global heritage science community. After a further implementation phase from 2022 to 2004, on March 28, 2025 E-RIHS has been recognized as a European Research Infrastructure Consortium (ERIC), changing its status from a project to an entity with legal personality.

At the University of Opole in Poland, the UNESCO Chair on Cultural Property Law publishes critical research relating to the intersection between law, culture, cultural diversity, and cultural heritage.

== Higher education ==
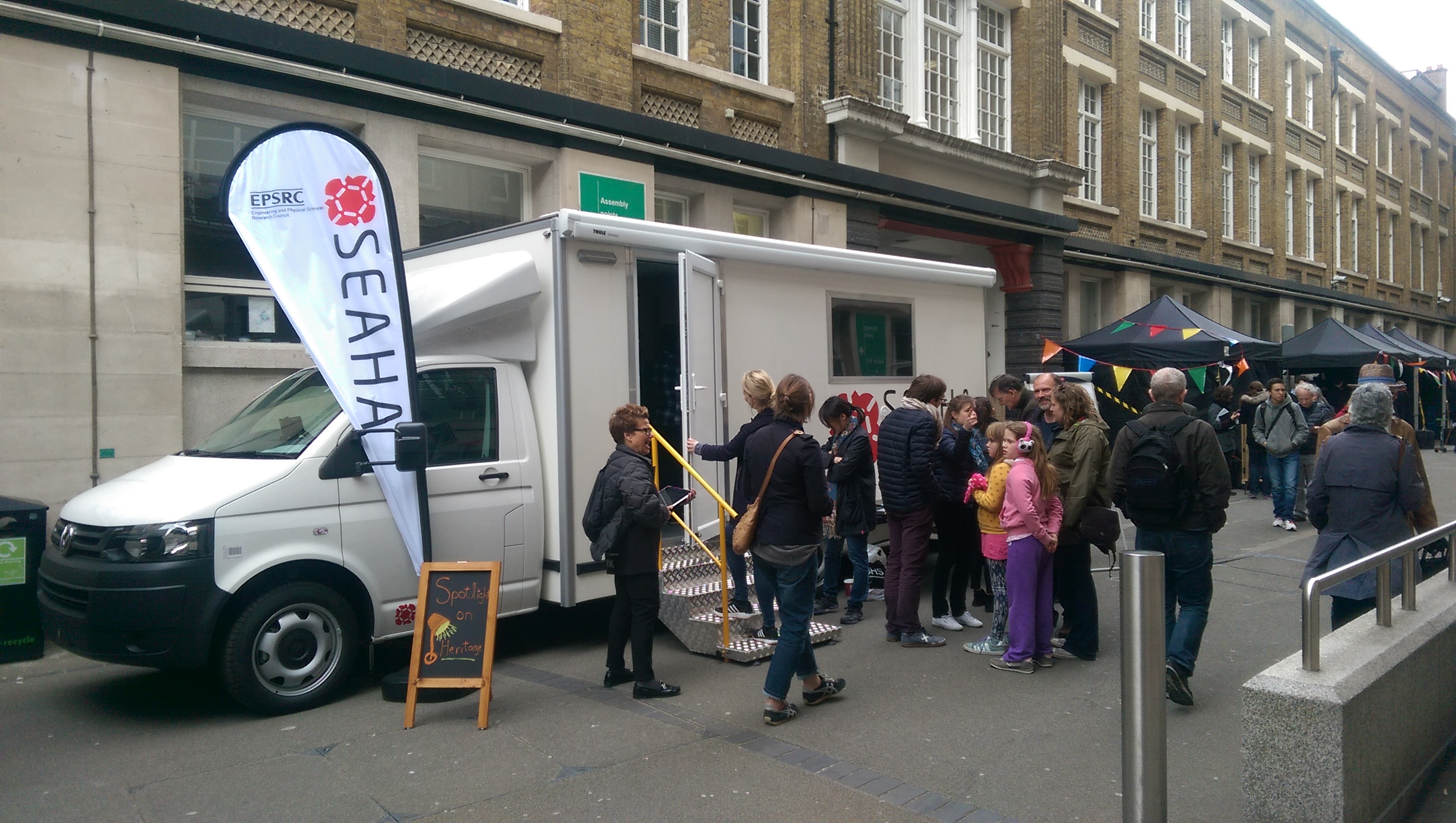
The SEAHA Mobile Heritage Laboratory for field research and public engagement with science and heritage

The heritage science career paths are various. Due to the cross-disciplinary nature of heritage science, any academic background is suitable, from formal sciences, natural sciences to social sciences. Most researchers have entered the field by carrying out doctoral research in the field, because there is currently no undergraduate course in this domain. Since 2010, Master's degree courses in heritage science have become available at University College London and Queen's University Belfast. In Italy, since early 2000s, students can obtain undergraduate and/or graduate degrees in conservation science at the University of Florence, University of Bologna, and a recently created programme at the University of Venice. Several other universities in Italy have faculty members whose primary research focus is in heritage science; these groups often accept international students who would like to obtain a PhD in the field. Taught courses in heritage science programmes include elements of heritage science, e.g. technical art history is often part of art history courses, and natural sciences are often taught in conservation courses. Brandenburg University of Technology in Germany offers the international Master's programme World Heritage Studies and PhD programme Heritage Studies.

At University College London, University of Oxford and University of Brighton, the Centre for Doctoral Training in Science and Engineering in Arts, Heritage and Archaeology (SEAHA) was established in 2014. A key aspect of the SEAHA scheme is the collaborative nature of projects, enabling partnerships between academic institutions, industry and national heritage agencies and giving an applied focus to the research training. Major regional initiatives include the Domaine d'intérêt majeur in the Île-de-France region of France (Ancient and Heritage Materials, 2017–2021; Tangible Heritage, 2022–2026), which has funded dozens of research projects since its creation.

Since the field requires significant cross-disciplinary and transferable skills, graduates may be able to take jobs in industry and academia. To work within the field of heritage science (e.g. in a museum laboratory), a PhD in a field of science and significant experience in a heritage environment is typically required.

== Professional activities ==
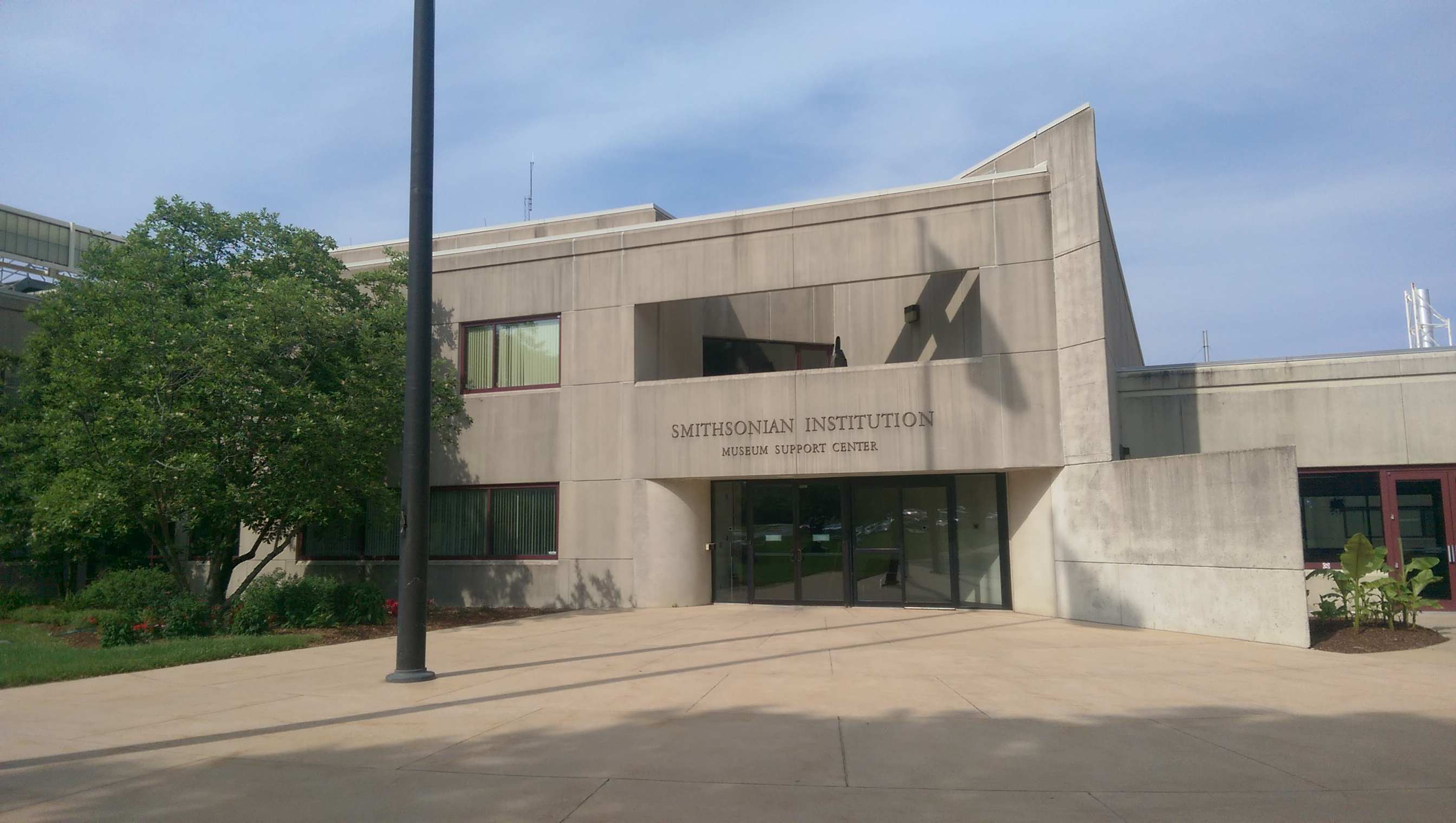
The Museum Conservation Institute of the Smithsonian Institution is part of its Museum Support Center in Suitland, Maryland.

Many major heritage institutions have heritage science departments.

A UK body, the National Heritage Science Forum was established to enable the 'users' and 'doers' of heritage science to access information on heritage science research, to exchange knowledge and increase collaboration. In 2016, the forum had 20 institutional members.

Several international professional associations have heritage science groups:

- Committee for Conservation, Working Group Scientific Research (International Council of Museums)
- Institute for Conservation, Heritage Science Group (Institute for Conservation)
- Royal Society of Chemistry, Heritage Science Expert Working Group (EWG), which produces freely available Technical Briefs on a wide range of topics for conservators, scientists, and students

The Heritage Science Research Network captures the current activity in the field in the UK. In Spain, the Spanish Network of Science and Technology for the Conservation of Cultural Heritage (TechnoHeritage) brings together more than 65 research groups working in heritage science, from the Spanish National Research Council (CSIC), universities, conservation institutes and other cultural institutions.

== Events ==
There are major heritage science events including conferences, symposia, and meetings.

In addition, conferences organised by the Institute of Conservation, American Institute for Conservation and International Institute for Conservation usually feature heritage science sessions and talks.

== Journals ==
Notable journals often or exclusively publishing academic papers in heritage science include:

- Heritage Science, open-access & peer-reviewed journal published by SpringerOpen, part of Springer Nature
- Archaeometry
- Heritage
- Journal of Cultural Heritage
- Journal of the American Institute for Conservation
- Studies in Conservation

== See also ==
- Heritage studies
- Paleo-inspiration
