= European Confederation of Conservator-Restorers' Organisations =

European conservation-restoration organization

European Confederation of Conservator-Restorers' Organisations (ECCO)
- Founded: 1991
- Type: Non-Governmental Organisation
- Purpose: Conservation-restoration of cultural heritage
- Headquarters: 70 Rue Coudenberg, BE-1000 Brussels, Belgium
- Region served: Europe
- Members: 6,000 (individuals); 25 (organisations)
- Key people: Elis Marçal (President)
- Website: www.ecco-eu.org

The European Confederation of Conservator-Restorers' Organisations (E.C.C.O.) is a European non-governmental professional organisation aimed at safeguarding cultural heritage through the use of conservation-restoration techniques.

== Organisation and objectives ==
E.C.C.O. was established in 1991 by 14 European conservator-restorers' organisations. As of 2018 it represents close to 6,000 professionals within 22 European countries and 25 members organisations, including one international body (International Association of Book and Papers Conservators – IADA). E.C.C.O. represents the field of preservation of cultural heritage, both movable and immovable, with the mission:

- to organize, develop and promote, on a practical, scientific and cultural level, the profession of the Conservator-Restorer
- to set standards and regulate practice at European level and enhance communication between and mobility of professionals
- to strengthen the role and responsibilities of the Conservator-Restorer in relation to others in safeguarding cultural heritage.

== History ==
E.C.C.O. was founded on 14 October 1991 as European federation of restorers’ associations, with the aim of working together to develop a common European project for professional recognition of the conservator-restorers’ profession. New associations have joined as the European Union has expanded. E.C.C.O. has established principles and encouraged regulation to control access to the profession of the Conservator-Restorer, by working on professional standards and publishing guidelines for education and practice.

Projects in which E.C.C.O. has participated include APEL (1998–2001), CON.B.E.FOR (1999–2001), and FULCO (1998), resulting in the Document of Vienna. E.C.C.O. was also involved in the drawing of the Document of Pavia (1997), the Namur Declaration (2015), and the Declaration of Berlin (2016). E.C.C.O. has produced various professional guidelines:

- I The Profession (2002)
- II Code of Ethics (2003)
- III Education and Training (2004)
- Competences for Access to the Conservation-Restoration Profession (2011)

Since the end of 2014, E.C.C.O. has followed a new strategic plan and its proposed implementation. Since April 2015, E.C.C.O. has been granted observer status to the plenary sessions of the Council of Europe Steering Committee on Landscape, Heritage and Culture (CDCPP). Several projects are running concerning the legal situation of Cultural Heritage and Conservator-Restorers throughout Europe, working towards mutual recognition of the members of E.C.C.O.’s member organizations in Europe. The international network in the field of cultural heritage and conservation-restoration is being extended and intensified working with ICCROM, ENCoRE, ICOMOS, Europa Nostra, IIC, ICOM-CC, and other organisations. As a member, E.C.C.O. is also involved in the activities of the network in the European Heritage Alliance 3.3. Since 2017, E.C.C.O. has participated in the European Commission project Voices of Culture – Skills, Training and Knowledge Transfer: Traditional and Emerging Heritage – Structured Dialogue. In November 2016, the E.C.C.O. 20th Anniversary Barcelona book was published.

== Presidents of E.C.C.O. ==
The following have been presidents of E.C.C.O.:

- Mogens Koch (1991–1992)
- Ulrich Schiessl (1993–1994)
- Pierre Masson (1995–1997)
- Stéfan Pennec (1998–2000)
- Gerlinde Tauschnig (2001–2002)
- Ylva Player Dahnsjö (2003–2004)
- Michael van Gompen (2005)
- Monica Martelli Castaldi (2006–2012)
- Susan Corr (2013 – present)

== See also ==
- List of cultural conservation-restoration organizations
- List of dates in the history of conservation and restoration
