= Sant'Agnese a Vignano =

Roman Catholic church in Tuscany, Italy

Coordinates: 43.3294°N 11.3597°E

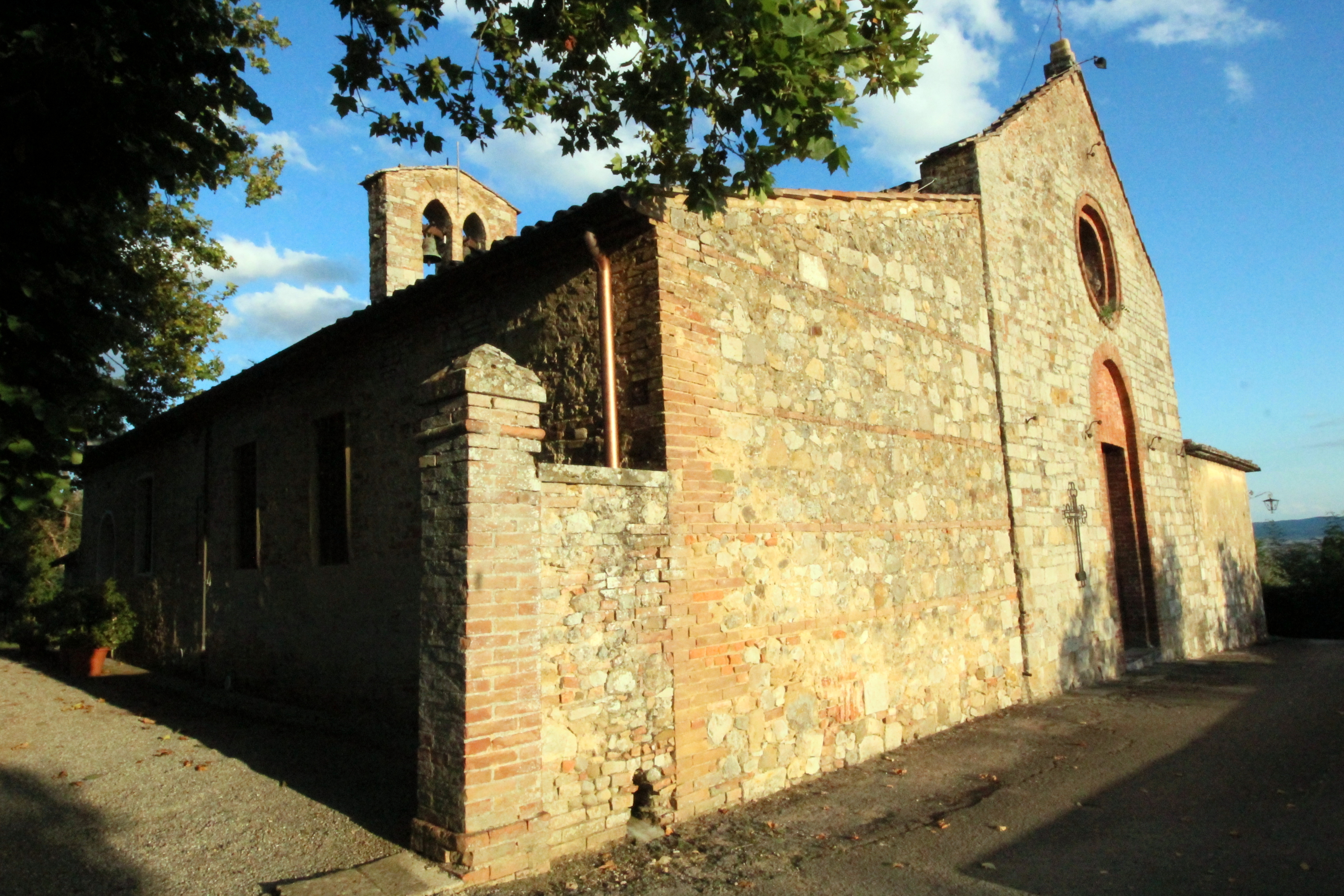
Sant'Agnese a Vignano

Sant'Agnese a Vignano is a Renaissance-style, Roman Catholic church located in the village of Vignano just outside the walls of the city of Siena, region of Tuscany, Italy. It is part of the archdiocese of Siena-Colle of Val d'Elsa-Montalcino.

== History ==
A church at the site is mentioned in 1175, but underwent reconstruction in later centuries. Again restored in 1910 and 1930. The church contains an altarpiece depicting a Madonna and Child by Bartolo di Fredi; a 20th-century statue of Santa Agnese by Fulvio Corsini; and a work by the sculptor Tommaso Redi. The inventory from 1840 also noted altarpieces by Astolfo Petrazzi (San Domenico) and Giuseppe Nicola Nasini (Madonna del Rosario).
