= Oliver Brothers Fine Art Restoration =

Art restoration establishment in the United States

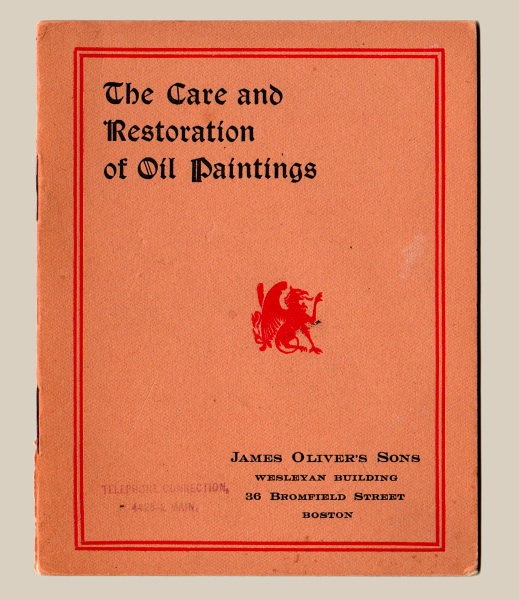
An early twentieth century Oliver Brothers brochure.

Oliver Brothers Fine Art Restoration and Conservation is believed to be the first art restoration establishment in the United States. For more than one and one-half centuries, the Olivers and their successors have restored and conserved antique and contemporary paintings, original works on paper, fine art prints, icons, murals, original photographs, documents, sculpture, gilded objects, and picture frames for private collectors, museums, art dealers, auction houses, galleries, corporations, universities, historical societies, libraries, and others.

== History ==
=== Origins ===
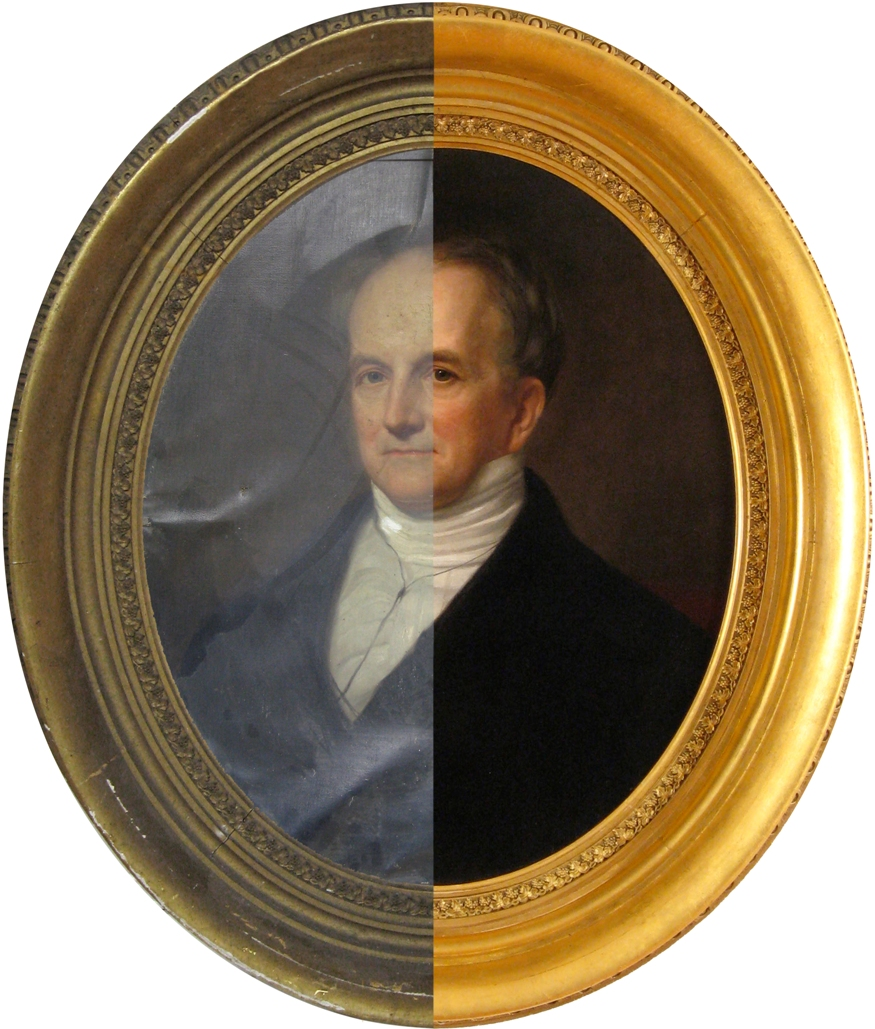
Art Restoration, Painting and Frame Restoration, before and after, by Oliver Brothers Art Restoration Boston

James Oliver, who was trained as an art restorer in his native Scotland, and his son George founded what is believed to be the first art restoration business in the United States in New York City in 1850. Throughout the nineteenth century, clients included The Metropolitan Museum of Art, art dealers Samuel Putnam Avery and M. Knoedler & Co., and restaurateur Lorenzo Delmonico. In the late 1860s, George Oliver moved to Boston, Mass., where he opened a second art restoration shop. Eventually, the New York location was closed.

=== Early 20th Century- Innovation ===
In time, George’s two sons, brothers George T. ("Taylor") and Frederick Oliver (grandsons of original founder James), joined and eventually took over the family business, which, for the first time, would operate under the name "Oliver Brothers". Taylor perfected several procedures for removing surface blemishes and transferring paintings on canvasses with defective supports. In the 1920s, he designed and constructed a prototype vacuum hot table to use in his process for relining paintings, for which he received a patent in 1937 – U.S. Patent# 2,073,802. The vacuum hot table has since been adopted throughout the art restoration and conservation industry for use in restoring paintings on textile supports. Taylor's original prototype table remained in use at Oliver Brothers until the early 2000s.

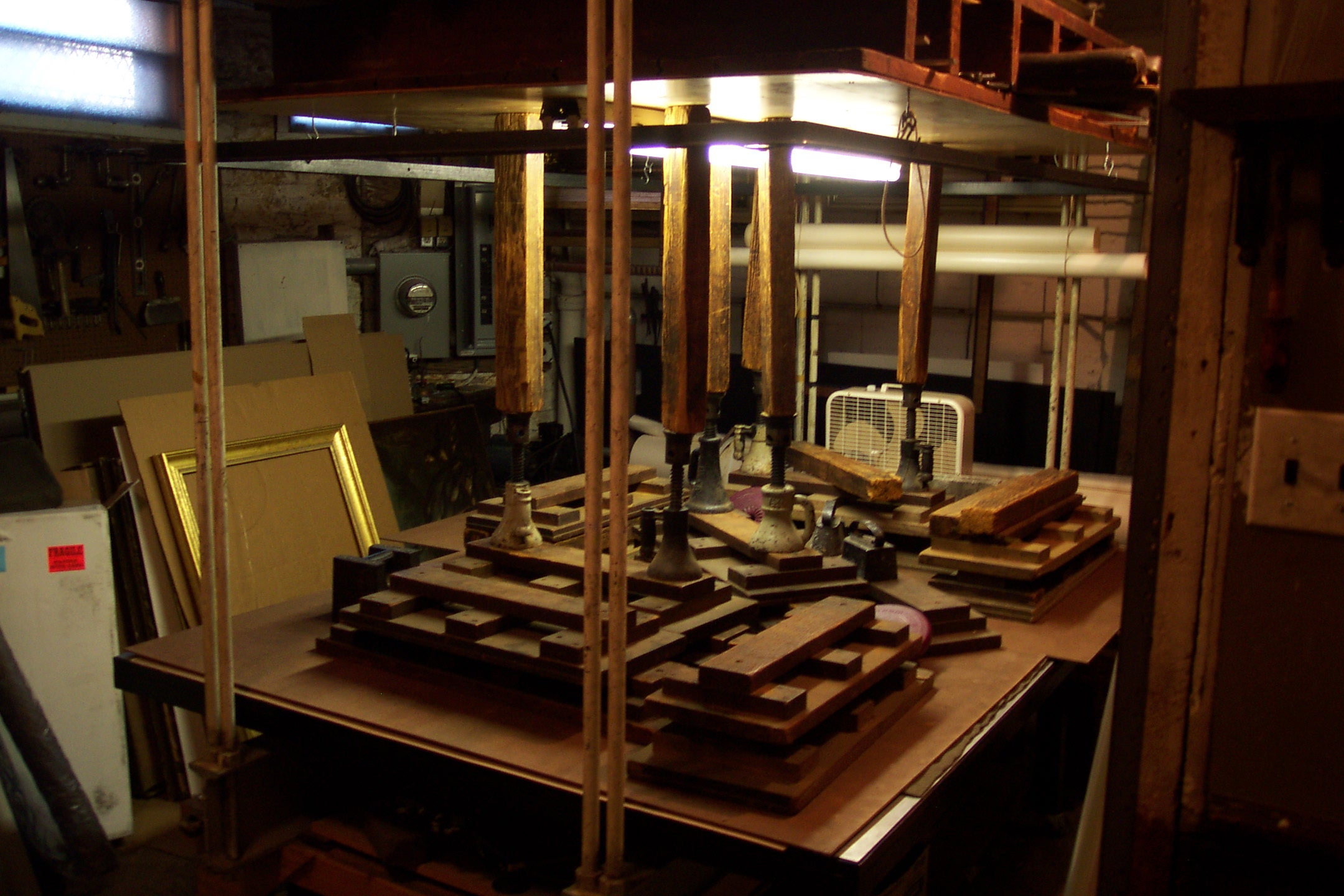
The First Vacuum Hot Table

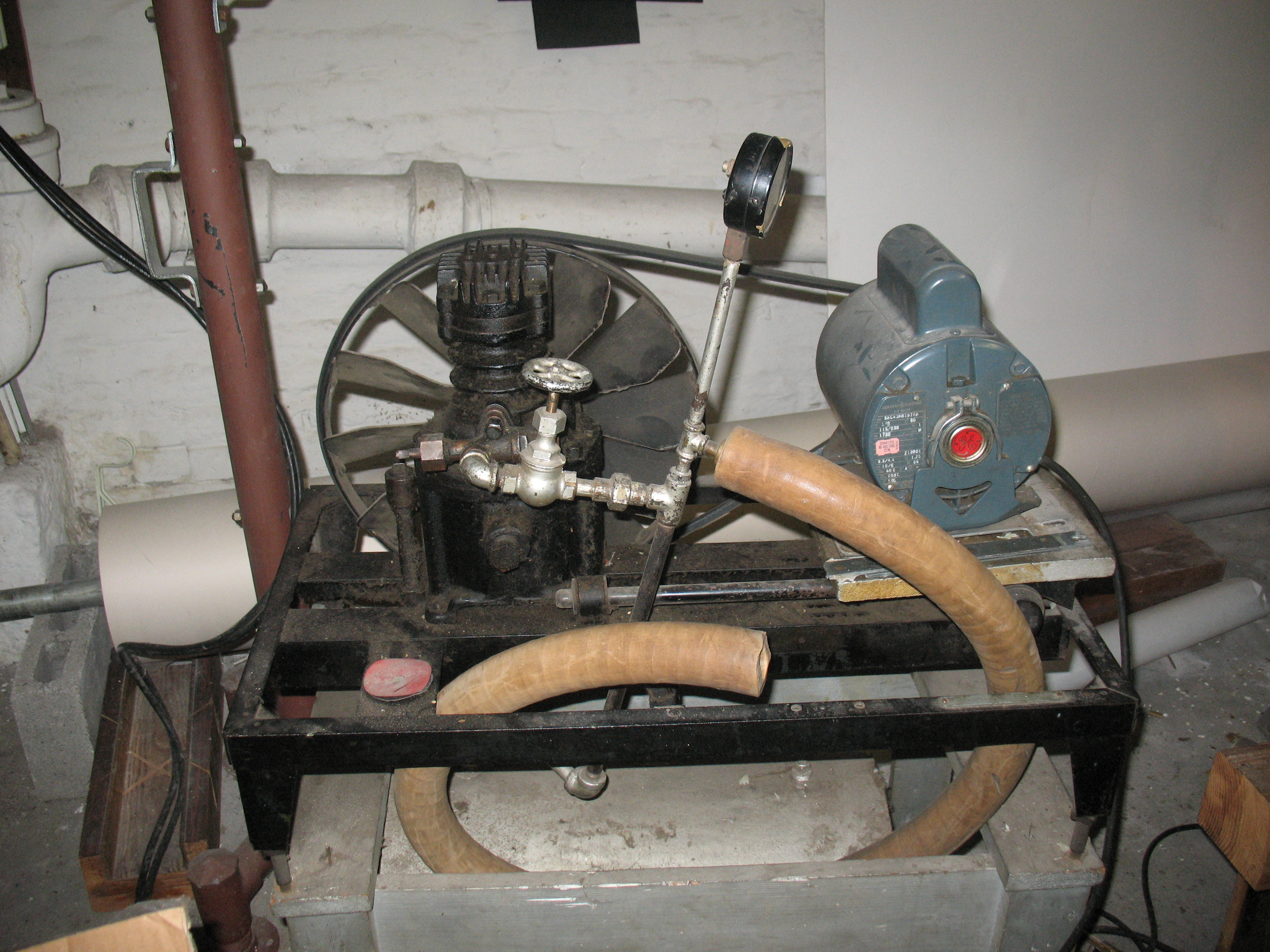
Vacuum Hot Table-Engine detail

=== Second half of 20th Century- Current ===
In 1961, the Olivers sold the business to Carroll Wales (1917–2007) and Constantine Tsaousis (1924–1987), both of whom had restored religious art in churches in the eastern Mediterranean. Notable domestic restorations of Wales and Tsaousis included Arshile Gorky's murals in Newark Airport in 1977 and the Spanish medieval art collection of the Deering family from 1971 through 1982. Over the years Mr. Wales and Mr. Tsaousis restored and conserved numerous artworks by renowned artists, including Annibale Caracci, John Singleton Copley, Francisco Goya, Giovanni Paolo Panini, Gilbert Stuart and Rembrandt Van Rain, to name a few. In 1986, Peter Tysver, an Oliver Brothers apprentice since 1968, bought the business, and in 2004, Gregory Bishop, who had been training at Oliver Brothers since 1990, became a partner. Tysver and Bishop are the two principals of today’s Oliver Brothers Art Restoration and Conservation, which remains in Boston and Beverly, Massachusetts.
