= Alexander Scott (chemist) =

British science researcher (1853–1947)

Alexander Scott FRS FRSE FCS

Director of Scientific Research, British Museum
- In office 1919–1938

Personal details
- Born: 28 December 1853 Selkirk, Scotland
- Died: 10 March 1947 (aged 93) Ringwood, Hampshire, England

Alexander Scott (28 December 1853–10 March 1947) was a Scottish chemist who served as Director of Scientific Research at the British Museum. He was President of the Chemical Society from 1915 to 1917. He determined the atomic weights of several elements: potassium (1879), sodium (1879), manganese (1881), carbon -re-evaluation (1897), tellurium (1902), nitrogen (1905).

== Life ==
He was born in Selkirk in southern Scotland on 28 December 1853 the eldest of eight children of Alexander Scott, Rector of Selkirk Academy.

From 1868 he studied science at the University of Edinburgh under Fleeming Jenkin, James Dewar and Alexander Crum Brown. He assisted James Dewar in lectures at the Dick Vet College from 1872 to 1875, and graduated with a BSc in 1876. He then took further degrees at the University of Cambridge gaining a BA in 1879 and an MA in 1882. He ended his studies in 1884 with a doctorate (DSc) back at the University of Edinburgh. He then immediately obtained a post as Science Master at Durham Secondary School.

In 1885 he was elected a Fellow of the Royal Society of Edinburgh. His proposers were Sir James Dewar, Walter Weldon, James Douglas Hamilton Dickson and Alexander Crum Brown. In 1898 he was also elected a Fellow of the Royal Society of London.

In 1891 he left Durham to become a Demonstrator in Chemistry at the University of Cambridge. In 1896 he joined the Royal Institution in London as a Researcher. From 1911 to 1919 he undertook private research. In 1919 he became Director of Scientific Research at the British Museum, one of the most prestigious jobs in his field in the world. His initial task involved studying the deterioration of multiple objects stored in "safe" but damp conditions through the war. He founded the Research Laboratory within the Museum, and in 1924 brought in Dr Harold Plenderleith as his assistant.

He retired in 1938 and died in Ringwood, Hampshire on 10 March 1947. On his death, Harold Plenderleith acted as his executor.

== Publications ==
- An Introduction to Chemical Theory (1891)

== Artistic recognition ==
His portrait by H. A. Olivier is held at the British museum.

== Family ==
He was married to Agnes Mary Russell in 1906. She was the daughter of Dr Dr William James Russell FRS. They had no children.
