= Cesare Brandi =

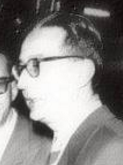
- Born: 8 April 1906; Siena
- Died: 19 January 1988; Siena
- Occupations: Art historian, historian, art critic, art theorist, poet

Cesare Brandi (Siena, 8 April 1906 – Vignano, 19 January 1988) was an art critic and historian, and a specialist in conservation-restoration theory.

In 1939 he became the first director of the Istituto Centrale per il Restauro (Central Institute for Restoration, now the Istituto Superiore per la Conservazione ed il Restauro) in Rome.

His main books are Le due vie (1966, Bari), and Teoria generale della critica (1974). Le due vie was presented and debated in Rome by Roland Barthes, Giulio Carlo Argan and Emilio Garroni. The philosopher he felt mostly closer to was Heidegger, although their positions didn't coincide; he felt also close to Derrida, particularly to his theorization of Différance.

Brandi's broad practical experience and his phenomenological references ranging from Plato to Kant, passing through Benedetto Croce, Martin Heidegger, Jean-Paul Sartre, Bergson and especially Edmund Husserl and Hegel, culminated in what became known as Theory of Critical Restoration. In 1963 Brandi published his theories in the book Teoria del Restauro (Theory of Restoration).

His theory gave rise to tratteggio, a controversial technique for repainting missing or damaged sections of works of art.

Brandi's ideas had a great influence on the Italian Restoration Letter of 1972 and, consequently, in the current practice of restoration around the world.

== Life ==
Cesare Brandi was born in Siena in Via di Città, and graduated in literature from University of Florence in 1928. In 1930 he was commissioned by the Superintendence of Monuments and Galleries of Siena to catalogue and rearrange the collection of paintings of the Academy of Fine Arts of the Tuscan city in the new headquarters of Palazzo Buonsignori.

In 1932 he dedicated his first contemporary art essay to Filippo de Pisis after visiting the artist's studio in Paris. In 1933, after being nominated Inspector in the roles of the Administration of Antiquities and Fine Arts, he worked for the Superintendency of Monuments in Bologna. The assignment lasted about three years; during this period he organized the first restoration workshop and the "Exhibition of Riminese Painting of the Fourteenth Century" (1935).

In 1936 he assumed inspection functions at the Antiquities and Fine Arts Department and was subsequently appointed Superintendent of Studies in Udine from where he was transferred to the Superintendency in the Governorate of the Italian Aegean islands. In 1938 he was recalled to the Ministry of National Education in Rome. In 1939 Giulio Carlo Argan proposed Brandi as Director of the Royal Central Institute of Restoration

For his work as a critic, Cesare Brandi won the Feltrinelli Prize, conferred by the Accademia dei Lincei, in 1958 and in 1980.

Brandi's adopted son, Vittorio Brandi Rubiu, is also an art critic and historian.
