= Journal of Cultural Heritage =

Bimonthly peer-reviewed academic journal

The Journal of Cultural Heritage is a bimonthly peer-reviewed academic journal covering all aspects of cultural heritage. It was established in 2000 and is published by Elsevier. The editor-in-chief is Patrizia Tomasin (Istituto di Chimica Inorganica e delle Superfici, Consiglio Nazionale delle Ricerche). According to the Journal Citation Reports, the journal has a 2022 impact factor of 3.1.
