= George L. Stout =

American museum director (1897–1978)

- George Leslie Stout, c. 1965, Archives of American Art
- Born: George Leslie Stout; October 5, 1897; Winterset, Iowa
- Died: July 1, 1978 (aged 80); Santa Clara, California
- Spouse: Margaret Hayes Stout
- Military career
- Branch: U.S. Naval Reserve and U.S. Army
- Awards: Bronze Star, Army Commendation Medal, Congressional Gold Medal
- Other work: Art conservation, museum director

George Leslie Stout (October 5, 1897 – July 1, 1978) was an American art conservation specialist and museum director who founded the first laboratory in the United States to study art conservation, as well as the first journal on the subject of art conservation. During World War II, he was a member of the U.S. Army unit devoted to recovering art, the Monuments, Fine Arts, and Archives section (MFAA), a.k.a. "The Monuments Men."

== Life and career ==
Stout was born on October 5, 1897, in Winterset, Iowa (which was also the birthplace of actor John Wayne). He studied at Grinnell College for two years and then served in a U.S. military hospital unit during World War I. After the war, he completed his undergraduate degree at the University of Iowa, taught painting in the art department for a couple of years, then traveled throughout Europe. In 1924, he married Margaret Hayes, with whom he had two sons, Robert and Thomas.

In 1926, Stout began work on his master's degree at Harvard University. In 1929, he graduated and started his museum career in the art conservation department of Harvard's Fogg Art Museum, where he worked as a lecturer and conservator. Along with Harvard chemist Rutherford John Gettens, Stout pioneered three major areas of art conservation: rudiments, degradation, and reparations. This helped bring art conservation work into the world of modern science. He became head of the Fogg's conservation department in 1933, a position he held until 1947. In 1942, with Rutherford John Gettens and introduced by Edward W. Forbes he published the seminal Painting Materials: A Short Encyclopaedia.

A Navy reservist for some time, Stout was placed on active duty in 1943, and soon after joined the Twelfth Army Group. Because of his art conservation background, he was one of the first recruited to the Monuments, Fine Arts, and Archives section (MFAA). The group was charged with the protection of and documentation of damages to European cultural monuments during World War II, as well as the investigation, location, recovery, and repatriation of art that had been plundered by the Nazis.

While in Europe from 1944 to 1945, he supervised the inventory and removal of several thousand art works from repositories hidden in salt mines, churches, and other locations, and was appointed as the deputy commander of the MFAA. After Japan's official surrender on September 2, 1945, Stout and fellow Monuments Man Laurence Sickman recommended creating a MFAA division in Tokyo. Consequently, the Arts and Monuments Division of the Civil Information and Education Section, GHQ, Supreme Commander of the Allied Powers was established. Stout was the Chief of the Division from approximately August 1945 until the middle of 1946.

After the war, Stout subsequently directed the Worcester Art Museum in Worcester, Massachusetts, from 1947 to 1954, and the Isabella Stewart Gardner Museum, in Boston, Massachusetts, from 1955 to 1970. Stout was also instrumental in the founding of the International Institute for Conservation (IIC) and was its first president, from 1950 to 1953 and served on its Council until 1963. Stout was made an Honorary Fellow of IIC in 1966.

In 1975, he was inducted as an honorary member of the American Institute for Conservation of Historic and Artistic Works for his accomplishments.

Stout died on July 1, 1978, in Santa Clara, California.

== Quotes ==
"I have to admit that man's growth toward civilization looks slow and unsteady. At moments, whole nations seem to fall back, their people fret for deliverance from selfish fears. They pay homage to persons who have snatched power for themselves, all manner of tyrants, and people beg them for comfort and for peace. But when I look beyond the weak spots, I can notice those men who pursue knowledge for the common benefit, or labor for sound structures rather than for gain, or fight and die—not for praise or possessions but for the freedom of others. These are not strange or distant to men."

== Legacy ==
Actor George Clooney played a fictional character Frank Stokes loosely based on Stout in the 2014 film The Monuments Men.

== Selected publications ==
International Congress of the History of Art, Stout, G. L., & Fogg Art Museum. (1930). "Technical research at the Fogg Art Museum, Harvard University." Bruxelles: Musées Royaux des Beaux-Arts de Belgique.

Gettens, R. J., & Stout, G. L. (1947). Painting materials, a short encyclopaedia. New York: D. Van Nostrand Co.

Stout, G. L., & Isabella Stewart Gardner Museum. (1969). Treasures from the Isabella Stewart Gardner Museum. New York: Crown Publishers.

Stout, G. L. (1975). The care of pictures. New York: Dover Publications.
