= Rutherford John Gettens =

American chemist and conservation scientist

Rutherford John Gettens (January 17, 1900 – June 17, 1974) was a chemist and pioneering conservation scientist.

Born to Daniel and Clara (Rutherford) Gettens, Rutherford John Gettens grew up in Mooers, New York, where he became valedictorian of his high school class in 1918. He received his B.S. from Middlebury College in 1923. On graduating, he taught chemistry at Colby College, Maine, before receiving his M.A. from Harvard University in 1929.

In 1928, Gettens began working at the Fogg Art Museum at Harvard, and by 1949, he was chief of Museum Technical Research, and an active member in the development of the field of conservation as we know it today. In 1951, Gettens began the establishment of a 'Technical Laboratory' at the Freer Gallery of Art in Washington, DC. The laboratory was designed to conduct technical research as well as undertake conservation treatments of museum objects. By 1961, he had been appointed head curator of the laboratory and after his retirement in 1968, he served as a research consultant until his death.

Gettens was a founding member of the International Institute for Conservation of Historic and Artistic Works, which was incorporated in 1948. He was later to serve as council member and vice president, as well as president from 1968 to 1971. He was Coordinator of Working Groups for the International Council of Museums, a consulting fellow at the Conservation Center of the Institute of Fine Arts at New York University, and on the science advisory board of the Winterthur Museum. He also received a Fulbright lectureship in Greece, and was the inspiration behind the American Institute for Conservation Oral History Project.

He wrote extensively in the conservation field. His works include The Freer Chinese Bronzes (Volume II), and, with George L. Stout the seminal, Painting Materials: A Short Encyclopedia.

== Bibliography ==
- Abstracts of Technical Studies in Art and Archaeology, 1943-1952 (with Bertha M. Usilton)
- Painting Materials: A Short Encyclopaedia (with George Stout)
- Minerals in Art and Archaeology
- The Freer Chinese Bronzes: Volume II, Technical Studies
- Study of Sources of Contamination in the Analysis of Radioactive Materials
