= Harold Plenderleith =

Scottish art conservator and archaeologist

Harold James Plenderleith MC FRSE FCS (19 September 1898 – 2 November 1997) was a 20th century Scottish art conservator and archaeologist. He was a large and jovial character with a strong Dundonian accent.

== Biography ==
Harold Plenderleith was born in Coatbridge on 19 September 1898. He was the eldest child of Robert James Plenderleith who was art master at Harris Academy in Dundee and Harold was consequently educated there, also being school dux. His younger brother was Robert Waldron Plenderleith FRSE.

He then joined University College in St Andrews in 1916 but after two terms went to officer training school due to the First World War becoming a Lieutenant in the Lancashire Fusiliers in 1917. He served on the Western Front from August 1917. He received a shrapnel wound in the arm on the Ypres Salient. He was awarded the Military Cross in 1918 for a successful night raid on a German pillbox.

In 1919 he then returned to study Chemistry at University College, Dundee and graduated with a BSc in 1921 and gained his doctorate in 1923. In 1924, he began to work at the British Museum with Alexander Scott in the newly created Department of Scientific and Industrial Research. This department had been created by the museum to address objects in the collection that had begun to rapidly deteriorate as a result of being stored in the London Underground railway tunnels during the First World War. Scott and Plenderleith began applying their knowledge of Chemistry to the deterioration of museum objects and began scientific conservation in the United Kingdom. As an archaeologist he was involved in the excavations of the tomb of Tutankhamun in Egypt, Sir Leonard Woolley's site at Ur, and the Sutton Hoo ship burial.

In 1934 he was elected a Fellow of the Royal Society of Edinburgh. His proposers were Alexander Scott, Arthur Pillans Laurie, Sir James Irvine and William Peddie.

In the Second World War he worked with Sir John Forsdyke on the relocation of precious artefacts from the British Museum into mines and quarries in Wales to avoid bomb damage. On the night of 10-11 May 1941 when the British Museum was bombed, he crawled "like a snake" into a burning book storage area to investigate the damage.

Plenderleith retired from the British Museum in 1959 to become the first director of the International Center for the study of the Preservation and Restoration of Cultural Property (ICCROM). He was the director of ICCROM until 1971. He helped set up and then served on the Council of the International Institute for Conservation from its creation in 1950 until 1971 and was IIC's President from 1965 to 1968. He received many medals throughout his career, including: the Gold Medal of the Society of Antiquaries in 1964; Unesco Bronze Medal, 1971; the Conservation Service Award of the U.S. Department of the Interior, 1976 and the ICCROM Award, Rome, 1979.

He died in Inverness on 2 November 1997 aged 99.

== Family ==
He was married twice. Firstly (and for over 50 years) he was married in 1926 to Elizabeth K S Smyth. Following Elizabeth's death in 1982, in 1988, aged 90, he married Margaret MacLennan (nee MacLeod). He had four stepchildren by his second marriage but no biological children by either marriage.

== Publications ==
=== Books ===
- The Conservation of Antiquities and Works of Art: Treatment, Repair and Restoration by Harold James Plenderleith, A. E. A. Werner. Oxford Univ Pr, ISBN 0-19-212960-0 (0-19-212960-0)
- The Preservation of Leather Bookbindings by H. J. Plenderleith. British Museum, ISBN 0-7141-0227-X (0-7141-0227-X)
- Qumran Cave 1 by George L. Harding, D. Barthelemy, J. T. Milik, R. De Vaux, G. M. Crowfoot, Harold James Plenderleith. Oxford Univ Pr, ISBN 0-19-826301-5 (0-19-826301-5)

=== Chapters ===
- Maryon, Herbert & Plenderleith, H. J. (1954). "Fine Metal-Work". In Singer, Charles; Holmyard, E. J. & Hall, A. R. (eds.). A History of Technology: From Early Times to Fall of Ancient Empires. Vol. 1. London: Oxford University Press. pp. 623–662.

=== Articles ===
- Plenderleith, H. J. & Maryon, Herbert (January 1959). "The Royal Bronze Effigies in Westminster Abbey". The Antiquaries Journal. XXXIX (1–2). Society of Antiquaries of London: 87–90. doi:10.1017/S0003581500083633. S2CID 163228818.
- Plenderleith, H. J. (1998). "A History of Conservation". Studies in Conservation. 43 (3). International Institute for Conservation of Historic and Artistic Work: 129–143. doi:10.1179/sic.1998.43.3.129. JSTOR 1506740.

== Honours and awards ==
- Gold Medal of the Society of Antiquaries in 1964.
- Unesco Bronze Medal, 1971.
- The Conservation Service Award of the U.S. Department of the Interior, 1976.
- The ICCROM Award, Rome, 1979.

== Memorial lecture ==
Since Plenderleith's death, the Scottish Society for Conservation and Restoration (SSCR) have organised an annual Plenderleith Memorial Lecture, the SSCR merged with several other organizations in 2005 to form the Institute of Conservation, and today the lecture continues annually under the auspices of the Committee of the Icon Scotland Group.
