= Vignano =

- Frazione
- Location of Vignano in Italy
- Coordinates: 43°19′48″N 11°21′38″E
- Country: Italy
- Region: Tuscany
- Province: Siena (SI)
- Comune: Siena
- Elevation: 327 m (1,073 ft)
- Time zone: UTC+1 (CET)
  - Summer (DST): UTC+2 (CEST)

Vignano is a village in Tuscany, central Italy, in the comune of Siena, province of Siena.

Vignano is about 10 km from Siena.

== Main sights ==
- Sant'Agnese a Vignano, parish church of the village

== Bibliography ==
- Emanuele Repetti (1843). "Vignano delle Masse di S. Martino". Dizionario geografico fisico storico della Toscana. Vol. 5. Florence. pp. 770–771.
