= International Institute for Conservation of Historic and Artistic Works =

- International Institute for Conservation of Historic and Artistic Works (IIC)
- Founded: 1950
- Headquarters: London, United Kingdom
- Affiliations: Learned society
- Website: www.iiconservation.org

The International Institute for Conservation of Historic and Artistic Works (IIC) is a global organisation for conservation and restoration professionals with over two thousand members in over fifty countries. IIC seeks to promote the knowledge, methods and working standards needed to protect and preserve historic and artistic works throughout the world.

== Organisation and governance ==
The current Council of the institute (2026) is:

Governance:

- President - Juergen Vervoorst (National Archives, UK)
- President Emeritus Julian Bickersteth (International Conservation Services Pty Ltd, AU)
- Secretary-General, Vacant
- Treasurer, James Brooke Turner (UK)
- Director, Chair of Publications Committee Joyce Townsend (Tate, UK)
- Director, Chair of Congress Tom Learner (Getty Conservation Institute, US)
- Director, Legal and Governance Helen Griffiths (UK)
- Director, Chair of Fellowships David Saunders (Honorary Research Fellow, UK)
- Director, Chair of Professional Development and Standards Rachel Rivenc (Getty Research Institute, US)
- Director, Chair of Emerging Professionals Meaghan Monaghan (Art Gallery of Ontario, CA)
- Director, Communications Mariana Escamilla Martínez (Studio Redivivus, NL)
- Director, in charge of Awards and Grants Committee, Vacant
- Deputy President, Luiz Souza, Ordinary Member of Council (School of Fine Arts Federal University of Minas Gerais, BR)
- Directors and Ordinary Members of Council Duygu Camurcuoglu (British Museum, UK); Amber Kerr (Lunder Conservation Centre, Smithsonian American Art, US) Luiz Souza, (School of Fine Arts Federal University of Minas Gerais, BR)
- Honorary Member of Council Jirong Song (Palace Museum, Beijing, China)

IIC's Council attempts to reflect the geographical and professional balance of the worldwide conservation profession. Council members, including the secretary-general and treasurer, are volunteers, as are the editors of Studies in Conservation and IIC's Congress preprints. The institute has a permanent secretariat in London with a staff of three.

IIC co-operates closely with other organisations in the field, notably the International Centre for the Study of the Preservation and Restoration of Cultural Property and the Committee for Conservation of the International Council of Museums (ICOM) as well as national and regional conservation groups.

IIC is a learned society and is also registered with the Charity Commission for England and Wales.

== Background ==
In 1930, the International Museums Office of the League of Nations held a conference in Rome on the examination and conservation of works of art. Following this meeting, the Museums Office issued a series of publications on the subject. In 1932 a technical journal of conservation studies, Technical Studies in the Field of the Fine Arts, was established by the Fogg Museum (Harvard University), under the managing editorship of George L. Stout. It continued publication until 1942.

The work of the Monuments, Fine Arts, and Archives program and the repatriation of art treasures after World War II brought together experts from Europe and the United States. They proposed the revival of Technical Studies and the formation of an international body of conservators to continue the interchange of information on the care and conservation of works of art. Between 1946 and 1948 a series of meetings was held to discuss these proposals. Foremost among those involved in the meetings were George L. Stout, W.G. Constable (Boston), Ian Rawlins (London), and Paul Coremans (Brussels).

In December 1948 at a meeting of the ICOM Commission on the Care of Paintings in London, it was announced that a new international institute for conservation was about to be incorporated with offices in London and that its interests would be the scientific and technical study of the subject.

== Early history ==
On April 27, 1950, the International Institute for the Conservation of Museum Objects (which acquired its present name in 1959) was incorporated as a limited company in the United Kingdom. Its aims were "to improve the state of knowledge and standards of practice and to provide a common meeting ground and publishing body for all who are interested in and professionally skilled in the conservation of museum objects”. The institute was to be concerned with:

- The status of conservators, by forming a professional self-electing body
- Publications: abstracts of the technical literature, and original work with a scientific bias - the end of the "secrets of the Old Masters"
- Training, with the aim of raising standards.

The office was established with the help of a grant from the Nuffield Foundation. London was chosen as the "midpoint" between the United States and continental Europe. Office space was provided free by the Trustees of the National Gallery (London). The Institute moved to its own independent offices in 1968.

The membership was to consist of Fellows who were to be persons highly qualified in (or in positions of great authority in) conservation and Associates who were to be "persons anxious to promote the objects of the Institute". Later a category of Institutional Members was introduced.

When the IIC was founded in 1950, the Founder Fellows were George L. Stout, Rutherford J. Gettens, Richard Buck, W.G. Constable, Murray Pease, Ian Rawlins, Harold Plenderleith, Sir Wallace Akers, Helmut Ruhemann, and Paul Coremans. Others who joined in that first year included Arthur van Schendel, René Sneyers, and Sheldon and Caroline Keck. George Stout became the IIC's first president, with Harold Plenderleith its treasurer and Ian Rawlins its secretary-general.

The IIC membership grew quickly. In October 1952 there were 62 members (38 of them Fellows) with 64 candidates for associate membership in process of election; by March 1952, there were 167 members (50 of them Fellows).

== Membership ==
- IIC Fellows are senior members of the profession who are elected by the existing body of Fellows. Fellowship of IIC is open to all members who are actively engaged in the profession of conservation. Fellows must be able to demonstrate commitment to the profession and to show that they keep up-to-date with relevant developments. Indicators include publications, voluntary service to conservation organisations, participation in conferences and training events, membership of other relevant professional bodies, and accreditation by a national organisation.
- IIC Individual membership is open to those working in conservation and with an interest in conserving the world's heritage.
- Student membership of IIC is for those enrolled in a full-time programme of education, training or work experience under the supervision of a professional conservator.
- Institutional IIC membership is intended for museum and galleries, libraries and archives, conservation schools, research institutes and commercial firms.

== Publications & Communications ==
In May 1952, the first issue of the IIC Newsletter appeared; this later became the IIC Bulletin and in turn was succeeded in 2007 by News in Conservation. In October 1952, Studies in Conservation began publication. IIC Abstracts, an international journal of abstracts of the technical literature and the forerunner of Art and Archaeology Technical Abstracts, was first published in 1955. With changing editorship, it ran for five volumes ending with Vol.5, no.4 (Autumn 1965). In 2000, the first volume of the annual Reviews in Conservation was published and this was published until Vol. 10 in 2009..

=== Studies in Conservation ===
Studies in Conservation is a peer-reviewed academic journal, produced eight times a year, on the conservation of historic and artistic works. Studies in Conservation publishes original work on a range of subjects including, but not limited to, advances in conservation practice, novel methods of treatment, preventive conservation, issues of collection care, conservation history and ethics, examination methods for works of art, new research in the analysis of artistic materials or mechanisms of deterioration, and conservation issues in display and storage.

=== Reviews in Conservation ===
Published annually from 2000 until 2010, Reviews in Conservation has now been incorporated into Studies in Conservation.

=== News in Conservation ===
News in Conservation is published electronically every other month. It aims to provide a place where opinions, news, and information can be shared and discussed. Free to the general public for download from the IIC web-site, News in Conservation contains news from the IIC Council and regional groups, as well as job vacancies, conference listings, and notices, along with a mixture of news stories, features, interviews, and other articles relating to all aspects of conservation in every issue.

=== Social Networking ===
IIC operates a Facebook page and X and LinkedIn presence as well as a discussion group on LinkedIn.

== Biennial Congresses ==
In 1961, with the help of a grant from the Gulbenkian Foundation, the IIC held its first international conference. That meeting, in Rome, was attended by 150 people, and the papers were published by Butterworths under the title Recent Advances in Conservation. Subsequently, conferences have been held at two- or three-year intervals with published preprints on a topic of current interest. Past conferences are:

- Recent Advances in Conservation (Rome 1961)
- Textile Conservation (Delft 1964)
- Museum Climatology (London 1967)
- Stone and Wooden Objects (New York 1970)
- Paintings and the Graphic Arts (Lisbon 1972)
- Archaeology and the Applied Arts (Stockholm 1975)
- Wood in Painting and the Decorative Arts (Oxford 1978)
- Conservation Within Historic Buildings (Vienna 1980)
- Science and Technology (Washington 1982)
- Adhesives and Consolidants (Paris 1984)
- Cleaning, Retouching and Coatings (Brussels 1990)
- Stone and Wall Paintings (Bologna 1986)
- Far Eastern Art (Kyoto 1988)
- Iberian and Latin American Cultural Heritage (Madrid 1992)
- Preventive Conservation (Ottawa 1994)
- Archaeological Conservation and its Consequences (Copenhagen 1996)
- Painting Techniques: History, Materials and Studio Practice (Dublin 1998)
- Tradition and Innovation: Advances in Conservation (Melbourne 2000)
- Works of Art on Paper. Books, Documents and Photographs. Techniques and Conservation (Baltimore 2002)
- Modern Art: New Museums (Bilbao 2004)
- The Object in Context: Crossing Conservation Boundaries (Munich 2006)
- Conservation and Access (London 2008)
- Conservation and the Eastern Mediterranean (Istanbul 2010)
- The Decorative: Conservation and the Applied Arts (Vienna 2012)
- An Unbroken History: Conserving East Asian Works of Art and Heritage (Hong Kong 2014)
- Saving the Now: Crossing Boundaries to Conserve Contemporary Works (Los Angeles 2016)
- Preventive Conservation: The State of the Art (Turin, 2018)
- Current Practices and Challenges in Built Heritage Conservation (Edinburgh 2020, Online)
- Conservation and Change: Response, Adaptation, and Leadership (New Zealand 2022, Hybrid congress)

== Student & Emerging Conservator Conferences ==
In 2011 IIC instigated its Student & Emerging Conservator Conference series. These events help recent graduates and those still studying conservation to develop their skills and gain career insights. They offer networking opportunities and panel discussions with webcasts, studio visits and a social programme.

The first conference in this series was

- Conservation: Futures and Responsibilities (London 2011)

This was followed by:

- Conservation: Obstacles or Opportunities? (Copenhagen, 2013)
- Conservation: Making the Transition (Warsaw 2015)
- Head, Hands & Heart (Bern, 2017)
- The Conservator's Reflection (Cologne, 2019)
- The Faces of Conservation (Lisbon, 2021 Online)

== Regional groups ==
IIC's Regional Groups began in 1958. Regional Groups are independent associations affiliated or associated with IIC. A Regional Group is required to adhere to the aims and objectives of the IIC as expressed in the Memorandum of Association. Its by-laws must be approved by the IIC Council and its officers should be members of IIC. The first Regional Groups formed were the IIC-United Kingdom Group (now Icon, the Institute of Conservation) and the IIC-American Group (now the American Institute for Conservation). There are currently Regional Groups in Scandinavia, Austria, Croatia, France, Greece, Italy, Japan, and Spain.

== Sustainability and Environmental Guidelines ==
=== Positioning Statement ===
Following Our Common Future: Report of the World Commission on Environment and Development (1987), also known as 'The Brundtland Report', and Stephen Dovers, former Director of the Fenner School of Environment and Society at the Australian National University, the IIC understands sustainability to comprise seven 'Interlocking Crises': Biodiversity Loss; Climate Change; Global Security; Pollution and Wastes; Population; Poverty and Development; and Resource Use.

=== IIC Environmental Sustainability Statement and Carbon Analysis ===
IIC aims to decrease its carbon footprint as far as practicably possible. 2030 is the deadline for Scope 1 and 2 emissions with Scope 3 emissions for 2050.

=== IIC and ICOM-CC Joint Declaration for Environmental Guidelines ===
A joint declaration on environmental guidelines between the International Institute for Conservation (IIC) and the International Council of Museums, Committee for Conservation (ICOM-CC) was published in September 2014, following discussion at the ICOM-CC Melbourne Conference (September 15–19, 2014) and IIC Hong Kong Congress (September 22–26, 2014). The declaration covers:

- Sustainability and Management
- Museum Environment
- Loans
- Existing Guidelines

=== IIC, ICOM-CC and ICCROM Joint Commitment for Climate Action ===
This agreement between the International Institute for Conservation (IIC), the International Council of Museums - Committee for Conservation (ICOM-CC) and the International Centre for the Study of the Preservation and Restoration of Cultural Property (ICCROM) organizes an international coalition to make changes and act towards sustainability and net zero initiatives.

=== MoU with Climate Heritage Network ===
IIC has signed an MoU with the Climate Heritage Network to help mitigate issues related to climate change.

== See also ==
- Cultural heritage
- Art conservation and restoration
- List of dates in the history of conservation and restoration
- Conservation Associations and Professional Organizations
