= American Institute for Conservation =

American professional organization

- American Institute for Conservation (AIC)
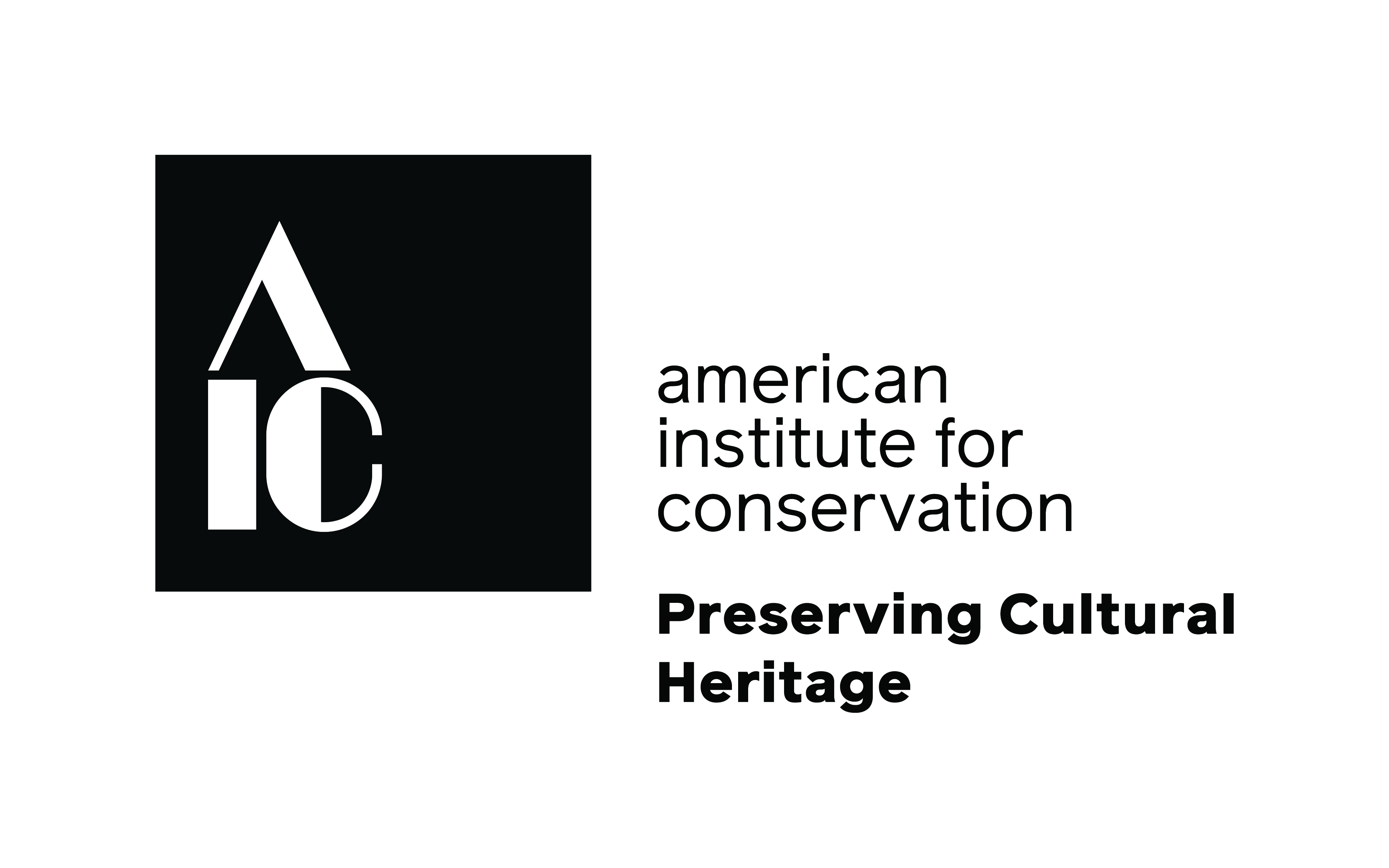
- Founded: 1972; 54 years ago
- Affiliations: Professional association
- Website: www.culturalheritage.org

The American Institute for Conservation (AIC) is a national membership organization of conservation professionals, headquartered in Washington, D.C.

== History ==
The AIC first launched in 1972 with only a handful of members. Now it is grown to over 3,500 members in over twenty countries around the world.

== Foundation ==
The Foundation for Advancement in Conservation (FAIC) was incorporated in 1972 to support the charitable, scientific, and educational activities of the AIC. FAIC receives donations and grants to undertake and underwrite efforts that advance the field of conservation, support AIC members in their professional endeavors, and help people care for their collections.

== Publications ==
The AIC publications include The Journal of the American Institute for Conservation, AIC News, and Specialty Group Publications.
