= Storage of cultural property =

Collections care

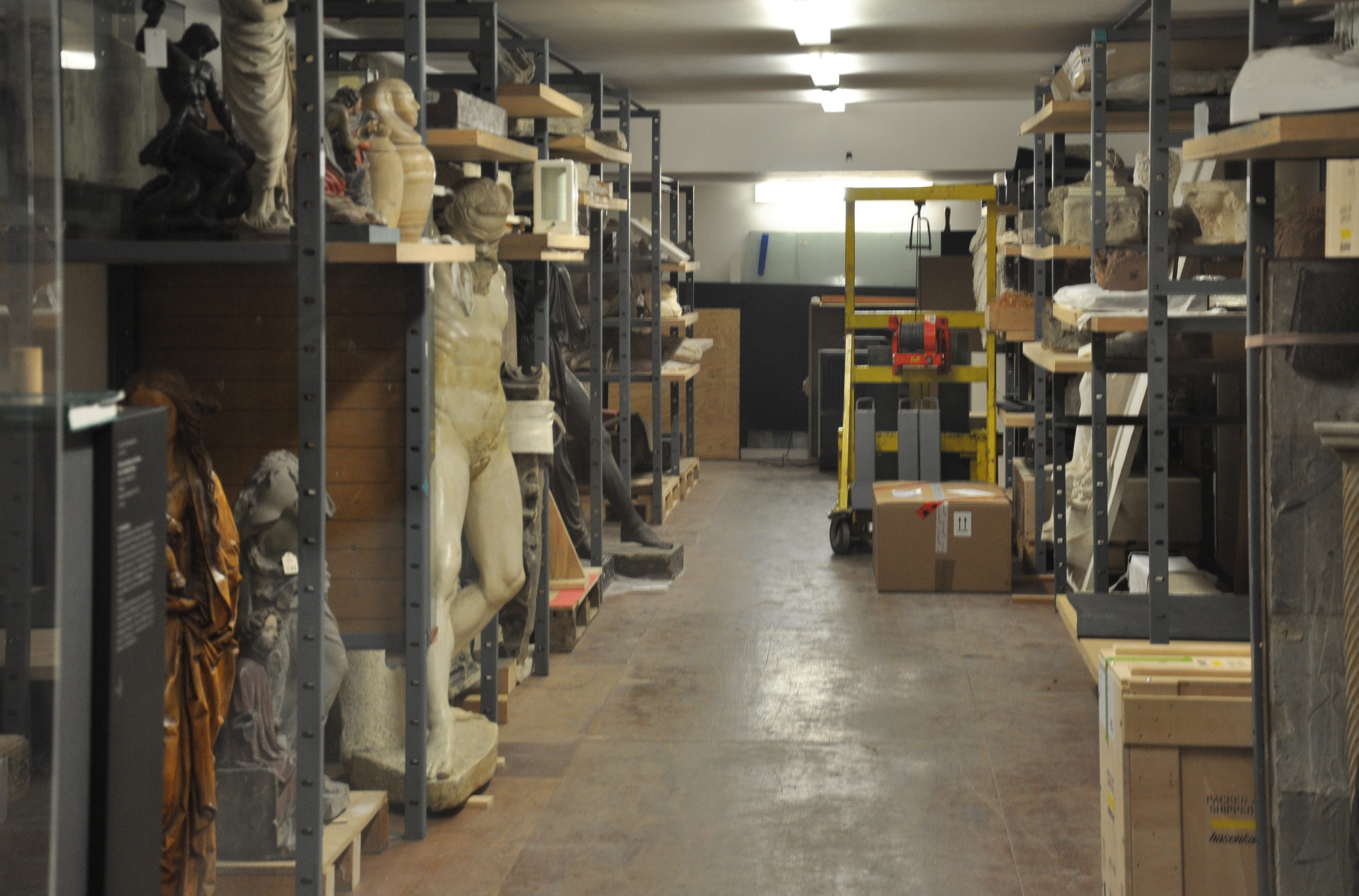
Liebieghaus Depot collection storage

Storage of cultural property typically falls to the responsibility of cultural heritage institutions, or individuals. The proper storage of these objects can help to ensure a longer lifespan for the object with minimal damage or degradation. With so many different types of artifacts, materials, and combinations of materials, keepers of these artifacts often have considerable knowledge of the best practices in storing these objects to preserve their original state.

== Storage spaces ==
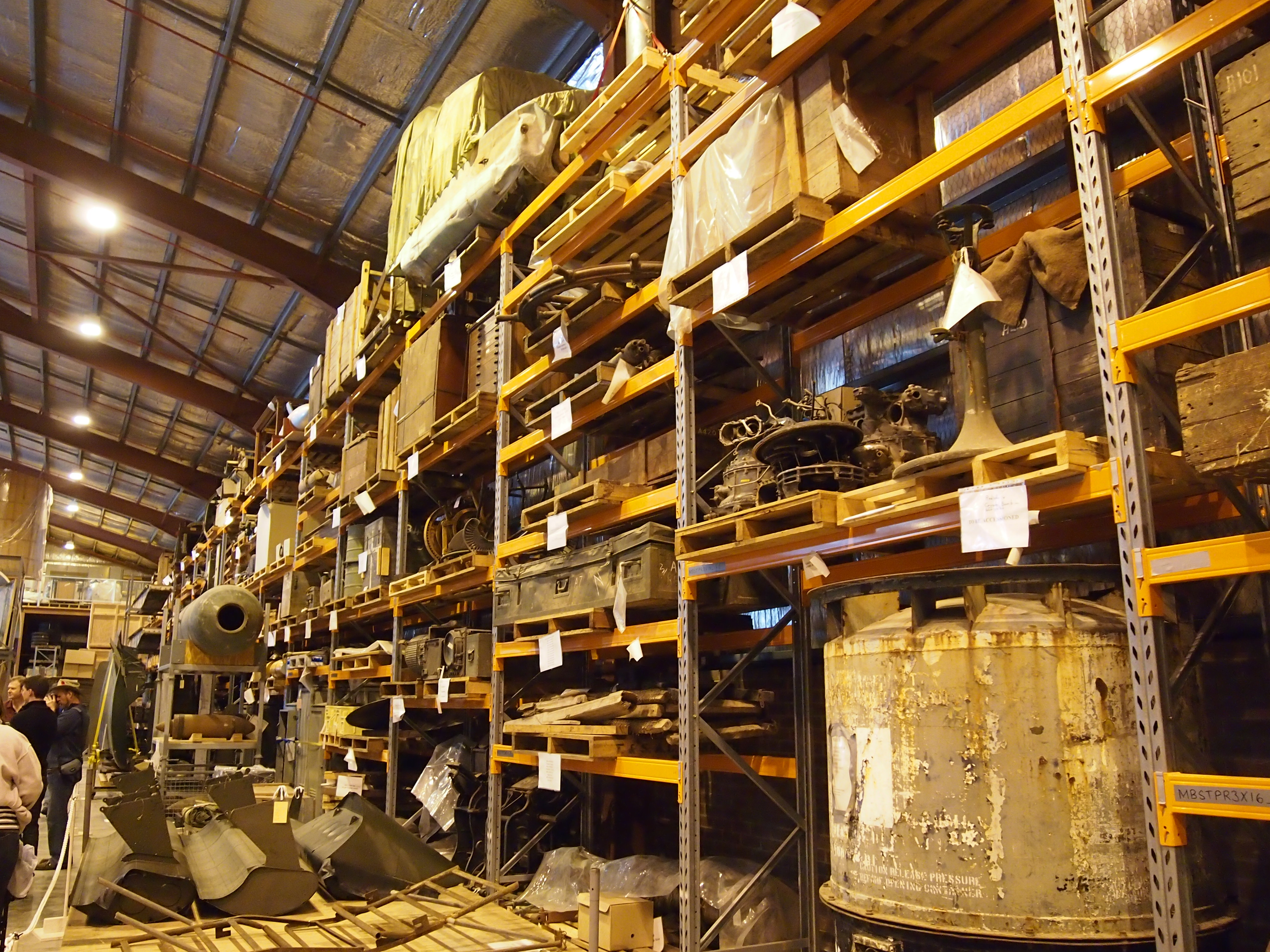
Items being stored on shelves and the floor at the Australian War Memorial's Treloar Resource Centre

The process involved when creating a collections storage area usually involves determining the available resources, the needs of the specific collection, how the collection will be used, and the necessary space required based on the current collection and potential future acquisitions. The accessibility of objects in storage, as well as the need to retrieve them, will have an effect on the type of storage space desired. If only a small portion of the collection is regularly utilized, then a separate more easily accessible storage space may be chosen for these objects, while less utilized objects may be held in a less accessible area of the building, or an offsite facility. In either case, collections storage spaces are typically separate from all other activity in order to decrease the potential for damage to the collection from theft, tracked in soil, excessive light exposure, etc.

A well designed collections storage space is multi-layered, beginning with the building itself, a room, storage furniture, and packaging. The more layers utilized the greater the protection from agents of deterioration. It is generally agreed that storage spaces should not be at the top of the building or below grade, but attics and basements are often the most practical space for storage, so many institutions weigh the risks, and opt to upgrade these spaces in terms of structure, insulation, and/or vapor barriers to create a suitable space for storage.

The type and size of the objects in the collection also help to determine where and how the storage space is set up. If the collection has many large heavy items, like furniture, the storage spaces typically have low shelving for these items, and require wide aisles to move the objects, especially if they require large equipment like a forklift to be moved. In these cases, the doorways must be large enough to accommodate these large objects, and the floor structure must be reinforced to hold the weight of the collection. If a collection consists of mostly small objects, then cabinets and shelving are a practical solution, while a collection of two-dimensional works might require flat drawers and hanging racks.

== Environmental control ==
The climate control systems in collections storage typically include the control of temperature, relative humidity, and a ventilation and filtration system to remove atmospheric pollutants like dust, chemicals, and micro-organisms. The basic idea of climate control is to keep the temperature and relative humidity at a steady rate so as to avoid expansion and contraction of materials, which can cause serious damage. Climate control is typically achieved by utilizing an HVAC system, though depending on weather patterns, these systems can often require a great deal of energy to run, which is a concern for many institutions.

=== Temperature ===
Generally, keeping a lower temperature is better for collections storage, because chemical and biological reactions tend to increase as the temperature increases and structural damage is possible to objects made of materials such as wax, at high temperatures. In general objects collections temperature can range between 59 and 77 °F (15 and 25 °C), but fluctuations should be minimized. For some collections, there are specified temperature suggestions to protect delicate materials. For example, furs, paper archives, and textiles may be stored at a lower temperature between 41 and 50 °F (5 and 10 °C), and cellulose nitrate film is often isolated and stored below freezing, as it has the potential to ignite at 106 °F.

=== Relative humidity ===
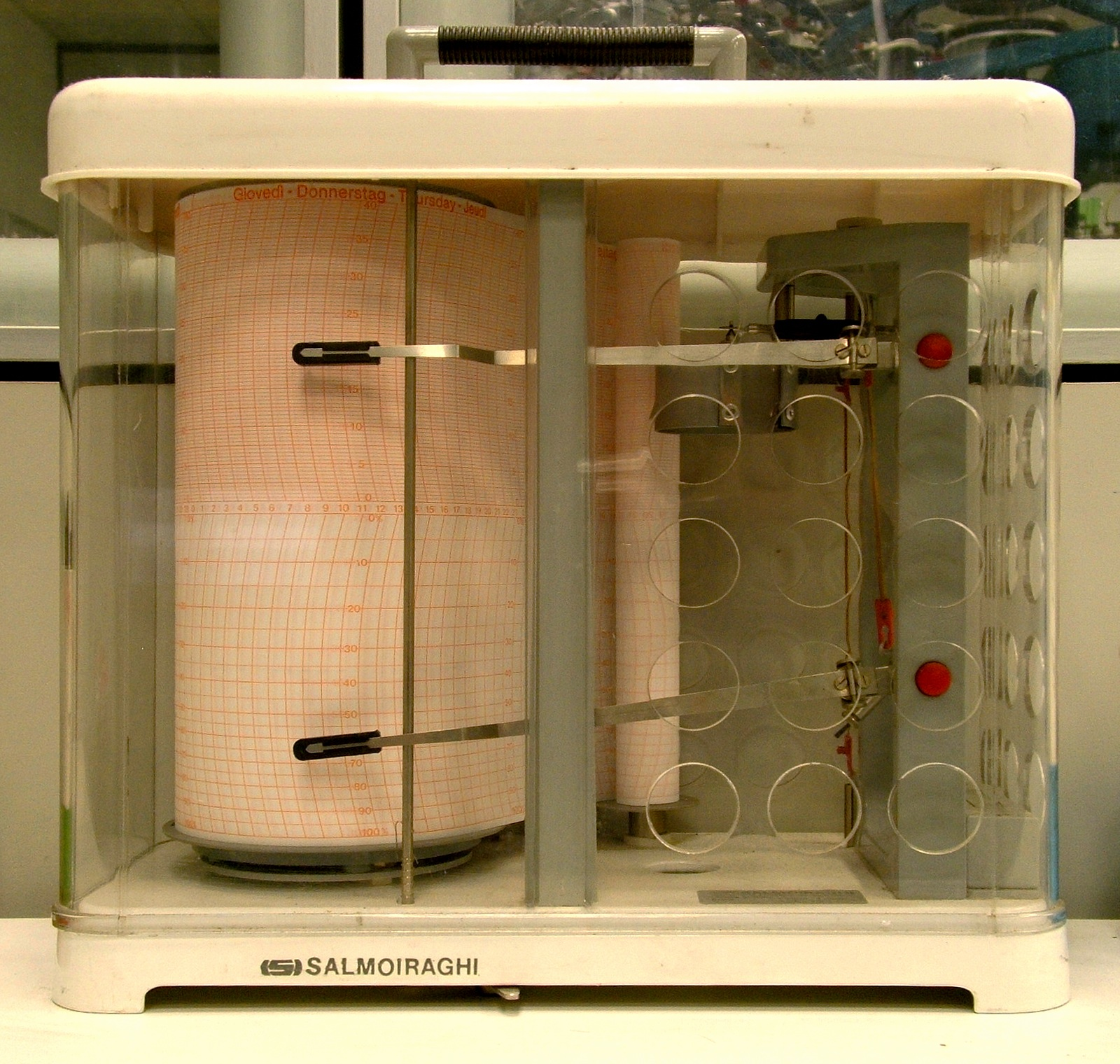
Hygrothermograph

For collections with a combination of objects, humidity values within 45-55% - with an allowable drift of +/-5% - should be targeted. Short-term fluctuations should be reduced as much as possible. Over the year, seasonal values in the range of 40-60% are also acceptable. As with temperature control, the main goal of the control of relative humidity to is avoid major fluctuations which can cause physical damage to objects, with long term seasonal changes causing greater damage than short term changes. Hygroscopic materials such as wood, textiles, and bone, are especially sensitive to changes in humidity, as they swell and shrink according to the environment, which will cause deterioration over time. Mold growth occurs only when the relative humidity is about 70% or higher, and insect infestation is more common with a high relative humidity. A very low relative humidity, of about 35% or lower, can cause embrittlement of paper and adhesives, as well as cracking and warping of wood and ivory. Many museum objects are constructed of multiple materials, so in order to provide an appropriate relative humidity for the object as a whole, certain materials may be compromised.

=== Monitoring Climate ===
An ongoing monitoring system is essential to the preventive care of objects in collections storage, as it helps to identify any problems, evaluate the effectiveness of corrective measures, and document the effect of extraordinary events such as water leaks, long periods of drought, or heavy rains. Hygrothermographs are a tool that constantly monitors both the temperature and relative humidity, and are fairly reliable if properly calibrated, a task that must be completed at least every three months if not more frequently. The value with these devices is that they constantly record the data onto graphs that can be analyzed at a later time. Hygrometers, thermometers, and thermohygrometers are also useful for determining the temperature and relative humidity of a space, but the most reliable tool is a psychrometer. Data loggers are becoming more popular in institutions as they are small, record data at desired intervals, and allow the data to be easily transferred to a computer in multiple formats including graphs and tables, which allows for easy collection and assessment of the data.

== Lighting ==
Because damage from visible light and ultraviolet radiation is cumulative and irreversible, collections storage spaces tend to have few ambient light sources, such as windows, and often have lighting installed in multiple zones controlled by different switches, so that all of the lights do not have to be turned on when only a small area of the storage space is actively being used. LED or UV-filtered fluorescent bulbs are generally recommended, as they save energy compared to incandescent bulbs, while quartz and halogen bulbs emit high levels of UV and infrared radiation as well as a significant amount of heat, which can cause increased deterioration of objects in the space.

== Integrated pest management ==
Integrated pest management (IPM) is an intensive program that monitors for pests, such as insects and rodents, which may harm collections. This method utilizes traps to monitor the types of pests entering storage spaces, and to eliminate pest entrances and attractors. Chemical treatments for pests are generally only utilized as a last resort, and with the advice of a professional, because they add toxic and potentially harmful chemicals to the storage space. To avoid attracting pests, collecting institutions typically avoid having exterior lighting focused around doors and windows, when possible, and also avoid using mercury vapor or tungsten lights.

== Storage furniture ==
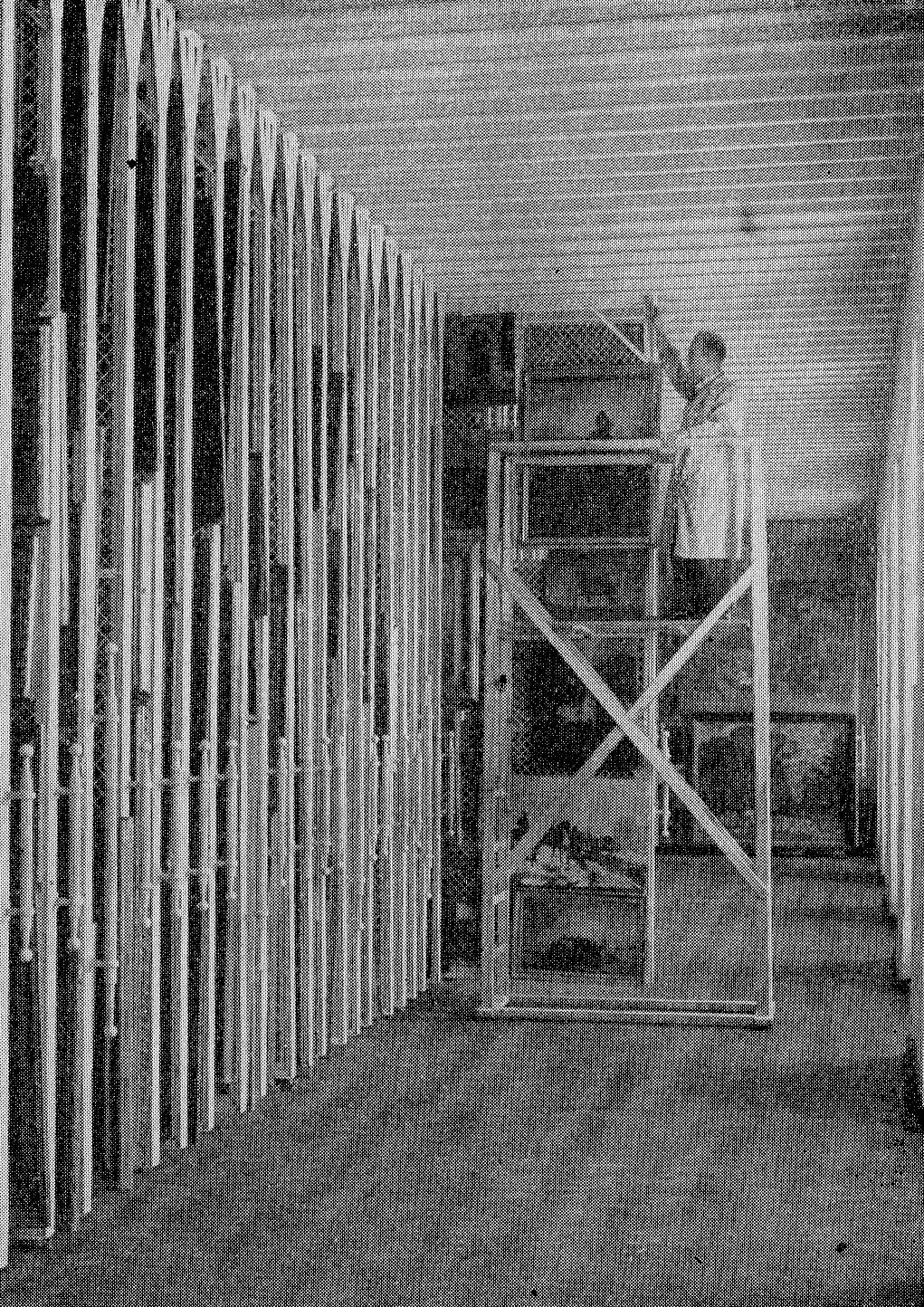
MN Warsaw. Interior painting store. 1966

They type of objects in the collection, available space, and need for ease of accessibility tend to determine what type of storage system is utilized for a particular collection. There are many generic storage systems that can be purchased and modified to fit the needs of a specific collection, and this is generally more cost effective than having a system specially built. In small storage areas many institutions will utilize mobile systems that have shelving units on a track, which allows access to a desired aisle while the rest of the shelving units are pushed together.

Wood storage furniture is typically avoided, even if painted, as it offgasses harmful acids, while often used metal storage equipment is typically made out of steel that is powder-coated with an epoxy finish, which is more durable than an acrylic or polyester finish.

=== Storage racks ===
Sliding racks are typically used for the storage of framed works of art, where works are hung on a wire rack connected to tracks that are suspended from channels on the floor and ceiling, which keeps the racks from swaying. This type of system allows great variation, as the distance between racks can be adjusted to accommodate large or small frames, and works can be organized to make the most of the space while keeping them in their upright position to avoid damage. These types of sliding rack systems can also be a closed unit, where the end of each rack has a panel with a gasket and closed walls at either end, or each individual rack can be a sealed space in itself, which is typically used for textile display or visible storage systems, where the objects are encased in a transparent rack. Mobile racks can also be utilized to hang textiles, where the textiles can either be draped over a bar, or supported by hooks attached to frames. Racks can also be mounted to the walls of storage spaces, utilizing the perimeter space of a storage area, which is safest for framed objects that should not be moved often, such as framed pastel drawings.

=== Shelving and cabinets ===
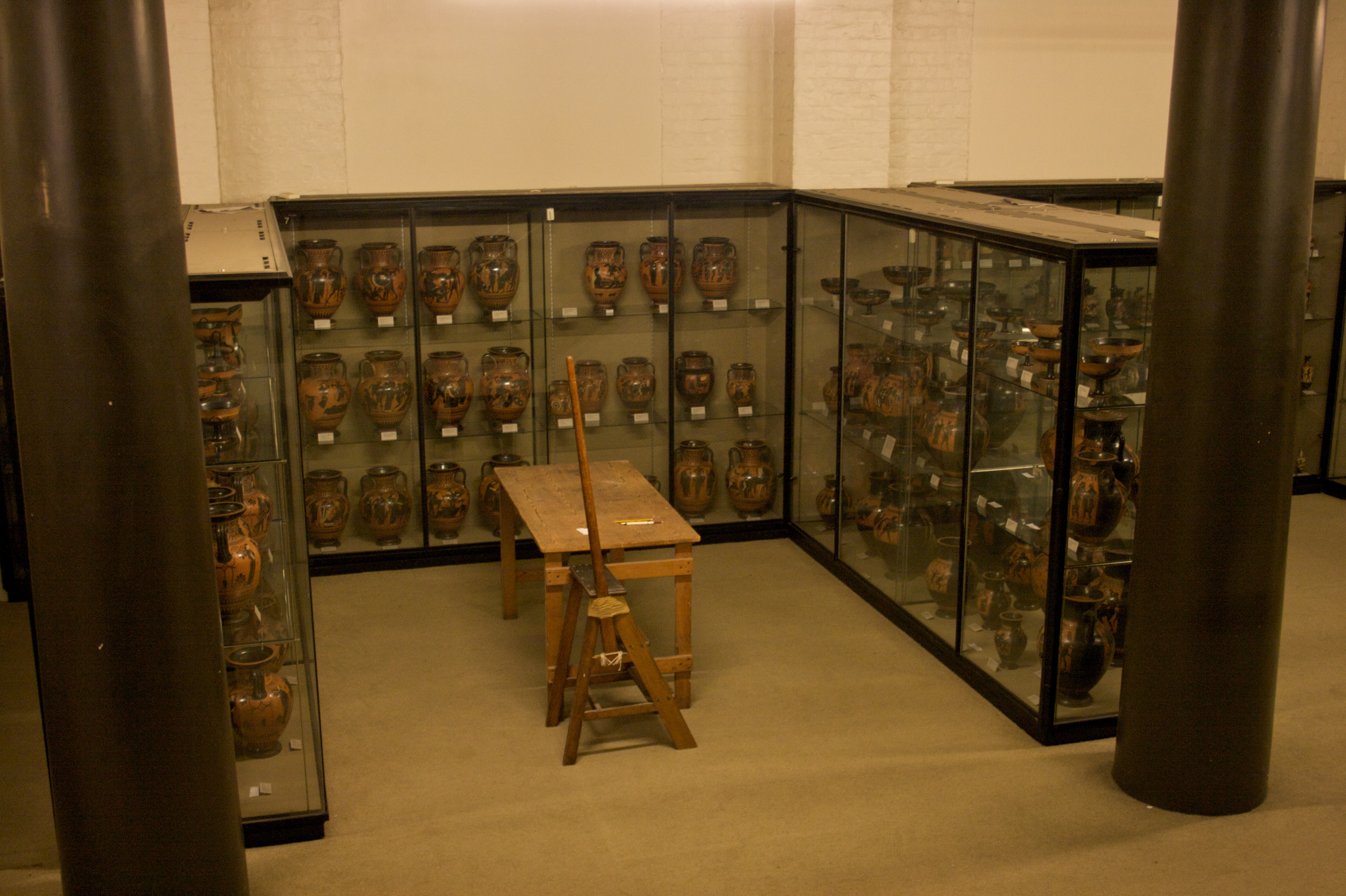
Backstage Pass at the British Museum 10

Open steel shelving systems are cost effective, and easily adjusted to accommodate objects of various sizes. Deeper shelves are often utilized for larger objects, while smaller objects are typically stored on narrower shelves to avoid overcrowding, and potential damage when retrieving objects from the back of the shelf. Shelving units can accommodate the height of the ceiling if necessary, but it is safer for objects and those working with them to keep shelves within an easily accessible reach. If open shelving is used, it is suggested that the objects are placed in boxes, or otherwise covered to protect the objects from dust and other environmental factors. Metal shelving is prone to carry vibrations, so if objects are not individually housed in boxes or otherwise stabilized, it is recommended that the shelves be lined with a protective padding. It is also necessary for cabinets to be stabilized by being bolted to the floor or walls, and for shelves to have restraining bars, to avoid tipping, especially in earthquake prone areas.

Cabinets tend to be versatile and easily accommodate a wide variety of objects with adjustable shelving and drawers, and have the ability to close the objects off to avoid damage from dust and light even if the objects are not in boxes or otherwise covered.

=== Drawers ===
Drawers can be open or closed, and contained within cabinets or stand as a unit of their own. Open drawer systems leave room between drawers and are often adjustable to accommodate objects of different heights by placing the drawers in the desired runners or leaving unused drawers out completely. Closed drawer systems offer more protection from dust and light exposure than the open drawer systems, and the drawers are typically shorter to accommodate small objects, textiles, and two-dimensional objects. Dividers can be made to fit in shallow drawers to create individual compartments for small objects like coins, or small individual boxes can be utilized in the same fashion, which allows the entire box to be removed so the object itself is handled less.

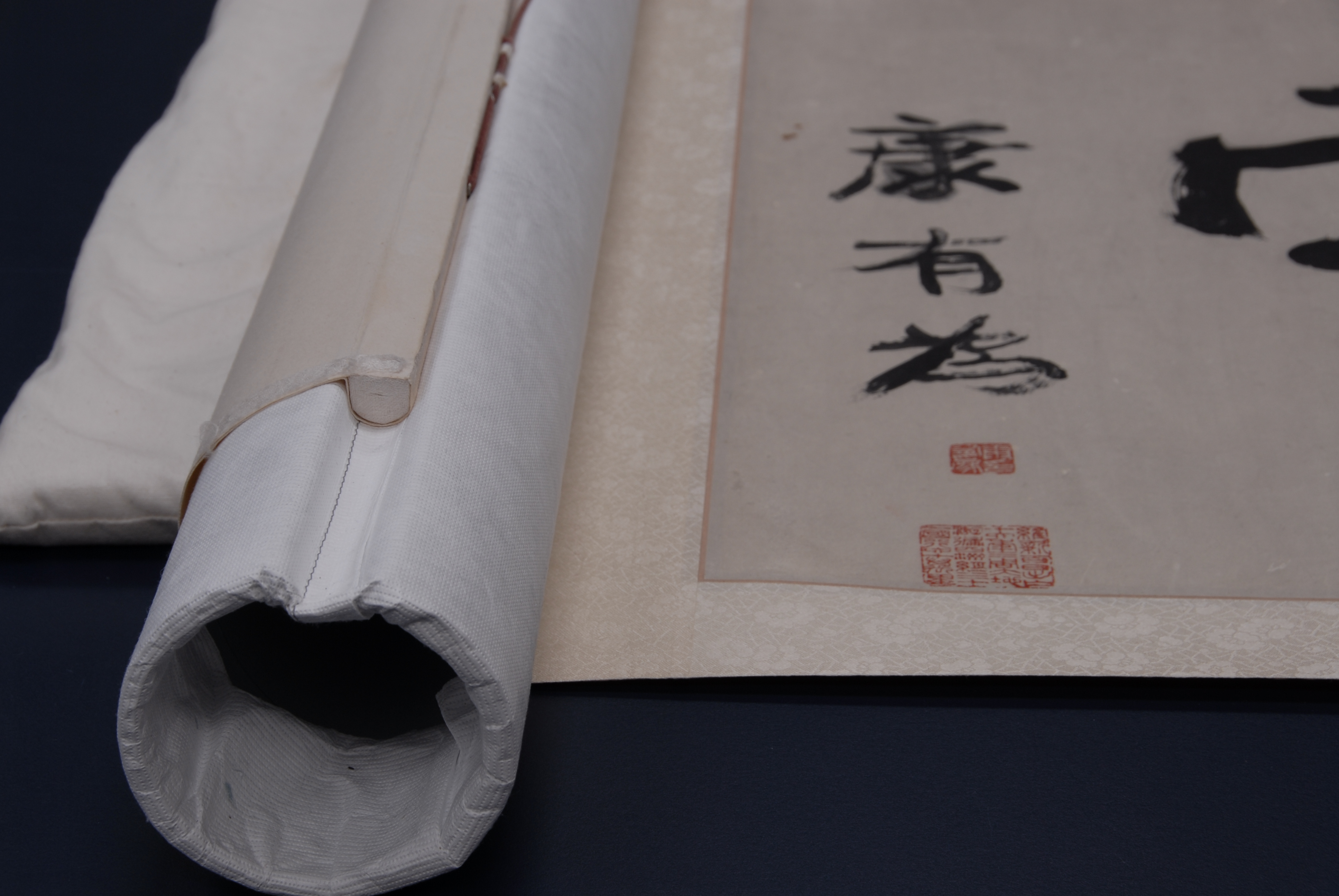
An archival tube role for a Chinese scroll.

=== Textile rolls ===
Rolls are a preferred way to store certain textiles because they help to avoid creasing or stretching. The method typically involves rolling textiles around a cardboard tube that has been covered with acid-free paper, or some other barrier, and then a plastic cover is wrapped around the rolled textile, with the ends loosely tied, to protect from dust. Rolled textiles can be placed on a shelf, but a preferred method is to suspend them horizontally by the ends of the tubes, which keeps the textiles from being damaged by pressure.

== Archival housing materials ==
Archival housing materials are utilized to protect objects from dust, light, and vibrations that could potentially harm objects in the storage space, if they were not otherwise protected. Commonly used office supplies do not typically have archival qualities, and to ensure that collections objects are not affected by these materials, institutions do not use materials that have not been tested, to ensure they are inert and therefore will not place the collections at risk.

=== Archival boxes ===
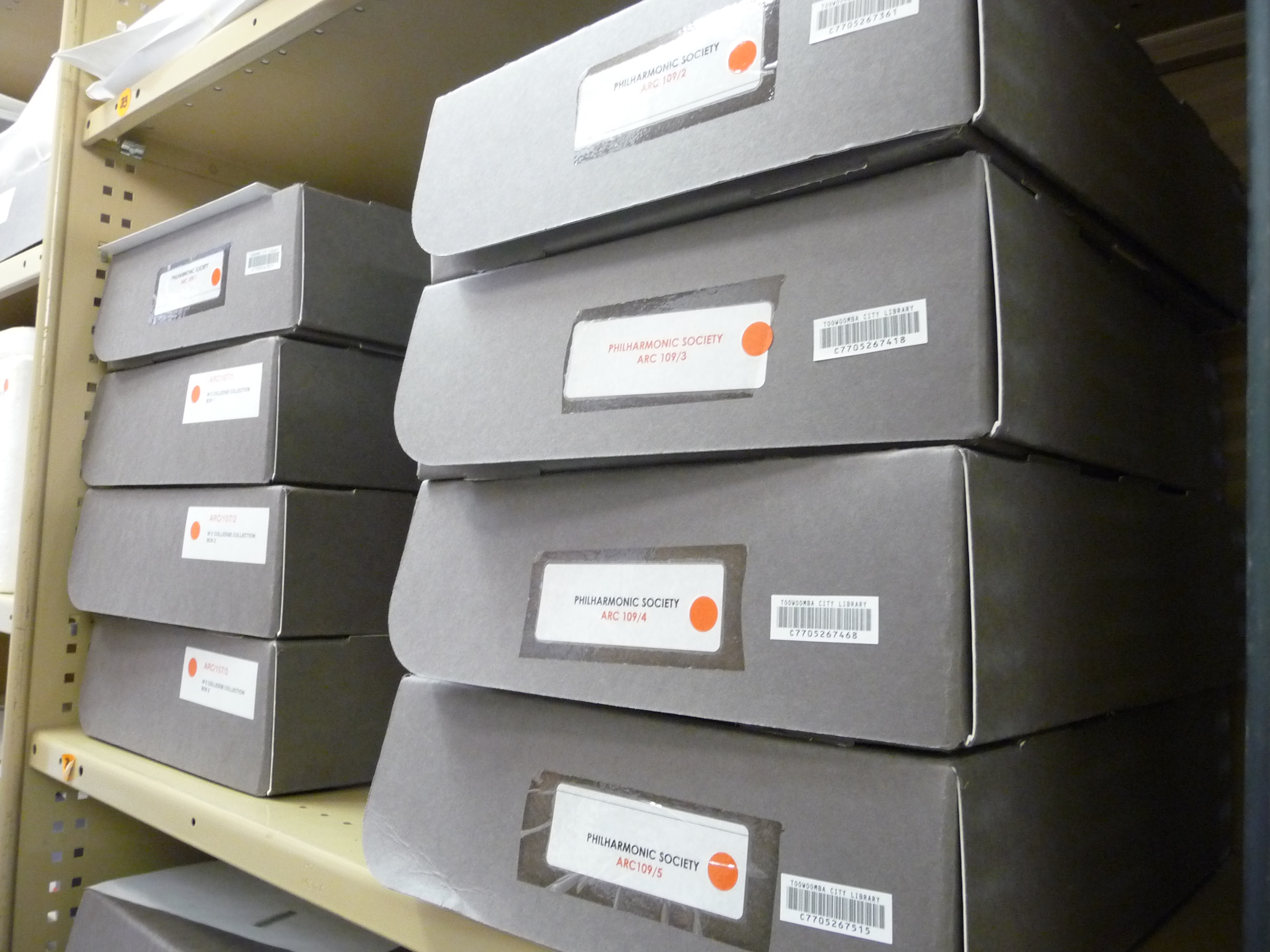
Archival boxes on open shelves.

Boxes can add an additional layer of microclimate insulation and make moving objects easier. Archival boxes are typically made of corrugated, acid-free paper, either buffered or unbuffered, or they can be made of corrugated polyethylene or polypropylene plastic.

=== Archival papers ===
All paper products will acidify over time, so even archival acid-free paper products used for storage are typically replaced every few years. Archival acid-free paper products can be either buffered or unbuffered. Unbuffered paper has a neutral pH and is used for housing photographs, textiles, and most other types of objects, while buffered paper, which is impregnated with calcium carbonate and has an alkaline pH, is used for storing paper objects. The buffered paper absorbs the acid that paper objects emit and keeps the micro-environment from becoming overly acidic for a longer period of time.

- Acid-free glassine paper is typically used to cover friable materials or objects with oily/tacky surfaces, as it is smooth and does not create static electricity, though it is only used for short periods of time because it deteriorates quickly.
- Soft unbuffered acid-free tissue paper is used for covering a variety of objects, creating padding in boxes, and for placing in the folds of textiles to prevent creasing.
- Acid-free folders are valuable for storing unframed prints and documents in flat files.

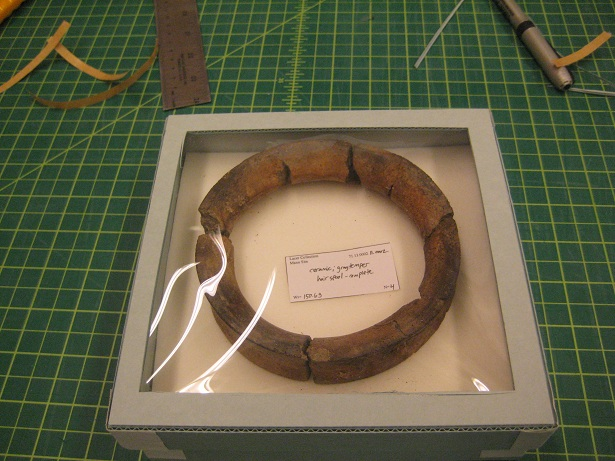
Ceramic ring housed in archival box with Ethafoam pad and plastic covered viewing window.

=== Archival plastics ===
Most common plastics contain chlorinated compounds and plasticizers, which can migrate out and harm objects. Polyethylene and polyester are considered archival plastics because they do not offgas harmful chemicals, but they can produce static electricity in a low RH, so they should be avoided around friable objects.

- Polyester film, or Mylar, is a good tool for paper preservation and can act as a vapor barrier.
- Tyvek is a textile-like material created from high-density polyethylene, and works as an alternative to glassine paper, but its fabric-like quality also allows it to be draped over objects and utilized in numerous ways where paper products are not ideal.
- Polypropylene or polyethylene bags come in a multitude of sizes, with or without zip closures, and are often utilized for small objects, but may trap moisture and cause molding if sealed closed.

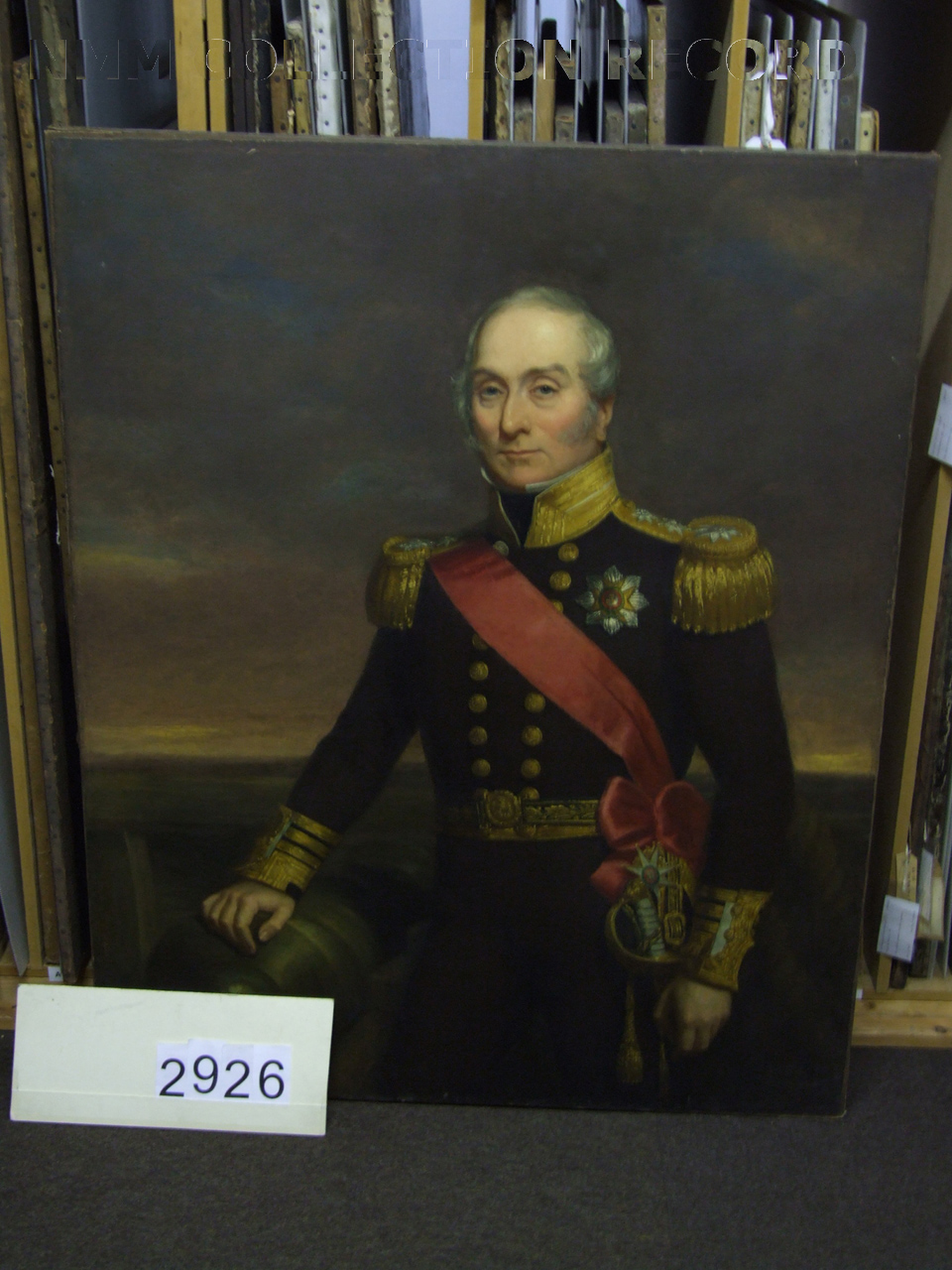
Painting in storage at the Royal Museums Greenwich, tagged with an identification number.

=== Archival fabrics ===
Fabrics are utilized for wrapping or padding objects, or in the form of string to secure wrappings or labels onto objects. Archival fabrics are typically washed before use to remove sizing chemicals and to soften the material, and are never dyed.

- Cotton fabrics are often used, typically in the form of twill tape and threads, which allow for an easy way to secure wrappings, secure objects within containers, and to tie tags to objects with registration information.
- Unbleached muslin is often used to wrap sculptures and textiles.
- Polyester batting is often utilized for padding objects, especially textiles, which often require padding between folds to prevent creasing.

=== Archival foams ===
Foam rubber and urethane foams offgas harmful fumes, and are highly flammable, so they are typically avoided in collection storage spaces.

- Polyethylene microfoam, commonly called Ethafoam, is an inert foam that is useful for lining drawers and shelves, padding or cradling objects, or for mounting objects. It is commercially available in numerous sizes and can easily be cut and shaped to fit the users needs.

== Open Storage ==
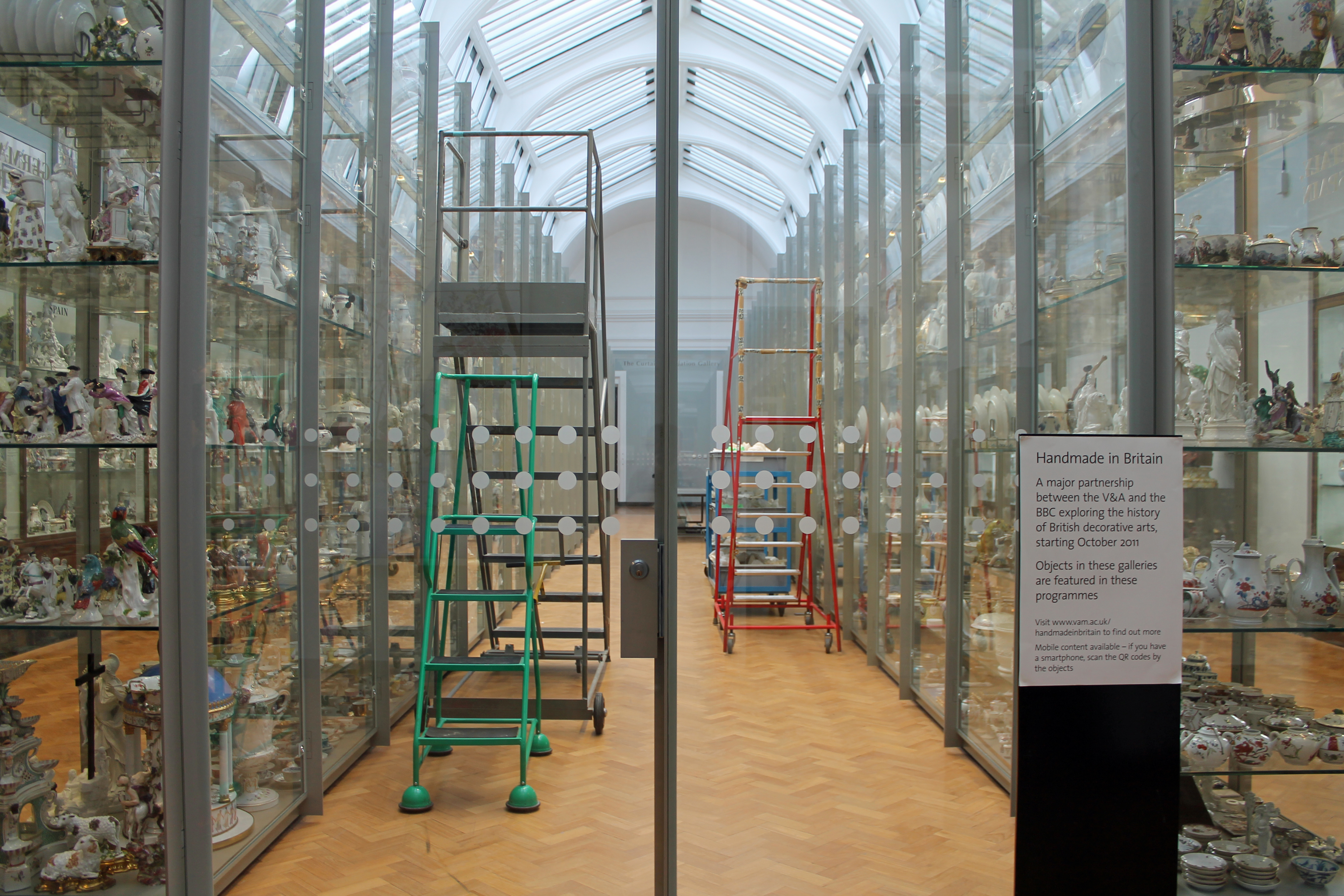
Visual storage at the Victoria & Albert Museum

Many museums are beginning to opt for open storage spaces that allow visitors to see more of the collections and behind the scenes activities. While this practice has become popular for the enjoyment of visitors and the transparency of institutions, the practice allows for increased light exposure, dust levels, and other environmental concerns that could be potentially harmful to the objects.

Museums with open storage:

- The Broad
- The Brooklyn Museum
- The Metropolitan Museum of Art
- Museum of Arts and Sciences (Daytona Beach)
- The Polytechnic Museum
- Victoria and Albert Museum

== See also ==
- Art Handler
- Collection (Museums)
- Collections Care
- Collections Maintenance (Museum)
- Collections Policy
- Museum Integrated Pest Management
