= Treloar Resource Centre =

Coordinates: 35.215°S 149.145°E

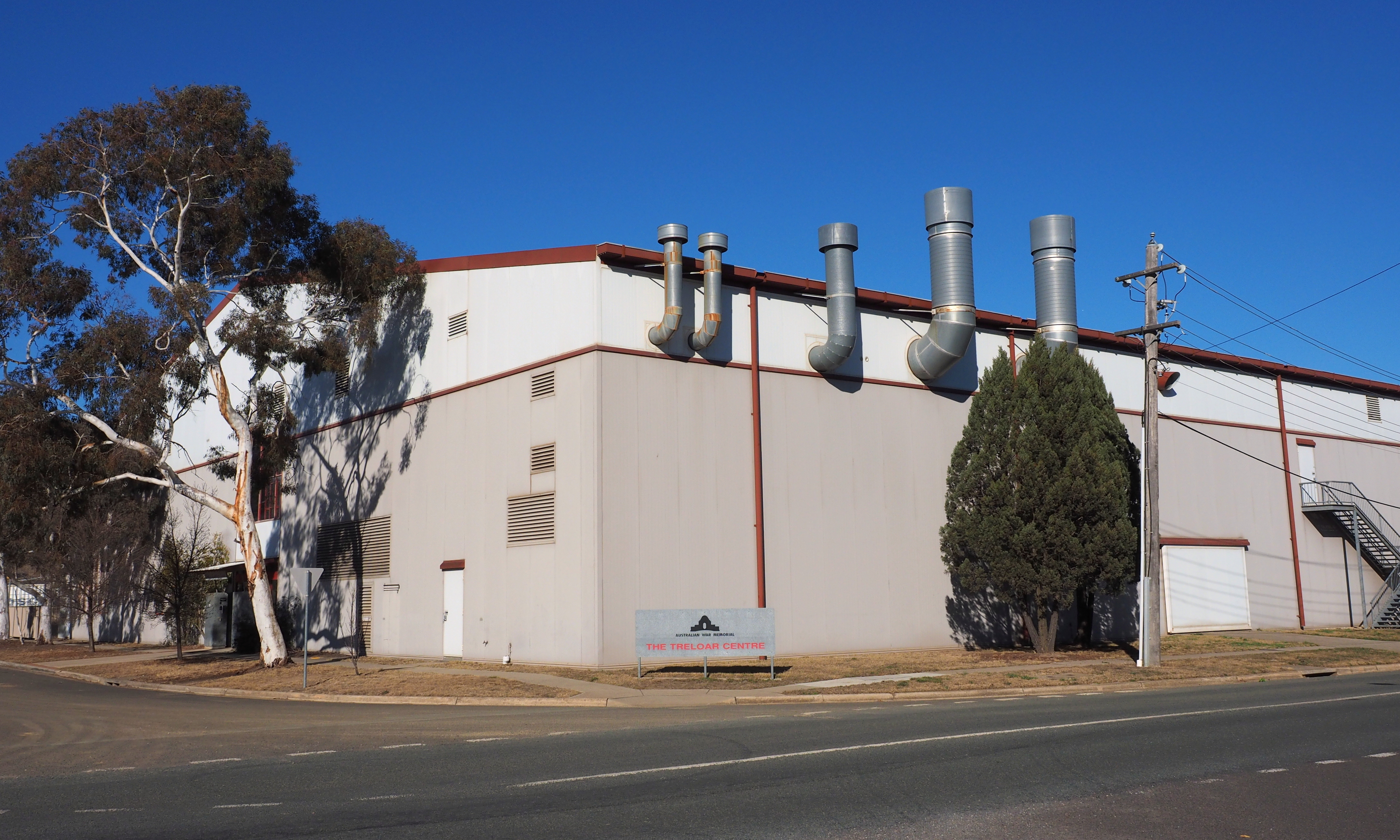
The Treloar C building at the Treloar Resource Centre in 2018

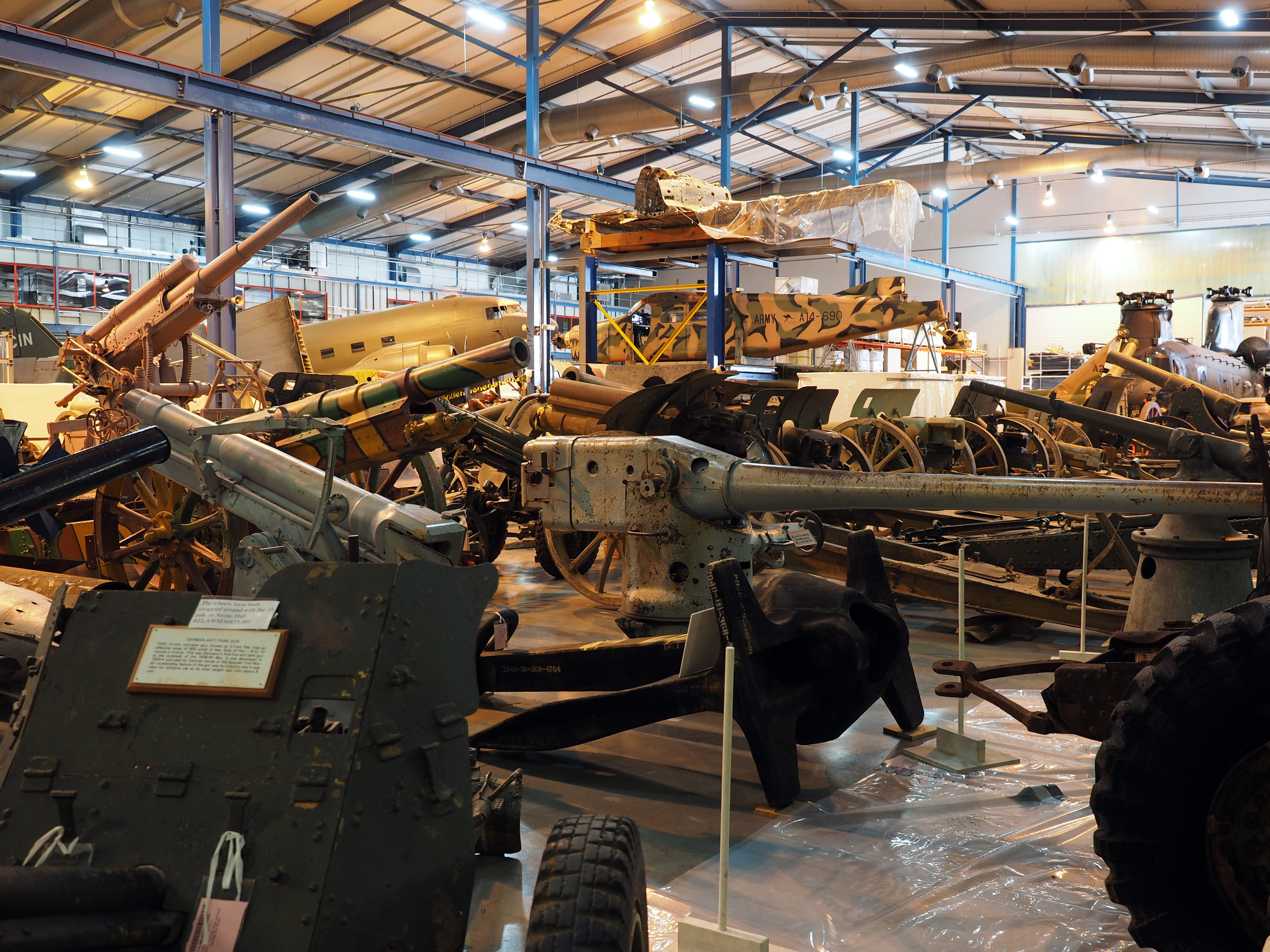
Military aircraft and equipment stored inside the building in 2016

The Treloar Resource Centre, also known as the Treloar Centre and Treloar Technology Centre, is the Australian War Memorial's (AWM's) storage and conservation facility. It is located in the industrial suburb of Mitchell, Australian Capital Territory. The AWM describes the Treloar Resource Centre as "the Memorial's conservation facility and store for large objects of military technology, including aircraft, vehicles, boats, missiles and guns".

== History ==
From the 1950s the AWM used a warehouse in Duntroon, Australian Capital Territory to store items in its collection which were not on display. The first building in the Treloar Centre was built at the cost of $6 million during the early 1990s to replace this facility. It had 5,800 square metres of storage space and was air conditioned so that items could be properly preserved. The building was officially opened on 21 April 1994. The centre is named after John Treloar, the AWM's director for most of the period between 1920 and 1952.

By 2017, the AWM had purchased five parcels of land at Mitchell to accommodate expansions of the Treloar Resource Centre. These included a block of land which was leased to a third party until 2040. At this time, the total storage space available to the AWM was 15,500 square metres.

The AWM's website states that the Treloar Resource Centre contains "one of the world's leading military equipment collections". This includes a large number of World War I artillery guns. An annual "Big Things in Store" open day is conducted at the facility.

In 2017 the AWM received approval to construct an additional building at the Treloar Resource Centre. This facility will provide a further 5,240 square meters of storage space.

== See also ==
- Paul E. Garber Preservation, Restoration, and Storage Facility
- Vimy House
