= Collections maintenance =

Daily care of cultural heritage

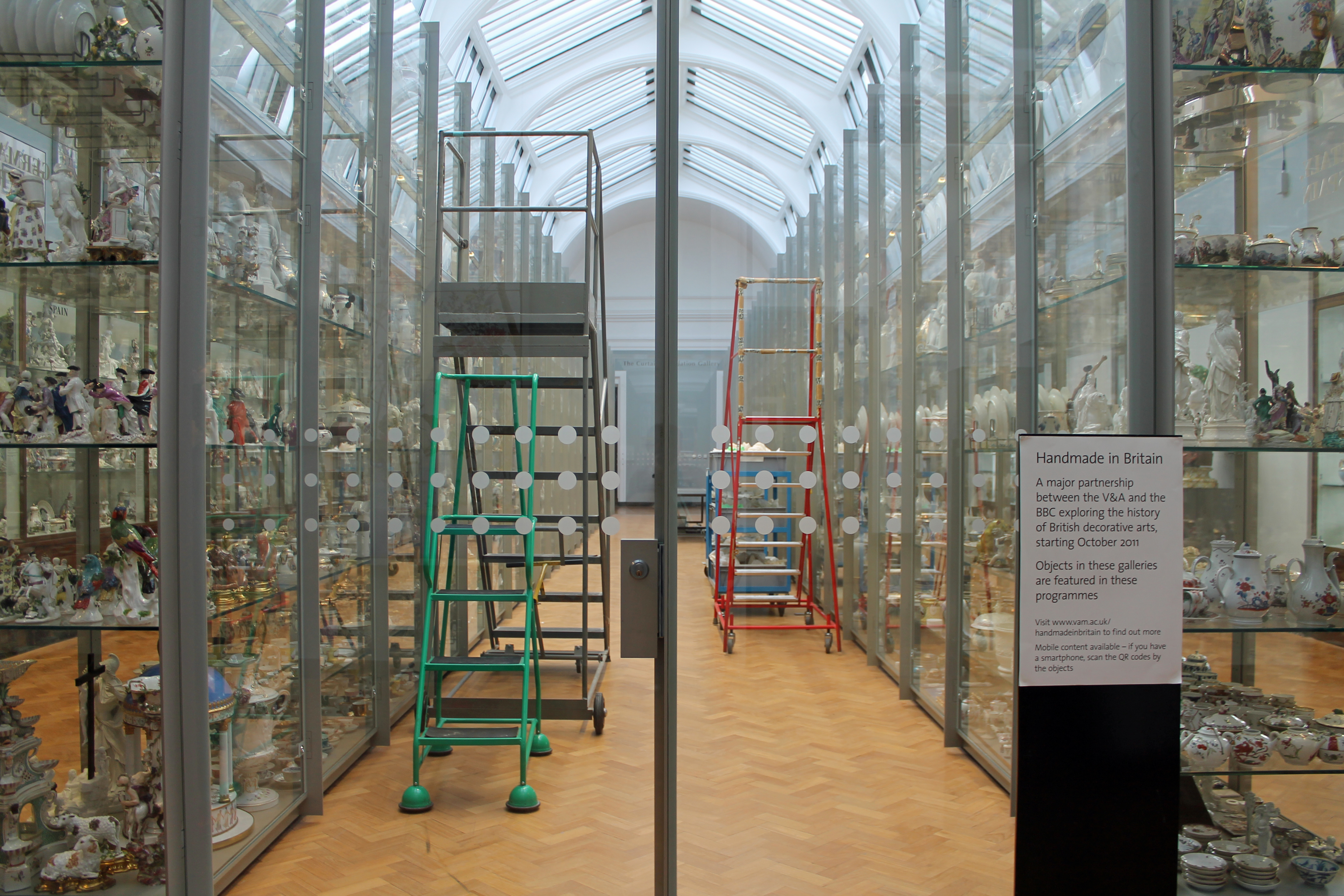
Visual storage at the Victoria & Albert Museum

Collection maintenance is an area of collections management that consists of the day-to-day hands on care of collections and cultural heritage. The primary goal of collections maintenance or preventive conservation is to prevent further decay of cultural heritage by ensuring proper storage and upkeep including performing regular housekeeping of the spaces and objects and monitoring and controlling storage and gallery environments. Collections maintenance is part of the risk management field of collections management. The professionals most involved with collections maintenance include collection managers, registrars, and archivists, depending on the size and scope of the institution. Collections maintenance takes place in two primary areas of the museum: storage areas and display areas.

Collection maintenance and its tasks all work as a means to continually observe the condition of collections and ensure they are properly maintained and cared for. Because museums and repositories are stewards of cultural property in the public trust, they have a "responsibility to provide reasonable care for the objects entrusted" to them. Museum's collections maintenance tasks can also involve assessing and implementing strategies to improve storage areas and containers while continuously monitoring environmental conditions that may affect objects.

The collections management policy of an institution should include sections that address storage, integrated pest management, conservation, record management and documentation, inventories, and risk management. These policy sections should guide the scope of collections maintenance and designate responsibilities with staff members. A Collections Management Policy is considered a core document meant to support Collections Stewardship Core Standards and may be updated periodically to reflect best practices best served for a museum's specific collection.

== Agents of Deterioration ==
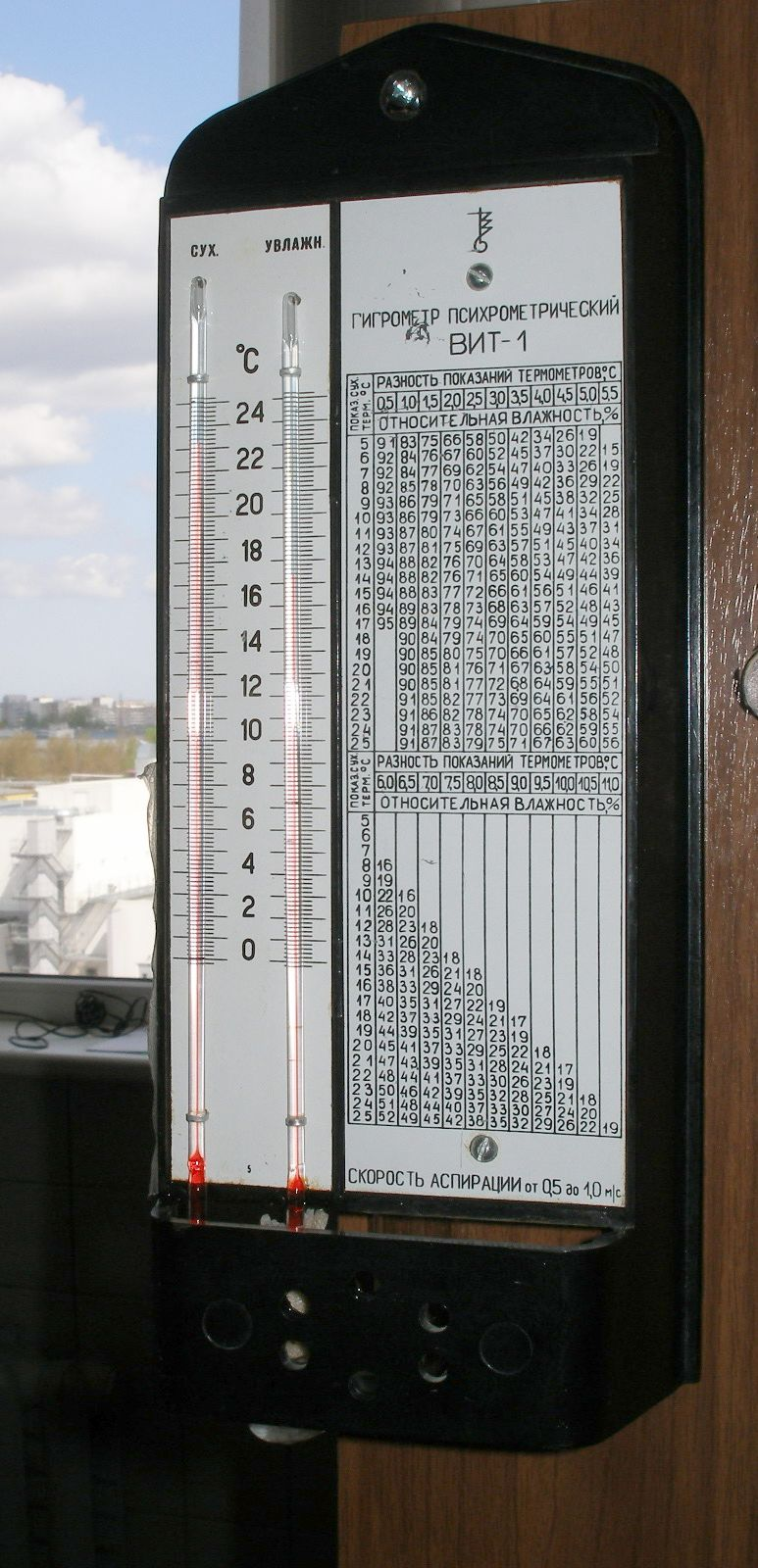
Psychrometers are one instrument of choice to measure the temperature and relative humidity of a space.

Agents of deterioration are forces which act upon materials and cause them to degrade over time. There are ten main agents of deterioration which should be monitored on a regular basis and guarded against as a part of collections maintenance. These are temperature, incorrect relative humidity, light, dust & pollutants, pests, physical force, theft & vandalism, fire, water, and custodial neglect. It is important to recognize the type of damage each agent may present as well as ways to mitigate harmful effects.

Environmental conditions are highly controllable in most indoor situations. They include the temperature, relative humidity, light levels present in a collection space on any given day, and contaminants. Some flexibility is naturally built into most collections when it comes to the temperature and humidity changes they can bear, allowing for conditions to vary somewhat in response to the outdoor environment of a location.

Two types of light offer potential decay to cultural heritage: ultraviolet (UV) light and visual light (light that can be perceived by the human eye). Although they can be affected simultaneously by removing light sources, reducing overall intensity, or increasing the distance between a light source and an object, best preventive practice treats these types of light separately due to their differences.

Contaminants can come in many forms including naturally occurring chemical breakdowns in certain compounds, particulate pollutants, and accidental human contamination. Protecting collections from contaminants can be as simple as creating barriers to prevent abuse or as complicated as taking preventive actions to protect an object from its own chemical breakdown.

=== Temperature ===
Temperature acts primarily in conjunction with relative humidity, but it can trigger damage in its own right. Extreme high temperature can cause structural damage to some materials; paint may become brittle in excessive heat and some plastics may soften or melt in the heat. "High temperatures also accelerate chemical and biological processes," which can lead to corrosion or embrittlement of material. Insects also thrive in warm environments, and so temperatures should be kept as "cool … as practicable in storage and display areas".

Any storage or display situation must take into consideration the temperature at which collection permanence can be optimized, and systems should be in place that aim to meet that standard, ideally in conjunction with efficient use of energy and funds. Different materials react to temperature in different ways. For example, ceramics are vulnerable to direct heat on a mechanical level, but many organic materials are at greater risk of undergoing phase transition if the temperature becomes excessively cold. One rule of thumb applies across the board: the rate of chemical reactions is dependent upon temperature in such a way that higher temperatures reduce the activation energy and hasten chemical degradation processes.

Human comfort levels must also be considered. Storage areas can often get away with slightly lower temperatures than display areas since they are not accessed as often, and it is most likely that those who do enter the space will be prepared for the conditions. In galleries, however, viewers must feel comfortable enough with the temperature to spend time there, otherwise the collection will simply not be viewed and lose its purpose in being on display.

=== Incorrect relative humidity ===
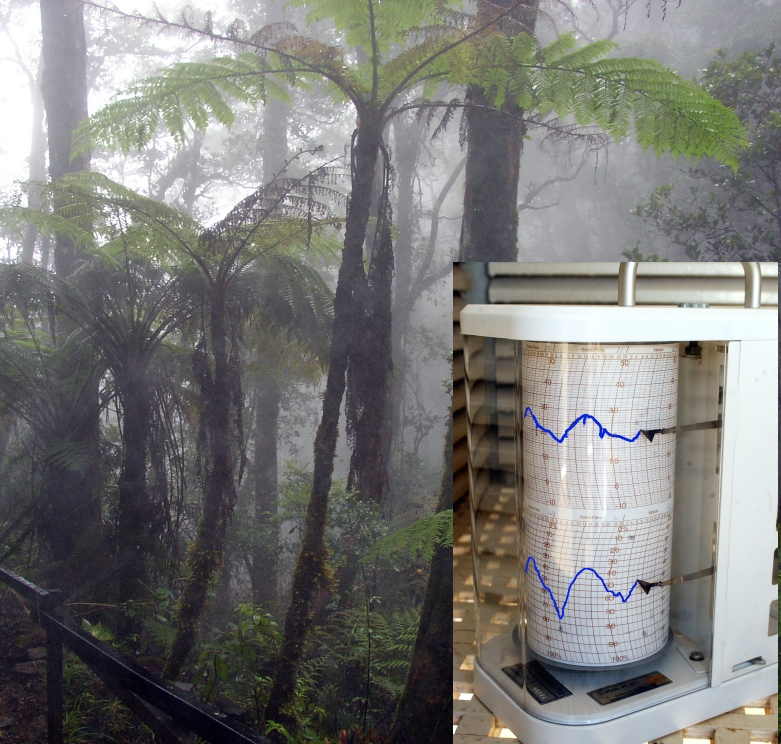
A cloud forest and a hygrometer

Moisture has strong effects on nearly all cultural heritage materials, with ceramics and glass being exceptions to these effects in most cases. Metals face the risk of corrosion as RH increases, a risk which is enhanced by surface contaminants and emphasizes the need for proper housing. Additionally, mold growth is far more likely as humidity increases, which not only could cause allergic reactions for viewers but it also weakens the collections afflicted and attracts other pests. In contrast to this requisite for dry conditions, if the atmosphere is not humid enough wooden objects could crack or warp, and many organic materials face embrittlement below 40% RH.

Relative humidity (RH) is the amount of water held in the air as a percentage of how much could be held in fully saturated air at a given temperature. The possible amount of moisture held at a given time is directly related to temperature. Warm air can hold more water than cold air.

It is important to measure the RH of spaces regularly by using a number of tools including humidity indicator cards, thermo-hygrographs, hygrometers, psychrometers and data loggers. Once these data are being monitored, there are several ways to adjust relative humidity by using humidifiers, dehumidifiers, improving heating and air conditioning systems, and adjusting the temperature of the space.

In recent decades, it has become understood that even delicate organic materials have some elasticity in their response to relative humidity (RH) fluctuations, allowing the materials to swell or contract as necessary. This phenomenon is naturally reversible within a range of 50% ± 15% RH. Destructive chemical and mechanical processes, such as hydrolysis at high RH and embrittlement and cross-linking at low RH, can be held to a minimum within a similar range for a general museum collection.

Although minor and gentle fluctuations in RH can reasonably be withstood by most collections, quick or drastic shifts can be harmful. Anisotropic materials such as wood and ivory are especially responsive to humidity changes, and RH issues are compounded when they are attached to inorganic materials such as a metal. The metal acts as a restraint, hindering the organic materials' ability to expand and contract as needed. Thus, cultural heritage objects composed of highly responsive materials or a combination of organic and inorganic materials should ideally be in carefully controlled climates and buffered against the atmosphere by their display or storage housing.

Damage due to incorrect relative humidity occurs in conditions where high percentages (wet) and low percentages (dry) are present. High relative humidity can result in mold growth, salt efflorescence, rapid corrosion, and swelling of wood. Low relative humidity can result in cracking of wooden objects and embrittlement of paper and organic textiles. Rapid fluctuations in relative humidity can also be damaging, as "Rapidly fluctuating temperature and relative humidity compound all of these effects." Institutions should aim to keep the RH constant in exhibitions and storage areas because many organic objects expand and contract as both temperature and RH change.

Some changes undergone by objects are reversible by adjusting the RH, but damage like cracks may be irreversible. Keeping the RH within an appropriate range for the type of material and as consistent as possible will prevent most RH based damage. Limiting storage and display spaces to between 40-60% RH will avoid most damaging effects, but maintaining a stable RH is considered more important than adhering to absolute ranges.

=== Light ===
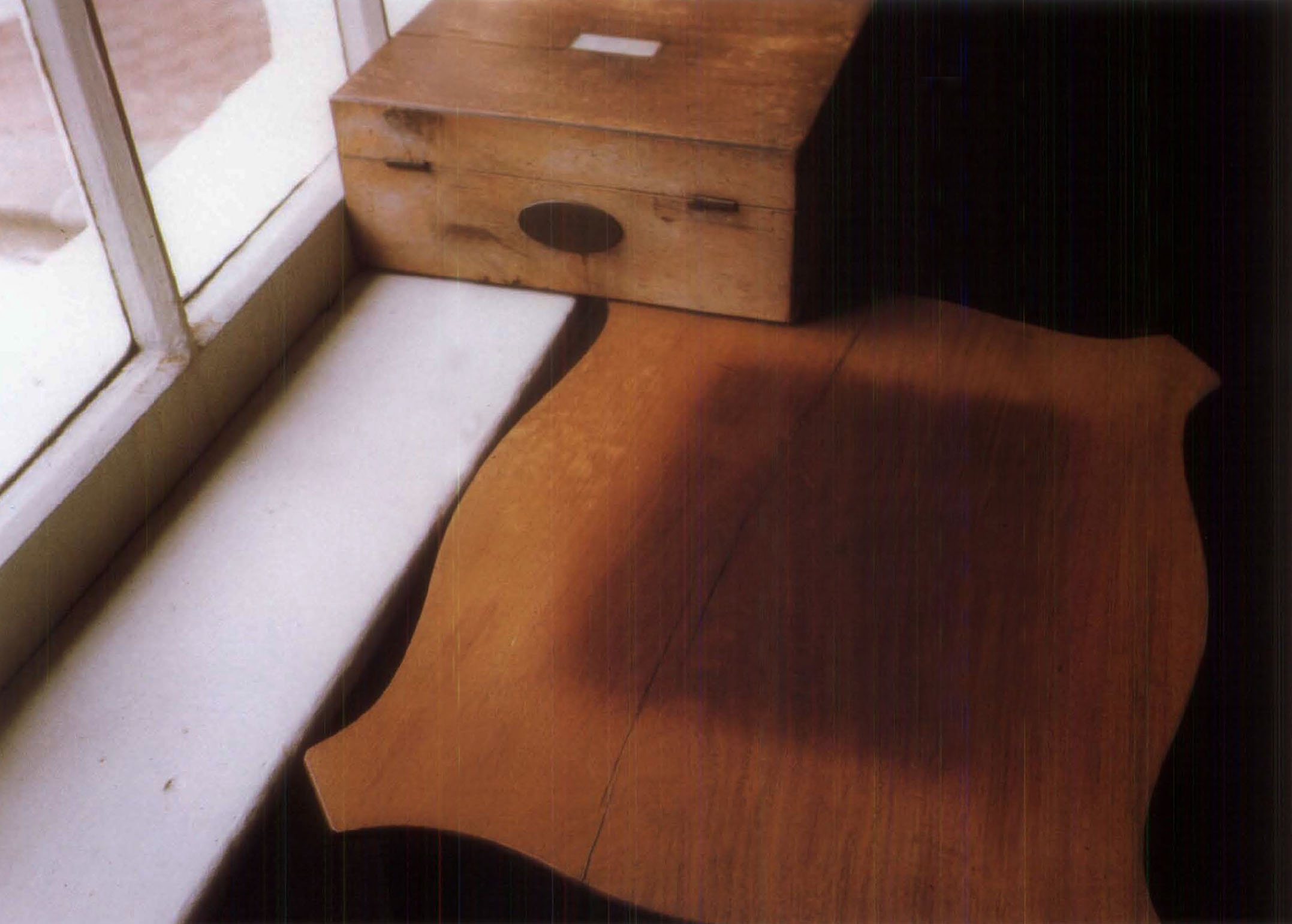
Light has faded the finish of the table top except in the center, where the box rested and shielded the finish

Light, as it relates to collections maintenance, is primarily concerned with the visual and ultraviolet light (UV) ranges of the electromagnetic spectrum. Both types of light can cause damage as "light radiation falling on a surface provides energy to induce chemical changes in the molecules of the material." Damage from light, including loss of color and strength, is cumulative and irreversible. It is therefore crucial that light levels are monitored.

==== Visible light ====
Visual light, measured in lux or foot-candles (fc), cannot be eliminated, as it is required both to view collections in detail and to move safely in the presence of collections. Unfortunately, this means that harmful oxidation effects which visual light makes possible also cannot be eliminated, but merely reduced to the amount necessary for the task at hand.

The effects of visual light began to be studied by artists and color manufacturers as early as the 18th century, but it was not until the mid-20th century that the chemical damage caused by different lighting situations was researched in depth. In recent decades the cumulative nature of light degradation has become better understood by conservation science. Comprehensive studies began to emphasize long-term effects and allow for short-term variation in light levels depending on the specific situation: standard viewing, viewing by the aged, complex study or treatment, and observation of low contrast details all may have different requirements. Practical compromise between protection of cultural heritage and allowing the artifacts to fulfill their visual purpose means there is an allowance of some physical risk.

Even with this flexibility, light interaction should be limited to moments when an object is on view or undergoing study, and the level of lighting should be chosen accordingly. According to Museum Registration Methods, 5th edition, the suggested light levels for certain types of objects is as follows:

"The traditional recommended light level for sensitive materials—including textiles, botanical and zoological specimens, pigmented objects, works on paper, and organic materials such as feathers, furs, and skins—is no more than 50 lux or 5 fc. Moderately sensitive materials, such as oils and acrylics on board and composite inorganic objects, should be exposed to light levels of not more than 150 lux or 15 fc. The traditional levels recommended for the least light-sensitive materials, such as stone, ceramics, metals, and glass, are not more than 300 lux or 30fc."

Because lighting effects are cumulative, any limit in exposure – whether in time or in intensity – prevents material degradation. A period of intense or lengthy light exposure should be balanced out with periods of low exposure.

Preventing light damage is difficult because light is necessary for visitors as well as people who are working with the objects. Exposure can be diminished by ensuring lights are only on when people are present, either by vigilant staff members turning on and off lights, timer switches or with motion sensors. Natural light from windows should be reduced or eliminated in all spaces by covering them with curtains, shades or UV absorbing filters. Where lights are on frequently, such as in galleries and office areas, a light meter should be used at least once a year to determine how much light objects are being exposed to, and adjustments should be made accordingly. In order to reduce the amount of light to which objects are exposed, several steps can be taken. Limiting the amount of time sensitive objects are put on display will help increase their lifespan. Schedules for displaying and resting objects should be developed in consultation with a professional conservator. Light levels for light sensitive objects such as textiles, works on paper, and dyed leather should be kept at 50 lux or less, and at a maximum of 200 lux for more light resistant materials, such as oil paintings, bone, and natural leather. Some material types, such as stone, metal, and glass, are not negatively impacted by light levels, but "it is rarely necessary to exceed 300 lux."

==== Ultraviolet ====
UV is a form of electromagnetic radiation with higher energy than visible light. It does not contribute to the accurate viewing of collections and is ideally completely eliminated; otherwise materials may be weakened in any number of ways ranging from yellowing to disintegration. Organic materials, especially textiles and paper, are particularly vulnerable to UV-caused decay. Direct sunlight holds the most potential for UV damage, but certain types of artificial light bulbs may also produce these harmful rays.

Various types of filters have been developed to combat UV interaction with artifacts on display, and many of them can be used in conjunction with each other to reach the optimal setting for a particular collection. Among the first employed were heavy drapes; a simple solution to apply only if an institution can provide employees to open and close the drapes at the appropriate times based on viewer access. Many filtration devices rely on materials that absorb the UV, such as acrylic films or painted wash walls, but in doing this the materials themselves decay and the filters must be replaced. A better solution is interference filters, which can be customized for the setting of intended use to reflect light at such an angle that it cancels out harmful incoming wavelengths. If an interference filter is selected as the appropriate form of filtration, UV is eliminated completely and efficiently.

=== Contamination with pollutants and dust ===
Contaminants in a collection can pose a threat not only to the objects within the collection, but also to those individuals that come in contact with them. It is therefore necessary to ensure that all objects brought into a collection are carefully documented and researched to prevent accidental contaminations, and to create storage conditions, such as those mentioned above, to mitigate the potential for future contaminate development. Potential contaminants can take the form of gases, liquids, or solids and may therefore pollute objects, and the individuals caring for them, through airborne delivery or physical contact. Collections affected by contaminants will show signs of disintegration, discoloration, or corrosion, with porous materials being the most susceptible.

==== Gaseous pollutants ====
Pollutants in the storage environment atmosphere can also cause damage to material surfaces. In particular silver objects are vulnerable to sulphurous gasses which cause them to tarnish, and lead and pewter objects will corrode when exposed to volatile organic acids. Vulnerable silver objects should be stored in enclosures either with activated charcoal or in silvercloth, "which acts as sulphur scavengers." Silver objects can also be coated, or lacquered, with a clear barrier material such as Agateen No. 27 (cellulose nitrate) or Paraloid B-72 to prevent tarnishing, but these coatings require periodic reapplication. In order to avoid the presence of volatile organic acids, vulnerable objects should not be stored on wooden shelves or in wooden boxes.

Sulfur dioxide (SO_{2}), nitrogen dioxide (NO_{2}), and ozone (O_{3}) are some of the most common types of gaseous pollutants found within collections and can result in the catalyzation of deleterious chemical reactions. The chemical reactions caused by these gases can result in the breakdown of inorganic and organic materials, or the tarnishing of metal objects. Other objects contain intrinsic elements that may begin to break down over time causing a damaging condition known as off-gassing. The storage of construction materials and basic housekeeping within a collection area may also be a source of gaseous pollutants. The hazardous fumes given off by strong cleaning products such as bleach or ammonia can transfer to objects causing deterioration, and construction materials such as adhesives, paints, and sealants may off-gas resulting in additional damages. Storage and display cases should be carefully evaluated for off-gassing risks, and following storage procedures such as those outlined above will all reduce the risk of contaminant damage to objects.

Other sources of volatile organic compounds include collection objects themselves, such as plastics with short lifespans. Cellulose nitrate, cellulose acetate, and poly(vinyl chloride) are known to off-gas pollutants over time, and should be stored separately from other collections to decrease the risk of exposure. Adsorbents such as zeolites, silica or activated charcoal can be used in storage environments to decrease the concentration of acidic gases, but require continued maintenance. Tea leaves have been investigated as alternative sustainable adsorbents for cellulose acetate film collections.

==== Liquid pollutants ====
Human interaction with objects poses a threat of accidental contamination. Moisture and oils from human skin can cause staining of organic materials and corrosion of metals. This risk can be mitigated through implemented handling protocols such as washing hands and wearing protective gloves to minimize direct contact. Objects may also be enclosed in protective casing to further reduce direct handling when possible. Proper storage techniques, such as the use of neutral tissue or untreated cotton packed in polyethylene sheeting or acid-free corrugated cardboard, may be used to individually wrap pieces to prevent accidental contamination of objects between handling and display.

==== Solid pollutants ====
Particulate contaminants, including pollen, dust, fibers, and soot, may affix to objects after entering collection areas through poorly maintained ventilation systems. Individuals passing through a collection area may also have particulates embedded on their clothing or bodies, which can become dislodged thereby becoming an airborne contaminant. Construction or maintenance efforts are another common cause of particulate pollution. Particulates which adhere to collection objects may cause soiling or blemishing, requiring mechanical removal and conservation efforts. These pollutants can be minimized via high quality HVAC systems, regularly replaced filters for vents, and careful placement of objects away from high-risk areas such as designated smoking sections, construction sites, and high-traffic areas such as entryways.

Dust can contain a number of materials including skin, mold and inorganic fragments like silica or sulfur. It is important to keep collections free of dust whenever possible because it can become bound to a surface over time, making it significantly more difficult to remove. Dust is hygroscopic, meaning it is able to attract and hold water molecules creating an ideal climate for mold spores to grow and cause biological damage. Dust's hygroscopic nature can also prompt chemical reactions on a surface, especially upon metals. Inorganic dust particles may have tough sharp edges which can tear fibers and abrade softer surfaces if not properly removed.

The best way to prevent damage from dust is to control and prevent substantial buildup of dust in the first place. This can be done by using air filters in heating and air conditioning systems as well as using vacuum cleaners equipped with HEPA filters when possible. Care should be taken when wiping a clean cloth over a surface dusty with these inorganic particles because it may result in irreversible abrasions and vacuums should be used if soft surfaces are being cleaned. Limiting the amount of exposed surface areas of collections can also prevent dust from settling on objects. This can be done by storing objects in acid-free boxes, object specific enclosures, in drawers or covering open shelves with a polyethylene sheet.

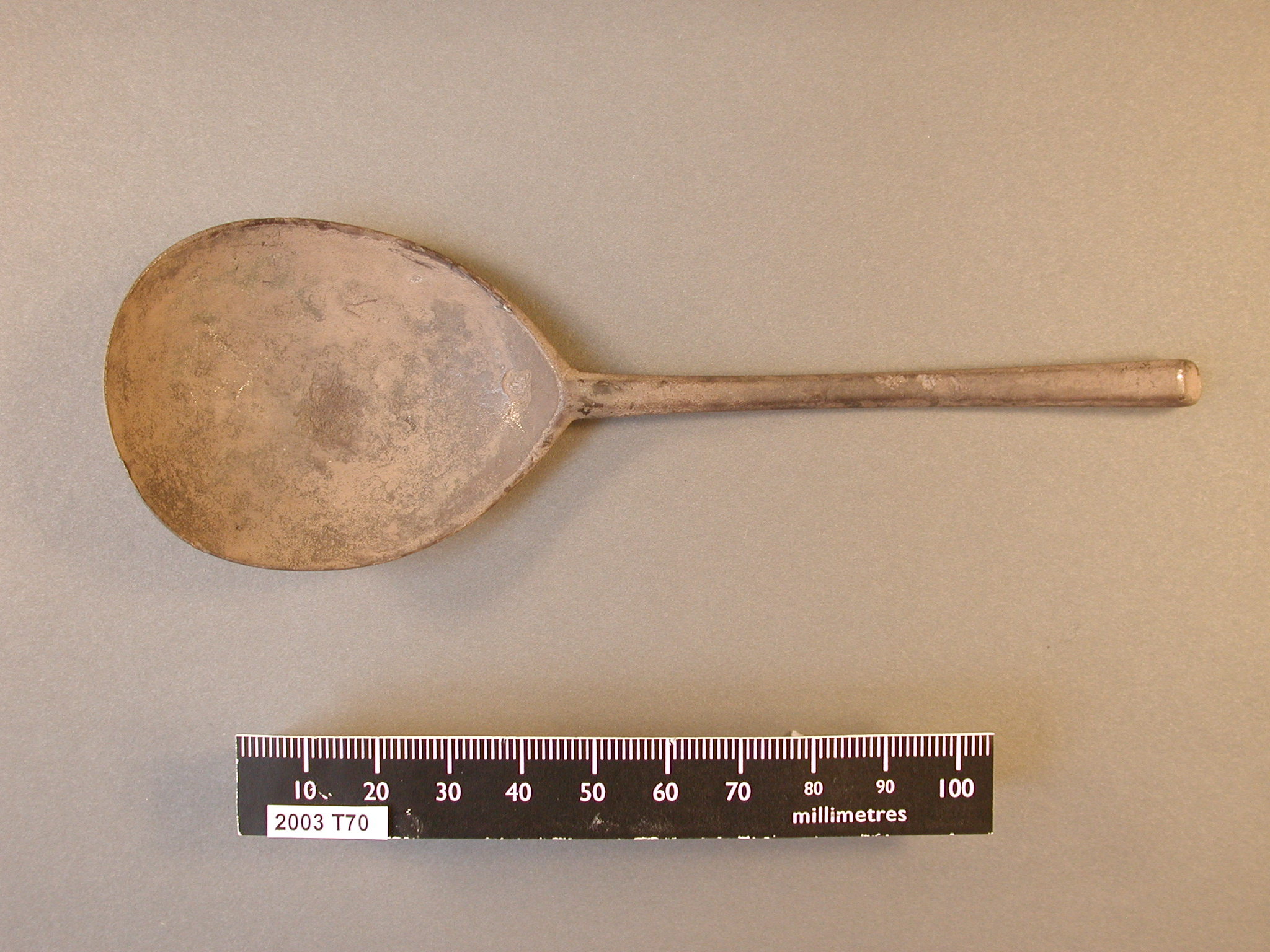
Silver spoon, blackened with tarnish, of slip top form as current in the early -mid 17thCentury.

=== Pests ===
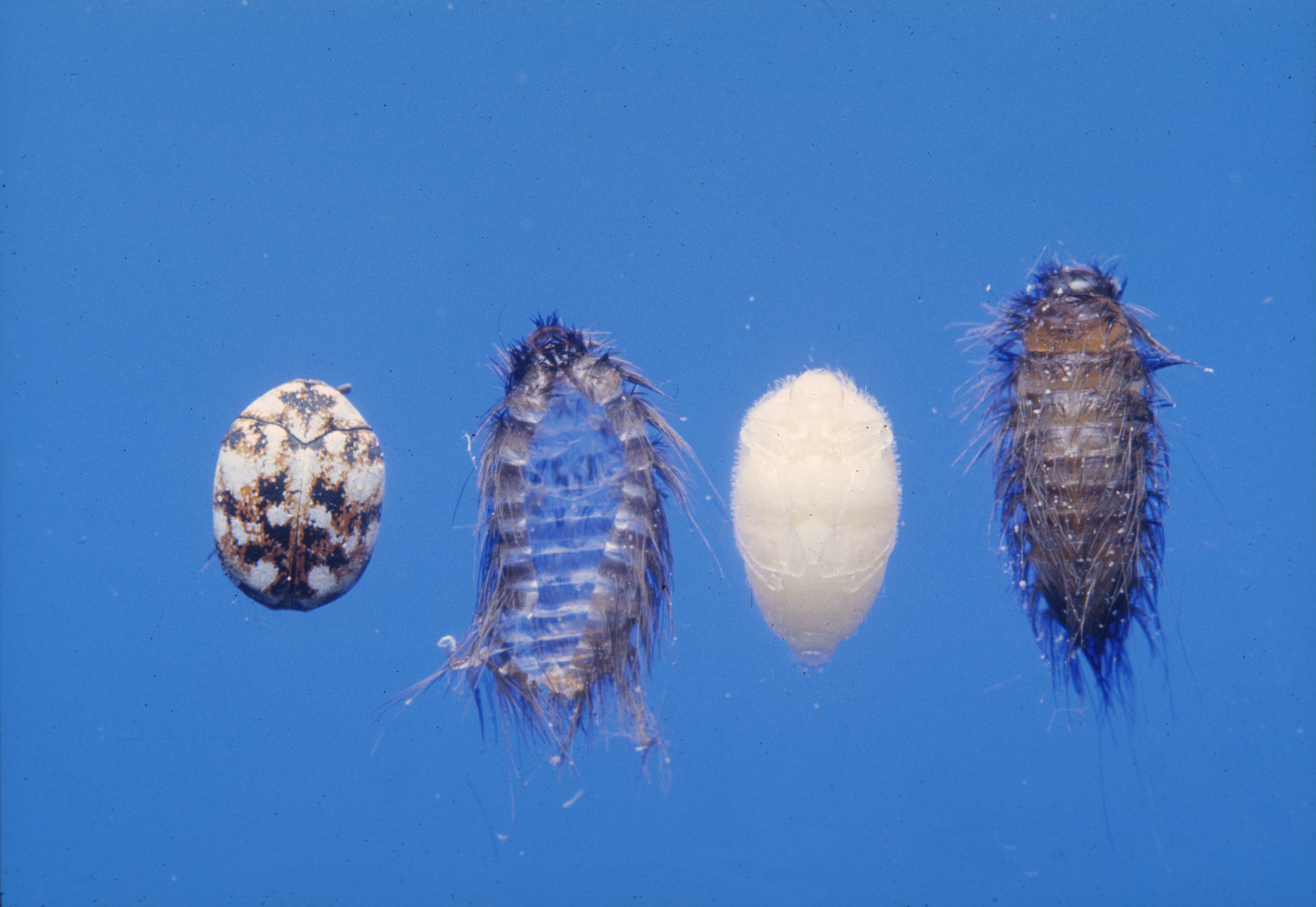
Life cycle of a carpet beetle.

Damage from insects and other museum pests typically occurs because these pests are drawn to collections objects which they view as a food source. Certain material types, such as wood, organic textiles, furs, and paper are more vulnerable to insect damage than others. Collections maintenance works to prevent infestations through a monitoring regime known as integrated pest management or IPM, and often involves a system of glue traps scattered throughout storage and display areas. This allows museum or repository staff to identify vulnerable locations, catch new infestations and identify the type of insect being trapped, and then act to eliminate the infestation.

A range of possible treatments are available to address insect infestation. While in the past, application of chemical treatments was the preferred method, the risks they carry to human life and to the collection mean that they are rarely, if ever, used today. Instead, non-chemical methods are preferred, and include freezing, controlled heating, radiation, and anoxic treatments. Even options as simple as regulating the temperature and relative humidity of a space can be effective at curtailing an infestation, depending on the pest. Each option has benefits and drawbacks, and the choice of treatment used should be undertaken in consultation with a qualified professional.

=== Physical forces ===
Physical force, as an agent of deterioration, refers to any physical action upon an object that would result in damage. Examples range from large-scale events, such as earthquakes and building collapse, down to less readily recognizable issues, such as poor support or constant vibrations.

In order to prevent accidental damage due to physical forces when moving and handling museum objects, objects should be carefully inspected before being picked up, paths should be kept free of obstacles or tripping hazards at all times, rolling carts lined with polyethylene foam padding should be used for moving objects, and "all steps of a procedure must be determined in advance". In storage, objects should be housed where they are easily accessible, and fragile objects should be well supported and stored in padded boxes or mounts. To prevent crushing, heavy boxes or other materials should not be placed on top of other boxes containing collections.

=== Fire ===
Collections maintenance works to prevent and minimize all risks of fire to the collection, including banning smoking, routine maintenance of fire extinguishers, and establishing and maintaining a system for the maintenance of smoke detectors (including a regular schedule of inspection, cleaning, and testing). Protection against fire is best handled in blocking or preventing threats, and secondarily to mitigate the effects of these types of threats. Collections maintenance also protects objects from fire damage with sprinkler systems, fire-proof or fire-resistant storage systems, and limiting other risks of fire throughout the facilities that could stem from electrical systems, combustible materials, and open flames.

=== Water ===
Collections maintenance protects objects against all risks of water damage, and minimizes these risks throughout the facilities (both in storage and display areas for objects). Collections managers find and minimize sources of leaks, move objects away from leak sources and from direct contact with the floor, and install and maintain water alarms. Risks related to water that collections maintenance must also be cautious of include locations that experience extreme weather conditions, faulty pipe or sprinkler systems, and the improper use of water during cleaning.

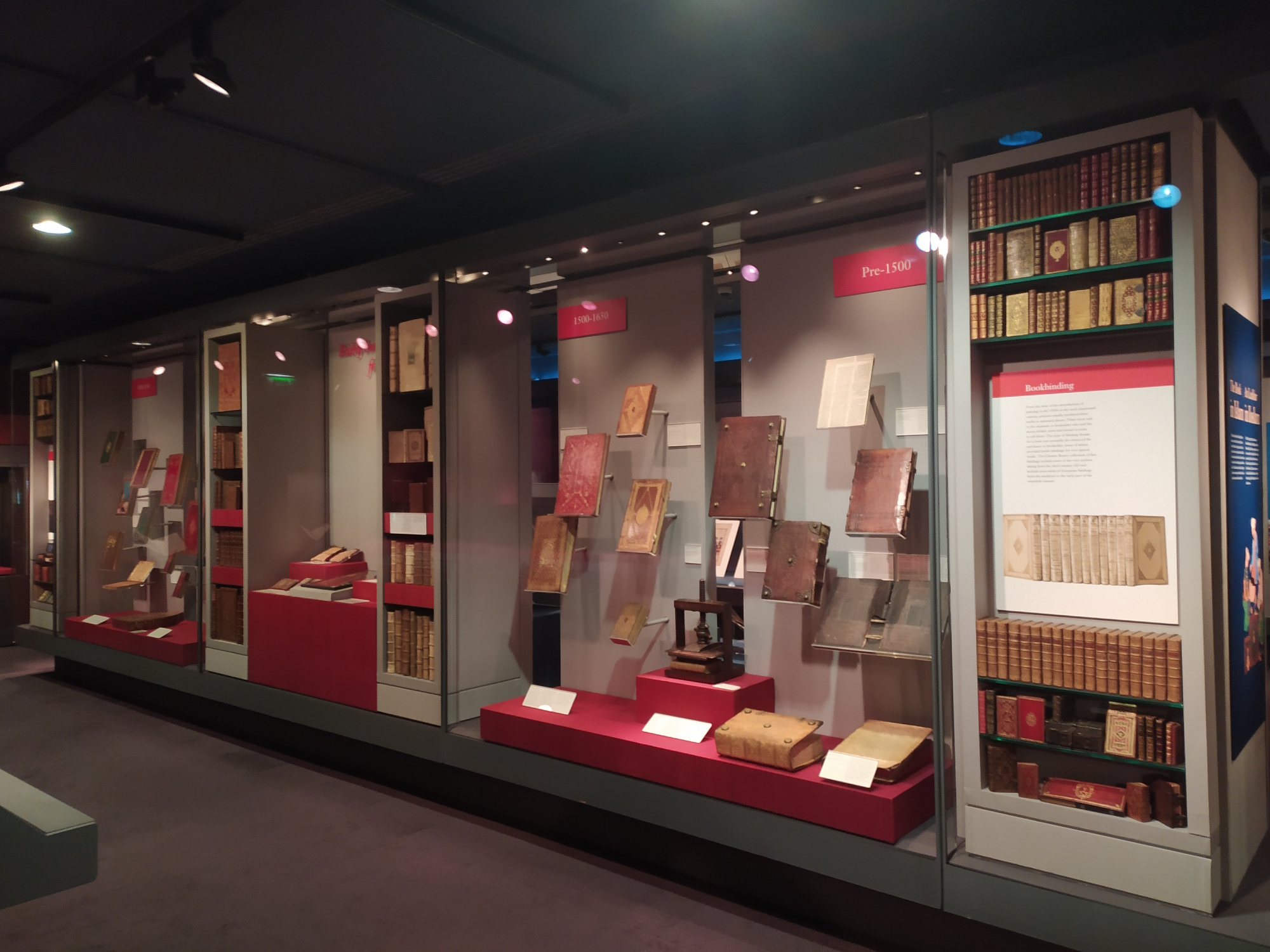
Secured display cabinets at Chester Beatty Library

=== Theft and vandalism ===
Collections maintenance assists in maintaining the security and safety of each object. Collections are kept safe by assessment of risks within facilities, and protecting these objects based on their value, rarity, portability and/or accessibility by potential thieves or vandals. Collections maintenance professionals safeguard objects on display with locked cabinets, vitrines, or stanchions. In storage, objects are protected inside vaults with locks and security systems, in addition to limiting and/or restricting access amongst staff members.

=== Custodial neglect ===
Custodial neglect is a broad term that encompasses various scenarios which can result in damage to or loss of usefulness of an object. Examples of custodial neglect include a lack of environmental monitoring, abandonment of a collection to save money, loss of "documentation that gives value to an object or that confirms the museum's right to ownership", or loss of location information which makes an object impossible to find. Rigorous information management protocols are necessary to ensure documentation is always accounted for, and administrative and/or public accountability can help maintain a high standard of collections maintenance and prevent damage or loss due to other forms of neglect.

== Storage and upkeep ==
Maintaining clean and orderly spaces ensures not only ease of accessibility but also the safety of the collections and those who work with them.

=== Environmental standards ===
Collections should be stored in an environment that is best suited to the materials that can be found in the collections and one that ensures the preservation of the collections.

=== Organization ===
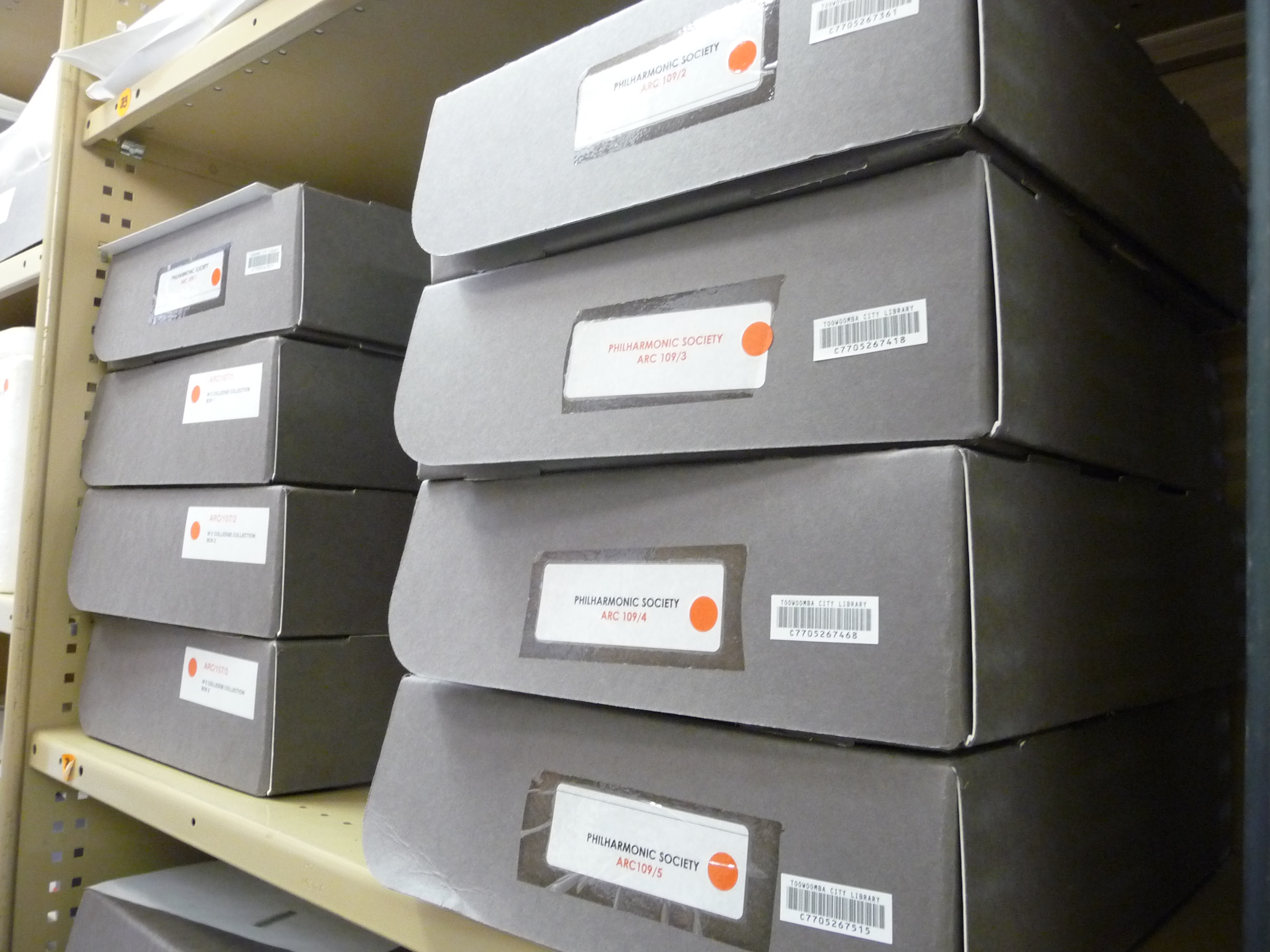
Example of two "layers;" the boxes and the shelves they rest upon

Collections should be housed and stored in an organized manner. The system may be organized by size, material, cultural or historical grouping as it applies to the collection. Structured organizational systems make identifying object locations straightforward and consistent which helps in locating an object or returning it to its proper space. No matter how a collection is organized, documentation and systems of calling up location information, such as databases or Collections Management Systems (CMS) are vital tools to ensure efficient access to and tracking of objects. A variety of CMS software is available for purchase, and institutions should do extensive research to determine which system will provide them with the functionality needed at the price point required.

The choice of physical storage furniture used should be dictated by the type of object being stored. Some examples include "wire screens for hanging framed objects, racks for large rolled textiles, flat files or drawers, and open shelving." Likewise, material type can also guide storage room organization. For example, RH sensitive materials may be stored together in a micro climate within the larger storage facility where their environment may be more easily regulated.

One element of an organizational system is the use of "successive layers of protective envelopes and enclosures." Types of "layers" include nearly everything from storage spaces, padded shelves, non-acidic archival boxes and individual packaging. Each new layer provides additional protection by creating a micro climate buffer between an object and environmental fluctuations, light, dust and pollutants.

One useful resource for establishing or rehabilitating an organizational system within a museum or repository is the RE-ORG method developed by the International Centre for the Study of the Preservation and Restoration of Cultural Property (ICCROM). Organized in four phases, the RE-ORG method guides institutions through a quantitative and qualitative study of their existing collection and space, and helps them develop and implement an action plan to establish an efficient and sustainable organizational system. The system is based upon ten quality criteria, some of which include designating storage space solely for collections objects, never storing objects directly on the floor, the building and storage spaces offer adequate protection for collections, and every object can be accessed without moving more than two others.

=== Housekeeping ===
Housekeeping is primarily concerned with preventing damage to museum collections, also known as preventive conservation. Keeping spaces clean and clear of debris is crucial to the preservation of an object. Primarily it ensures that objects don't become over exposed to detrimental agents, like dust, but it also ensures that the areas are safe for people and objects to move within, unobstructed by potential hazards. Tasks that fall under this purview include routine inspection and dusting of work areas and objects, and general cleaning of work areas. Spaces and objects should be monitored and inspected regularly to ensure that any problem is caught and resolved quickly or note any condition change.

The regularity of dusting and cleaning will differ institution to institution, and will depend upon factors like foot-traffic, how well the space is sealed off from the outside, how long it takes for dust to build up, and the museum's housekeeping plan. As a general rule, work areas should be cleaned frequently, storage areas and furniture less so, and objects dusted occasionally and only after consulting a conservator. Inside work areas, floors should be swept or vacuumed and work surfaces should be cleared off and dusted. Storage areas likely need less frequent attention, but should still have the floors cleaned and exposed surfaces of storage furniture like shelves wiped down. Objects themselves may sometimes need dusting if they are not boxed or wrapped up. Prior to dusting an object, the condition and stability needs to be considered, and a conservator should be consulted before any attempt is made. Research should also be done into how best to clean a particular type of medium or object.

==== Documentation ====
Each institution develops a housekeeping plan individually designed for the spaces that house collections, including gallery spaces, storage areas, work and reference spaces, and curatorial offices. The housekeeping plan should be written by a curator or conservator who has expertise in the preventive care of museum objects. This plan should include a schedule of treatments, both routine and specialized, with consideration for how often tasks need to be completed. The equipment, materials, and techniques for each housekeeping task, along with who would be responsible for each task, will also be specified in the plan.

A housekeeping log should be utilized to keep track of tasks that need to be accomplished and the ones that have already been completed. Changes in the status of the collection and a pest log can also be integrated to support existing documentation. A housekeeping log should at the minimum include: task, date, notes, and staff member name.

==== Housekeeping schedule ====
Housekeeping schedule example
Daily	Walk through museum daily to alert museum staff to any potential problems, including damage, mold, pests, etc.; Vacuum non-historic carpets and walkthrough areas; Clean entrances and exits (sweep and mop)
Weekly	Vacuum floors in public areas; Clean and wash high traffic areas; Clean non-historic glass
Bi-weekly	Dust furniture; Dust exhibition cases; Vacuum floors in collection areas
Monthly	Dust tops of doors, light fixtures, window sills; Clean windows, blinds/shades, and window frames; Dust picture frames, mirrors, picture glass, and glass panels; Dust exposed objects
Quarterly	Dust/vacuum books; Dust objects in storage; Wash window panes and dust ultraviolet filtering film; Wash non-historic textiles, such as curtains
Semi-annually	Vacuum upholstered furniture with a screen; Vacuum exposed historic textiles with a screen; Dust items housed inside exhibition cases
Annually	Professionally clean historic carpets, if necessary; Dust 3D objects; Thoroughly dust under and behind furniture, including inside drawers; Unbox stored items and inspect for mold, pests, or damage

==== Housekeeping supplies ====
Possible housekeeping supplies
Object/Item	Notes
Magnetic dusting cloths	chemical free and use electrostatic charge to attract dust
Rags	100% cotton and chemical free; do not use feather dusters or cloths that have chemicals or cleansers embedded inside them
Brush	soft, natural hair artist brushes that can be used to dust small or fragile areas
Cheesecloth or Muslin	a filter to vacuum very fragile or flaking items; must be washed prior to use
Vacuum	Variable suction; a micro-tool set to vacuum small areas; HEPA (High Efficiency Particulate Air) filter, which removes 99.97% of particles 0.3 microns in diameter or above; ULPA (Ultra-Low Penetration Air) filter, which removes 99.99% of particles 0.12 microns in diameter or above; Fiberglass screen for vacuuming textiles
Gentle Disinfectant	
Dust mops	
Dust masks	
Nitrile Gloves	
Distilled Water	
Ammonia	should not be used near metals or unstable glass
Orvus cleaning solution	
Murphy's Oil Soap	for mopping floors
Renaissance Wax or Butcher's Wax	
Isopropyl Alcohol	
Basic Dust Monitoring Kit	a microscope or hand magnifying lens (x10); adhesive labels - paper, Tyvek, vinyl, or Teflon; a slide case for storage; slide frames to make samples; microscope slides

==== Housekeeping procedures ====
Housekeeping procedures by object type
Books	Avoid any cleaning procedures if spine and boards are loose or detached; Wipe/brush away from the spine, starting with the top of the book before proceeding to other sections, including the cover; For very dusty books, a low suction vacuum and a brush attachment is preferable. A micro tool attachment can also be used for small areas.
Bookshelves	Work from top to bottom and remove an entire shelf's books in order to clean; Clean with a vacuum or damp clean rag. If a damp rag is used, ensure the shelf is completely dry before returning books
Ceramics	Clean with a soft natural brush on a monthly basis. If the brush has a ferrule (metal attachment), consider covering it to avoid scratches
Ivory, Bone, Horn, and Antler	Dust with a soft brush once a year; Certain ivory and non-porous bone objects may be cleaned with water, but consult a conservator to confirm
Framed Paintings	Dust a frame that is not flaking or crumbling with a soft brush or wool duster from the top down; Buff the glass covering a painting with a soft clean cloth
Glass	Glass objects that are painted or gilded can be dusted with a dry cloth every two weeks; Dirty glass objects can be washed in a diluted solution of warm water and Orvus (or ammonia) once a year. Before washing, ensure the object has no areas of stress or previous repairs.; Wash one object at a time and change the water frequently. Use a soft clean cloth for drying.
Historic Textiles	Stable textiles can be vacuumed through a fiberglass screen; Upholstery on furniture may be vacuumed every three months through a fiberglass screen. Use a row-by-row movement to ensure the entire surface is cleaned
Metal Objects	Handle with clean gloves at all times to avoid oil deposits; Dust with a soft natural brush three times a year; Polish once a year, but only after consulting with a conservator
Mirrors	Before cleaning, ensure mirror is safely secured to the wall or have someone hold it in place; Dust from the top down; Clean with an isopropyl alcohol based glass cleaner; Historic mirrors and mercury mirrors should receive specialized care from a conservator
Wood Objects	Do not dust objects that are cracking, flaking, or lifting; Dust using a clean soft rag ensuring the rag has no loose threads. A vacuum may also be used to dust wood objects; Vacuum stable furniture surfaces with a soft brush attachment. Use the attachment parallel to the grain of the wood

== Object handling ==
Every time an object is handled, it is at risk for damage. Although high standards for general housing and for packing help eliminate direct handling and decrease chances of damage due to contact, some routine activities such as cataloging and housekeeping will often require work with collection objects. To prevent accidental damage it is important to establish guidelines for handling to be followed by all individuals in a position to come in contact with the collection.

Prior to touching an object, individuals should wash their hands and determine the most appropriate handling procedures based on the medium being handled. Metal, paper, textiles, and other porous materials require the use of cotton gloves to prevent oils from human skin tarnishing, staining, or otherwise damaging the object. Glass, glazed ceramics, and other potentially slippery surfaces should be handled using latex or vinyl gloves to prevent slippage. Prior to handling an object, it is also important to (1) take note of any structural weaknesses so that direct pressure on these areas may be avoided, (2) any clothing or accoutrements with the potential to scratch or catch on the object should be secured, and (3) the object's weight should be considered so that additional help may be requested when handling heavier objects.

It is important to examine the types of materials to be used while handling the collection. If collection objects are to be moved, the use of flatbeds, carts, dollies, or pallet lifters may be warranted, with these objects being dubbed structurally sound prior to use. Tote pans or support trays are sometimes used for smaller objects, and liners such as polyethylene foam pads, quilted furniture pads, and acid-free tissue are commonly used as an added layer of protection. When necessary, handlers may also don lab coats, safety glasses, dust masks, or respirators.

=== Display and storage housing ===
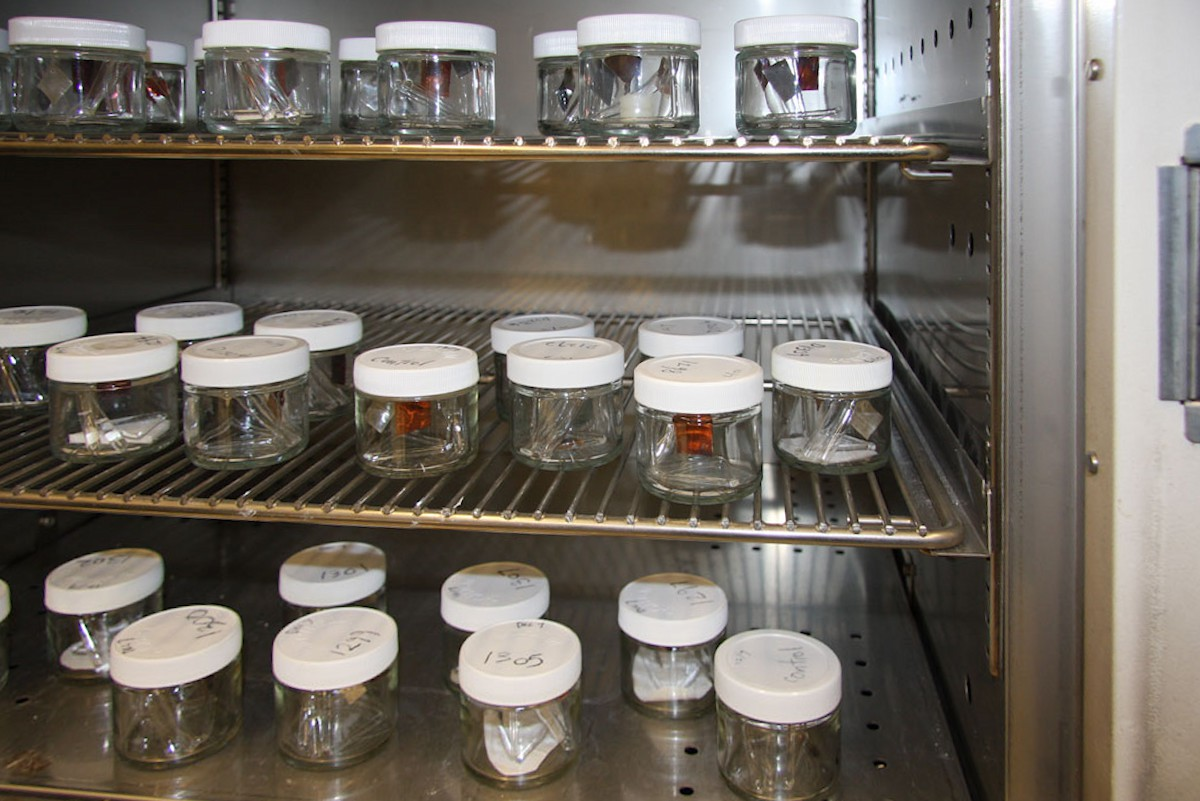
Oddy tests undergo accelerated aging in small sealed jars that are placed in an oven set at 60 degrees Celsius for four weeks.

Other than smart structural design, one of the major components of display and storage housing is proper selection of materials and collaboration with a mount maker in the creation of suitable display and storage mounts. Especially for long-term solutions, the materials that surround an object must not interfere negatively with the materials that compose the object. Experimentation using Oddy tests is a qualitative way to determine whether specific materials undergo deleterious chemical reactions in the presence of one another.

Environmental conditions as explained above are also crucial to housing decisions.

=== Packing and transport ===
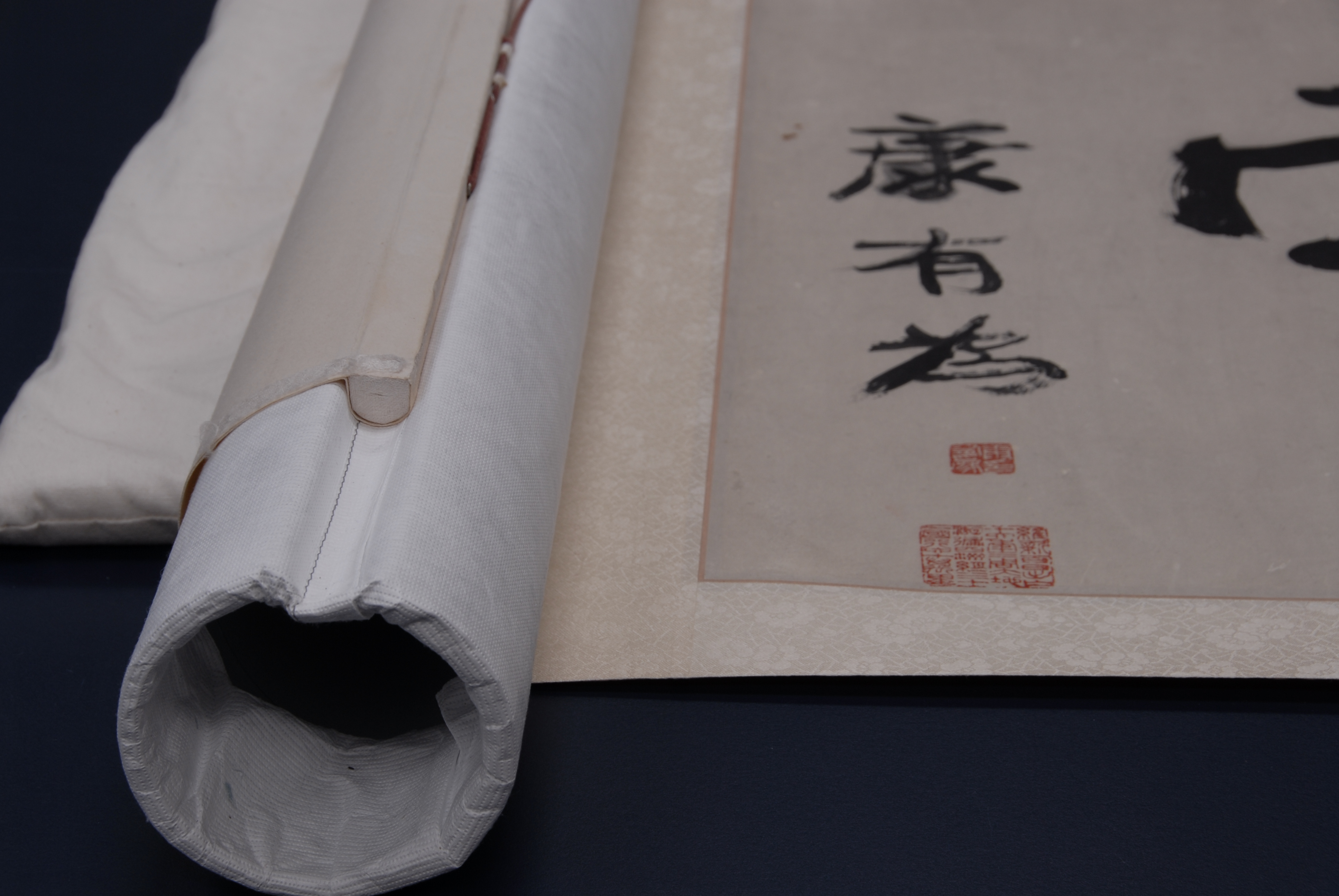
An archival tube to roll a Chinese scroll for storage.

Proper packing techniques and materials are the best way to achieve object safety during transit, and – as with nearly every aspect of preventive conservation – these must be determined in response to the particular objects involved. An ideal shipping container not only provides a shell of protection from shock, vibration, and mishandling, it also helps insulate the interior climate from fluctuating atmospheric conditions and defend against pests. Packing mounts, protective wrapping and cushioning, packing materials, crate size and layers, and means of transport are all variables which an object handler must work into an effective strategy for safe shipment.

Successful moves of the past suggest that the shipment of objects begin with a complete inventory and condition survey of the objects prior to their movement. If a large number of objects are to undergo the transition, it is recommended that a smaller, representative group be sent first to reveal any improvements that can be made for the bulk of objects. All objects should be assessed to determine whether they need stabilization before shipment; it is possible that some should not travel at all due to their condition. Often journeys require several means of transport and transitions from one shipping company to another; therefore, investigation must be done to determine the least reliable portion of the trip, and packing details should revolve around that.

Many collection departments contribute to successful object movements. Conservators, registrars, collection managers, photographers, and curators should all be involved and help contribute to clear planning and communication throughout the process. Multiple institutions are usually involved as well. The destination of the shipment must be evaluated so that the objects can be prepared adequately for transitions, including considerations for acclimatization and unpacking.

=== Dissociation ===
Dissociation is considered by the Canadian Conservation Institute as the tenth agent of deterioration. Dissociation is the result of the human error in the system.

== Preservation and preventative (or preventive) treatments ==
Preservation and preventative (or preventive) treatments are two important aspects within the practice of collections maintenance. Collections maintenance includes the daily care of collections, which is further enhanced by the principles of prevention and preservation. Preservation is the essential responsibility of collection maintenance staff, and includes the creation and maintenance of a protective environment for collections, including those in storage, on display, or in transit. An understanding of preservation principles and preventative treatments can also help collections management professionals to better understand the makeup of their collections, and thus what materials and objects are most at risk at any given time. A collections manager must be aware of all risks to the collection within a given environment and minimize these risks as much as possible. Preventative treatment (or preventive treatment) is a series of formulaic activities that are performed on objects that require more interventionist methods for preservation. Treatment is considered when an object has: a) an inherent vice that requires intervention; b) shows signs of advanced deterioration; or c) requires treatment for display, loan, or publication purposes.

Collections managers can structure their practices based on the recommendations of preservation professionals, including policies regarding storage, handling, and environmental conditions. These recommendations are documented, added to the collections database, and become part of an object's history in the future. While important, preservation treatments to objects are only sometimes deemed necessary, and there is debate on the degree of intervention that is considered best. While modern ethics advise reversible treatment practices, many treatments are not completely reversible, but can be minimized in the future, if necessary.
