= Art handler =

Person in charge of safe art movement

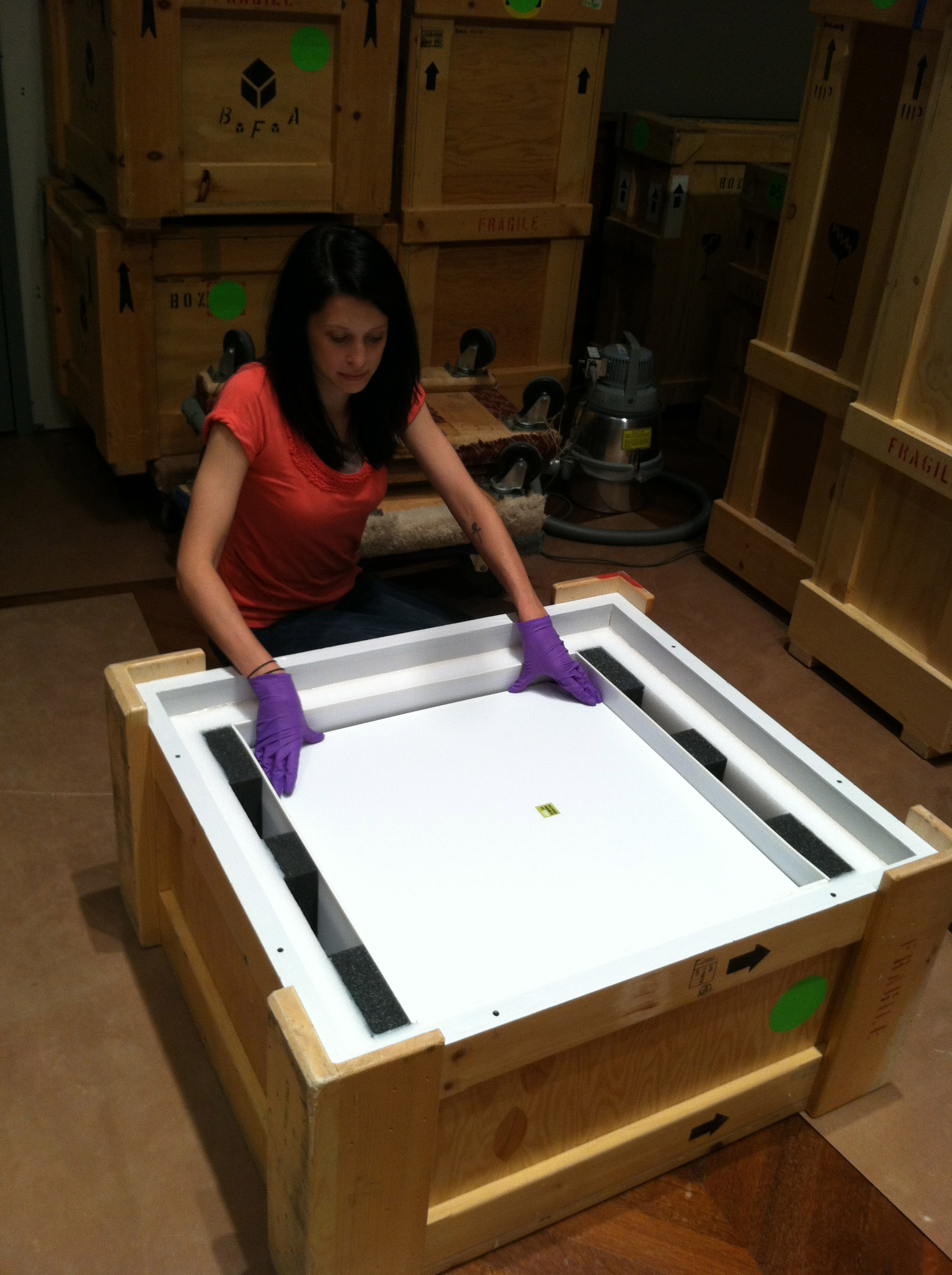
Art handler packing an artwork in a crate.

An art handler, also sometimes called an art preparator, is a trained individual who works directly with objects in museums, art galleries and various other venues including private collectors, corporate art collections, public art collections and various other institutions. Art handlers work in coordination with registrars, collection managers, conservator-restorers, exhibition designers, and curators, among others, to ensure that objects are safely handled and cared for. Often they are responsible for packing and unpacking art, installing and uninstalling art in exhibitions, and moving art around the museum and storage spaces. They are an integral part of a museum and collections care.

== Overview ==
Responsibilities of art handlers and preparators differ from institution to institution. Art handlers can be employed by museums, art galleries, private collectors, art storage facilities, or art shipping companies. Some work full-time while others work part-time or contract for one or more museums. Depending on the size and scope of an institution, some museums will have a team of art handlers for the entire museum, whereas other museums may have permanent teams of art handlers dedicated to specific museum departments.

Art handlers and preparators are first and foremost responsible for ensuring the safety of artifacts and works of art. For works traveling out of a gallery or museum, art handlers must carefully pack objects in crates with appropriate materials to protect them from damage while in transit. Some objects may require custom boxes or custom crates that art handlers and preparators might construct on site. Similarly, when objects come into a gallery or museum, art handlers must carefully unpack the objects, paying close attention to how they were originally packed and arranged in their container. Art handlers and preparators also load and unload crates from trucks. When loading crates and packages inside an art transportation truck, art handlers and preparators must be sure to secure the crates and packages to the walls and floor of the truck storage area to prevent any type of movement during transit. Art handlers may also act as a courier, accompanying the object during its transport and being present during its unpacking at the destination. Sometimes art handlers and preparators are responsible for preparing packing and shipping paperwork.

Another key role of art handlers and preparators is preparing objects for display in galleries. This may include sending objects out for conservation, framing and mounting objects, and labeling objects. Art handlers and preparators may also be responsible for working with the exhibition team to prepare the gallery spaces for the objects. They are also the individuals who physically install and deinstall the art work and artifacts in the galleries.

As a functioning part of the collection management and exhibitions team, art handlers and preparators can sometimes be responsible for photographing objects and writing condition reports. General collections care, such as monitoring environmental conditions and practicing preventive conservation in art storage spaces, are also priorities for art handlers and preparators.

== Knowledge and skills ==
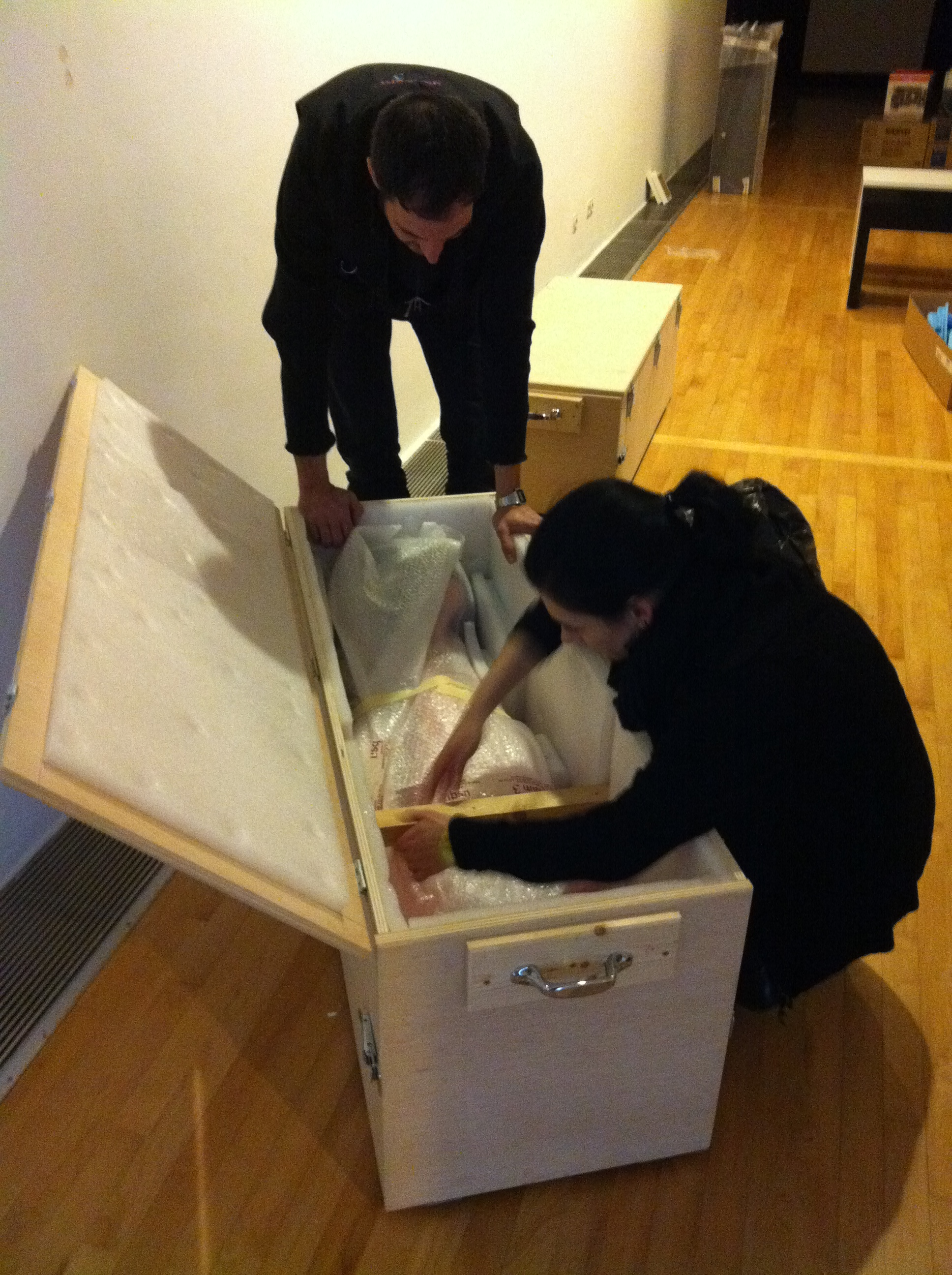
Two art handlers unpacking an artwork at Sabadell Art Museum

Art handlers must have a solid knowledge of how to handle objects safely and efficiently. They must understand the materials that make up the objects they are working with and how these materials may react with installation or packing materials. It is useful for art handlers to be spatially oriented, good at math, and possess problem solving skills. Art handlers must plan out and communicate their plan of action with the rest of the team before beginning an action.

== Education ==
Art handlers approach their careers from diverse backgrounds, including studio arts, art history, design, or production. Many art handlers are artists themselves. A high school degree and an undergraduate degree are generally required for art handlers. Some art handlers may also have academic studies in studio art, art history, humanities, or museum studies. Specialized knowledge of chemistry can be helpful to understanding potential chemical interactions between objects and packing or storage materials.

While most art handlers gain professional experience on the job, some institutions are beginning to offer training programs.

With enough experience, art handlers may work up to the titles of senior art handler, art preparator, registrar, collections manager, etc.

== Organizations ==
PACCIN is the Preparation, Art Handling, Collections Care Information Network. It is a professional subcommittee of the American Alliance of Museums. The webpage features a listserv, forums, and articles to connect object oriented museum professionals and share resources. The organization also organizes trainings and conferences across the country.

The International Convention of Exhibition and Fine Art Transporters is a network of fine art transportation companies from around the world. They function as a network to connect fine art transportation companies together in dialogue and to provide general information to the community about art transportation.

== Ethical concerns and controversies ==
As with any other object-oriented position, art handlers and preparators must abide by a code of ethics. Similar to the American Institute of Conservation's Code of Ethics, art handlers are custodians of historical and art objects and must have respect for all cultural property and prioritize the safety of objects.

A topic of controversy in the art handling field is the fair treatment of art handlers. Some art handlers wish to be represented by unions in order to negotiate terms and advocate for better wages and better working conditions. From August 2011 to June 2012, Sotheby's locked out 42 unionized art handlers whose contracts had expired and wished to negotiate new contracts. The Sotheby's art handlers were represented by Teamsters Local 814. Following the lockout, the unionized art handlers were given a one percent raise per year, a higher starting hourly salary, and the same worker's benefits they previously had.
