= Risk management for cultural heritage =

Risk management is used in a variety of ways within the cultural heritage sector: as a project management tool, for health and safety, and as part of disaster preparedness planning. Since the 1990s risk management techniques have also been used as collection management tool. Here, risk management is used to identify risks to cultural heritage collections and to establish the most effective and sustainable means to mitigate those risks.

== Risk assessment frameworks for cultural collections ==
The risk assessment methods most prominent in the conservation profession are the Cultural Property Risk Analysis Model (CPRAM), developed by Dr Robert Waller at the Canadian Museum of Nature (since 2008 at Protect Heritage Corp.), and the ABC method, developed by ICCROM and Stefan Michalski of the Canadian Conservation Institute. Both use the 'ten agents of deterioration' as an organising framework. CPRAM is designed for long-term, collection-wide planning and suits large and complex organisations. The ABC method is more suited to prioritizing risk reduction recommendations for smaller institutions.

Qualitative matrices may be used – see those used by the British Library Conservation team for in-house project management, analysis of treatment paths, and loans.

QuickScan, developed by Agnes Brokerhof and Anna Bülow, is a method that quickly prioritises and provides an overview of collection care issues which may be subjected to more detailed analysis if required.

The Preservation Needs Assessment, developed by the AICCM, is a report template which provides Australian institutions with a standardised format to determine the preservation needs and risks posed to their collections.

The ISO/IEC 31010 standard for risk assessment techniques provides 31 methods including checklists, interviews, brainstorming, decision trees and SWIFT (structured 'what if').

Methods of risk assessment may be combined to suit the context and purpose of the assessment, the needs of the collection and the resources available. In performing a risk assessment, other frameworks may be considered and incorporated, such as significance assessment and cost-benefit analysis.

== Combined methodology: Case study ==
Claire Rowson conducted a risk assessment and proposed a conservation management plan for the Perth Mint Master Tooling Collection combining methods from Significance 2.0, Agnes Brokerhof & Anna Bülow's QuiskScan, and May Cassar's Cost/Benefit Appraisals for Collection Care. The combined methodology prioritises care based on a combined matrix of highest risk posed and varied value of items in the collection.

By cross-referencing the risk posed to parts of the collection with the value of its contents it allows for prioritisation and provides multiple financial options and an understanding of the impact of each of these. Using methods which are mindful of limited time and resources allocated to collections, this strategy provides a quick and impactful graphical and tabular overview of the collection with which its managers can advocate for conservation solutions for their collections.
