= List of meeting locations of the Midwest Regional Conservation Guild =

This is a list of Annual Meeting locations for the Midwest Regional Conservation Guild (MRCG), which has been in existence since 1980 but had its first meeting in 1981.

List of Annual Meeting locations for the MRCG
Year	Season	City	Location
1980	Fall	Indianapolis	Indianapolis Museum of Art
1981	Spring	Cleveland	Cleveland Museum of Art
1981	Fall	Detroit	Detroit Institute of Arts
1982	Spring	Cincinnati	Cincinnati Art Museum
1982	Fall	Nashville	Tennessee State Museum
1983	Spring	Chicago	Art Institute of Chicago
1983	Fall	Bloomington	Indiana University
1984	Spring	Ann Arbor	University of Michigan
1984	Fall	Oberlin	Intermuseum Conservation Association
1985	Spring	Cincinnati	Cincinnati Art Museum
1985	Fall	Indianapolis	Indianapolis Museum of Art
1986	Spring	Nashville	Tennessee State Museum
1986	Fall	Cleveland	Cleveland Museum of Art
1987	Spring	Toledo	Toledo Museum of Art
1987	Fall	St. Louis	Saint Louis Art Museum
1988	Spring	Buffalo	Buffalo State College
1988	Fall	Chicago	Art Institute of Chicago
1989	Spring	Pittsburgh	Carnegie Museum of Art
1989	Fall	Kansas City	Nelson-Atkins Museum of Art
1990	Spring	Detroit	Detroit Institute of Arts
1990	Fall	Cleveland	Cleveland Museum of Art
1991	Spring	Lexington	Kentucky Horse Park
1991	Fall	Indianapolis	Indianapolis Museum of Art
1992	Spring	Nashville	The Hermitage
1992	Fall	Minneapolis	Minneapolis Institute of Art
1993	Spring	New Harmony	New Harmony
1993	Fall	Cincinnati	Cincinnati Art Museum
1994	Spring	Saint Louis	Missouri Historical Society
1994	Fall	Pittsburgh	Carnegie Museums of Pittsburgh
1995	Spring	Dearborn	The Henry Ford
1995	Fall	Cleveland	Cleveland Museum of Art
1996	Spring	Harrodsburg	Pleasant Hill Shaker Village
1996	Fall	Indianapolis	Indianapolis Museum of Art
1997	Spring	Kansas City	Nelson-Atkins Museum of Art
1997	Fall	Chicago	Chicago Historical Museum
1998	Spring	Bloomington	Indiana University
1998	Fall	New Harmony	New Harmony
1999	Spring	Columbus	Columbus Museum of Art
1999	Fall	Des Moines	State of Iowa Historical Building
2000	Spring	–	–
2000	Fall	Memphis	Elvis Presley's Heartbreak Hotel With pre-conference workshop sponsored by the MRCG: Digital Technology for Conservation, led by Tim Vitale.
2001	Fall	–	–
2002	Fall	Nashville	Frist Center for the Visual Arts Symposium co-sponsored by the MRCG and the Southeast Regional Conservation Association (SERCA) entitled "The Care of Contemporary Art: Who Decides?"
2003	Fall	Detroit	Detroit Institute of Arts With pre-conference workshop co sponsored by the MRCG, Chicago Area Conservation Guild, American Institute for Conservation, and the Detroit Institute of Arts entitled "Art in Transit."
2004	Fall	Cleveland	Cleveland Museum of Art With pre-conference symposium sponsored by the MRCG entitled "The Latest Trends in Museum Storage."
2005	Fall	Indianapolis	Indianapolis Museum of Art
2006	Fall	Cincinnati	Cincinnati Art Museum
2007	Fall	Chicago	Chicago Historical Museum Followed by a workshop co-sponsored by the MRCG, American Institute for Conservation entitle "Mastering Fills."
2008	Fall	Kansas City	Nelson-Atkins Museum of Art
2010	Spring	Detroit	Detroit Institute of Arts This meeting was the postponed 2009 meeting.
2010	Fall	Louisville	Filson Historical Society
2011	Fall	Toledo	Toledo Museum of Art
2012	Fall	Bloomington	Indiana University Art Museum
2013	Fall	Cleveland	Cleveland Museum of Art
2014	Fall	Minneapolis	Midwest Art Conservation Center
2015	Fall	Ann Arbor	Kelsey Museum of Archaeology
2016	Fall	Cooperstown	Golden Artist Colors, The Otesaga Resort Hotel
2017	Fall	Cincinnati	Cincinnati Museum of Art
2018	Fall	Saint Louis	Saint Louis Art Museum
2019	Fall	New Harmony	New Harmony Inn Resort and Conference Center
2020	Fall-Winter	Virtual	co-hosted with the Chicago Area Conservation Group
2021	Fall	Indianapolis	Indiana State Library Pre-conference sessions: Portfolio Day coordinated by ECPN, and a Bruker XRF workshop taught by Nigel Kelly
2022	Fall	Detroit	Detroit Institute of Art: Detroit Film Theater Pre-conference session: Gels Workshop taught by Sophie Barbisan
2023	Fall	Kansas City, MO	National WWI Museum and Memorial Pre-conference session: Bruker (handheld Raman and FTIR), hosted at the University of Kansas Library conservation lab
2024	Fall	Columbus	Helen Haddad Hall In partnership with Exhibit Columbus Pre-conference session: Hydrogels in Conservation Workshop taught by Matt Cushman, hosted at the Eskenazi Museum of Art at Indiana University
