= List of conservation organizations =

List of conservation organizations may refer to:

- List of nature conservation organizations
- List of cultural conservation and restoration organizations
