= Agents of deterioration =

Major causes of damage to cultural heritage

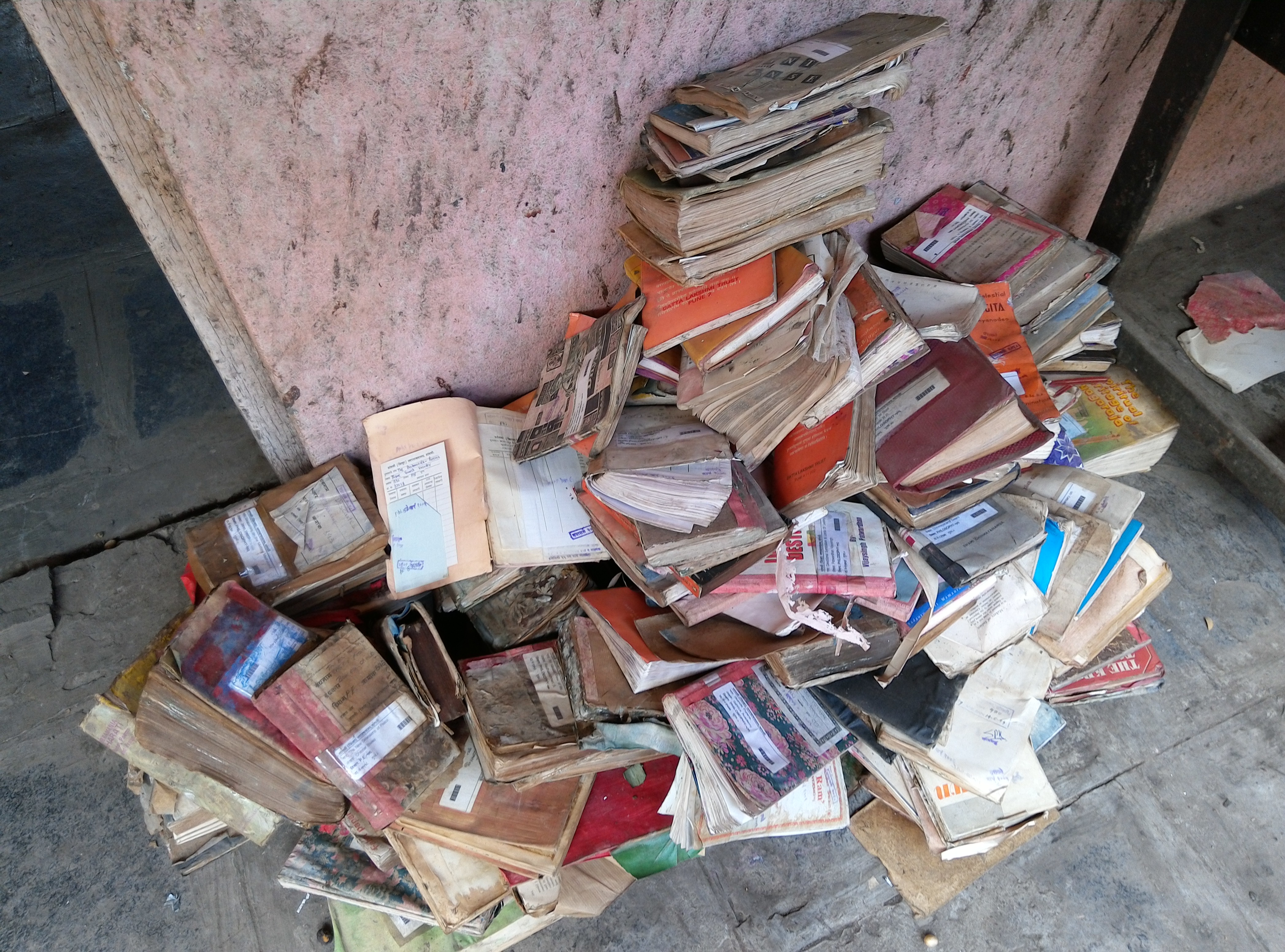
Water is one of the agents of deterioration. Its effects can be seen in these flood-damaged library books.

The "ten agents of deterioration" are a conceptual framework developed by the Canadian Conservation Institute (CCI) used to categorise the major causes of change, loss or damage to cultural heritage objects (such as collections held by galleries, libraries, archives and museums). Also referred to as the "agents of change", the framework was first developed in the late 1980s and early 1990s. The defined agents reflect and systematise the main chemical and physical deterioration pathways to which most physical material is subject. They are a major influence on the applied practice of conservation, restoration, and collection management, finding particular use in risk management for cultural heritage collections.

CCI defines ten 'agents': dissociation, fire, incorrect relative humidity, incorrect temperature, light and ultraviolet light, pests, pollutants (or contaminants), physical forces, thieves and vandals, and water. The number of primary agents has remained the same since the 1994 addition of "custodial neglect" (now termed dissociation), though the scope and names of some categories have been updated over time to reflect new research or thinking.

Each category may be further subcategorised as rare and/or catastrophic (Type 1), sporadic (Type 2), or constant/ongoing (Type 3), particularly when applied to risk assessments. For example, within the category of physical forces, an earthquake may be designated a Type 1 event; a handling accident where an object is dropped as Type 2, and ongoing physical wear from daily handling as Type 3.

== Dissociation ==
Dissociation refers to the loss of information associated with an object, such as provenance or location information, without which the object loses significance or is lost. In earlier versions of the framework this was referred to as "custodial neglect". Dissociation can cover loss of identification labels, misplacement of parts of an object, lack of descriptive information for example. Neglecting a collection is also part of dissociation. By not doing the proper research and not making sure object pairs or groups stay together, institutions can lose important information and cause their collections to lose value. Dissociation can also occur as a result of natural disasters.

In order to prevent dissociation, a number of actions can be taken preemptively. Having a documentation plan and a functional backup for electronic systems can help mitigate the damages done by events we cannot control. Rigorous information management protocols are necessary, such as regular collection audits and administrative reviews. Consistent and clear documentation practice and accurate labeling are essential to help prevent dissociation.

== Fire ==
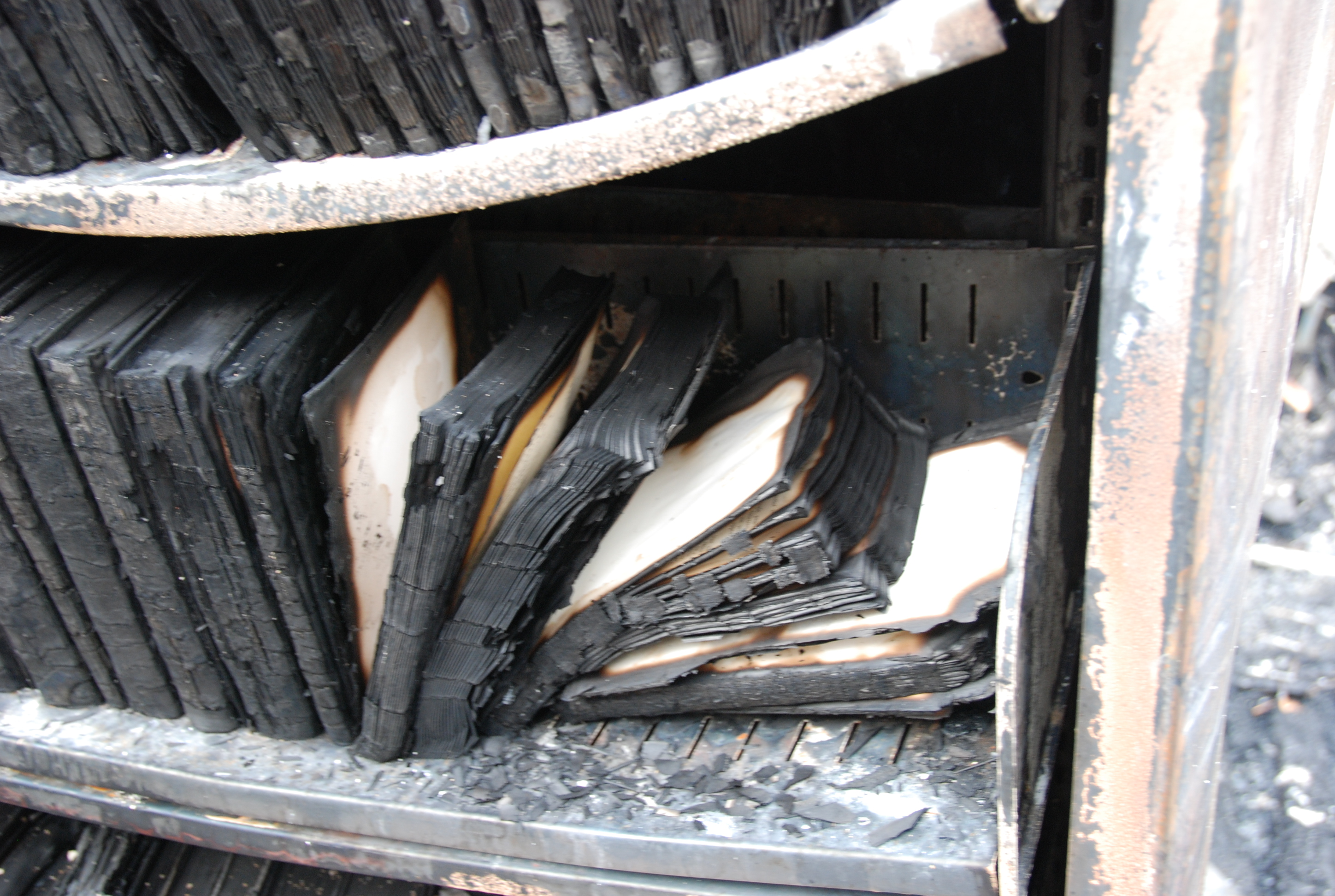
Fire damaged records

Fire directly consumes cultural heritage through burning or by the deposition of smoke and soot on surfaces. Fire suppression systems can also cause damage—i.e. water damage from sprinklers. For example, about 18 million objects were destroyed in the 2018 fire at the National Museum of Brazil.

Preventive maintenance is critical to prevent and minimize the risk of fire. Strategies include banning smoking and other sources of flame and heat, routine maintenance of fire extinguishers, maintaining a regular schedule for the maintenance and testing of smoke detectors, and protecting the building and contents with sprinkler systems.

Materials can be classified based on their level of vulnerability to heat and combustion. Jean Tetrault identified five levels of sensitivity—from very low for non-combustible materials to very high for self-igniting, easily combustible materials. Inorganic materials, such as ceramics, stone, glass, and metal, have lower relative sensitivity to fire, as compared to organic materials, such as wood, paper, or textile, that are highly reactive to fire. Certain materials are known for their extremely high relative sensitivity to fire, such as organic solvents with a flash point below 32 °C that makes them flammable and most dangerous if it goes below 21 °C.

An object’s susceptibility to fire is a salient factor that affects the rate at which fire can spread within space. Considering that fire is an exothermic chain reaction that produces energy in the form of light and heat, for the chain reaction to persist, the fuel must be in a suitable condition and quantity. If the material is wet, the heat produced will react first with water to remove moisture instead of directly causing the fuel to break down and cause the chain reaction to continue should there be enough fuel source to feed on.

== Incorrect relative humidity ==
Relative humidity (RH) may result in change or damage to cultural heritage when the RH is too high, too low or when it fluctuates. High RH can cause mould growth, salt efflorescence, increased pest activity, swelling of wood, rapid metal corrosion and accelerated hydrolysis reactions in paper and other substrates. Low RH can result in cracking and shrinkage of wooden objects, and desiccation and embrittlement of paper and organic textiles. Fluctuations in RH compound these effects and cause physical damage where organic materials contract and expand, particularly in mixed-media objects where materials expand and contract at different rates (e.g. panel paintings). For this reason, museum environments often have humidity control as part their heating, ventilation and cooling (HVAC) system, to keep RH stable and within defined limits.

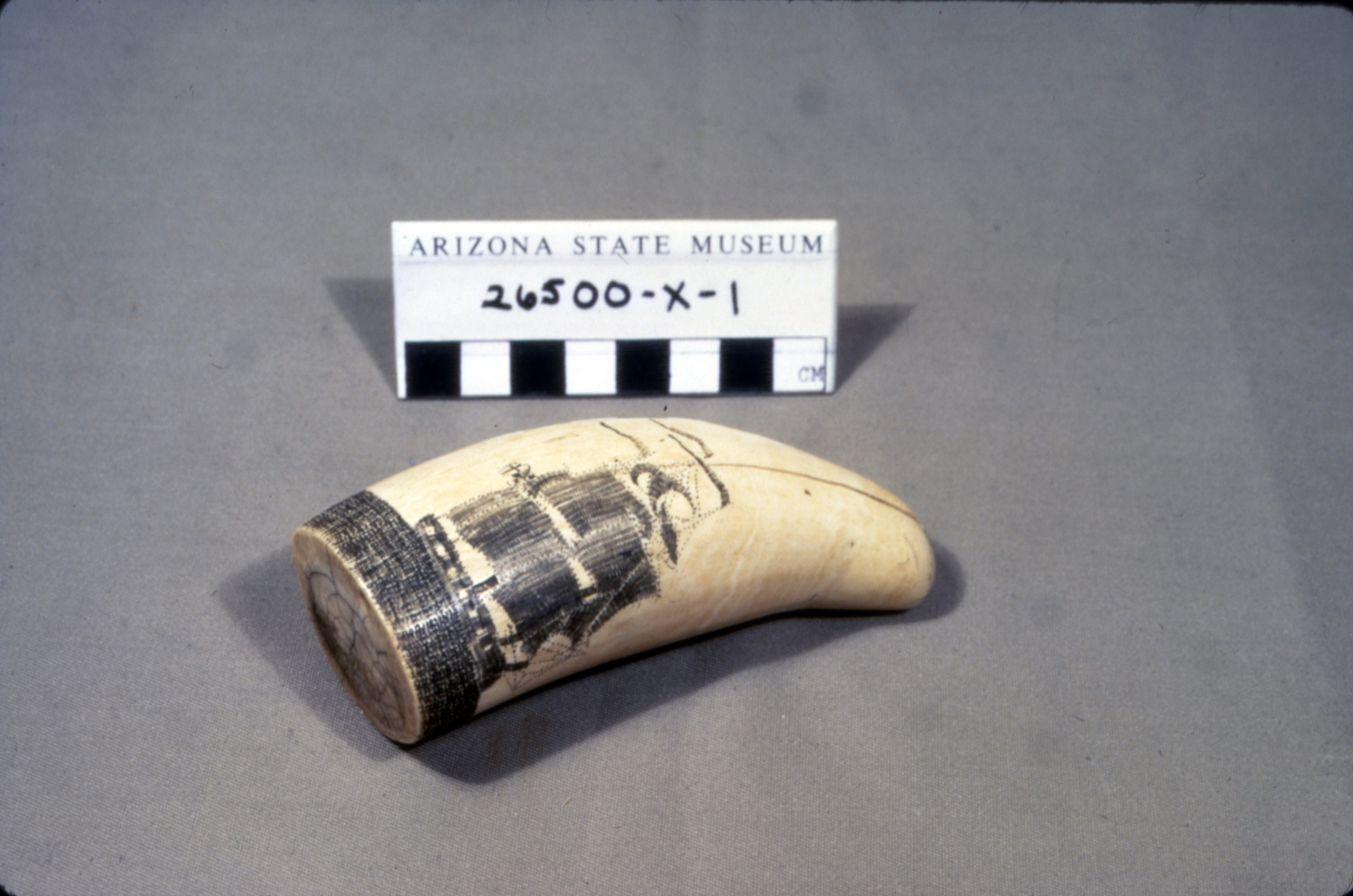
Whale tooth, Scrimshaw. Split due to humidity affecting bone and ivory.

Relative humidity is the amount of water held in the air expressed as a percentage of the total amount of water that could be held in fully saturated air at a given temperature. The capacity of air to hold moisture is directly related to temperature, as warm air can hold more water than cold air.

Some changes undergone by objects are reversible by adjusting the RH, but damage like cracks may be irreversible. Keeping the RH within an appropriate range for the type of material and as consistent as possible will prevent most RH-based damage. Keeping storage and display spaces between 40-60% RH will avoid most damaging effects, but maintaining a stable RH is often considered more important than adhering to absolute ranges. Guidelines for museum environments have been developed by professional conservation organisations such as the International Institute for Conservation (IIC), the International Council of Museums (ICOM-CC), the American Institute for Conservation (AIC) and the Australian Institute for the Conservation of Cultural Materials (AICCM).

The RH of spaces can be measured by a number of tools, including humidity indicator cards, thermo-hygrographs, hygrometers, psychrometers and data loggers. RH data is monitored and analysed to determine if adjustments are needed. Adjustments may be possible via humidifiers, dehumidifiers, adjustments to existing heating and air conditioning systems, and passive control measures.

Some objects have different needs in RH than the other ones in their exhibition or their storage room. For those objects, special cases or storage containers needs to be created to accommodate their needs. In them, the Rh and the temperature can be different than the ones present of the rooms. Some special crates and containers can also be done to ensure the safe travel of the objects.

== Incorrect temperature ==
Two primary chemical deterioration mechanisms affecting cultural heritage include hydrolysis and oxidation, which can result in chain scission or cross linking. These occur at ambient temperatures to varying degrees (depending on the material); the rate of chemical reactions increases with temperature. Consequently, cool storage (e.g. storage at 10 °C, 4 °C or below freezing) is often used to slow the deterioration of vulnerable materials such as cellulose nitrate and cellulose acetate film.

Higher temperatures may also cause softening or melting of material with low melting points, such as waxes and some plastics. Some materials become brittle with lower temperatures, increasing the chance of physical damage on handling. On freezing, ice crystals can physically disrupt delicate surfaces such as photographic emulsions.

== Light, ultraviolet and infrared ==
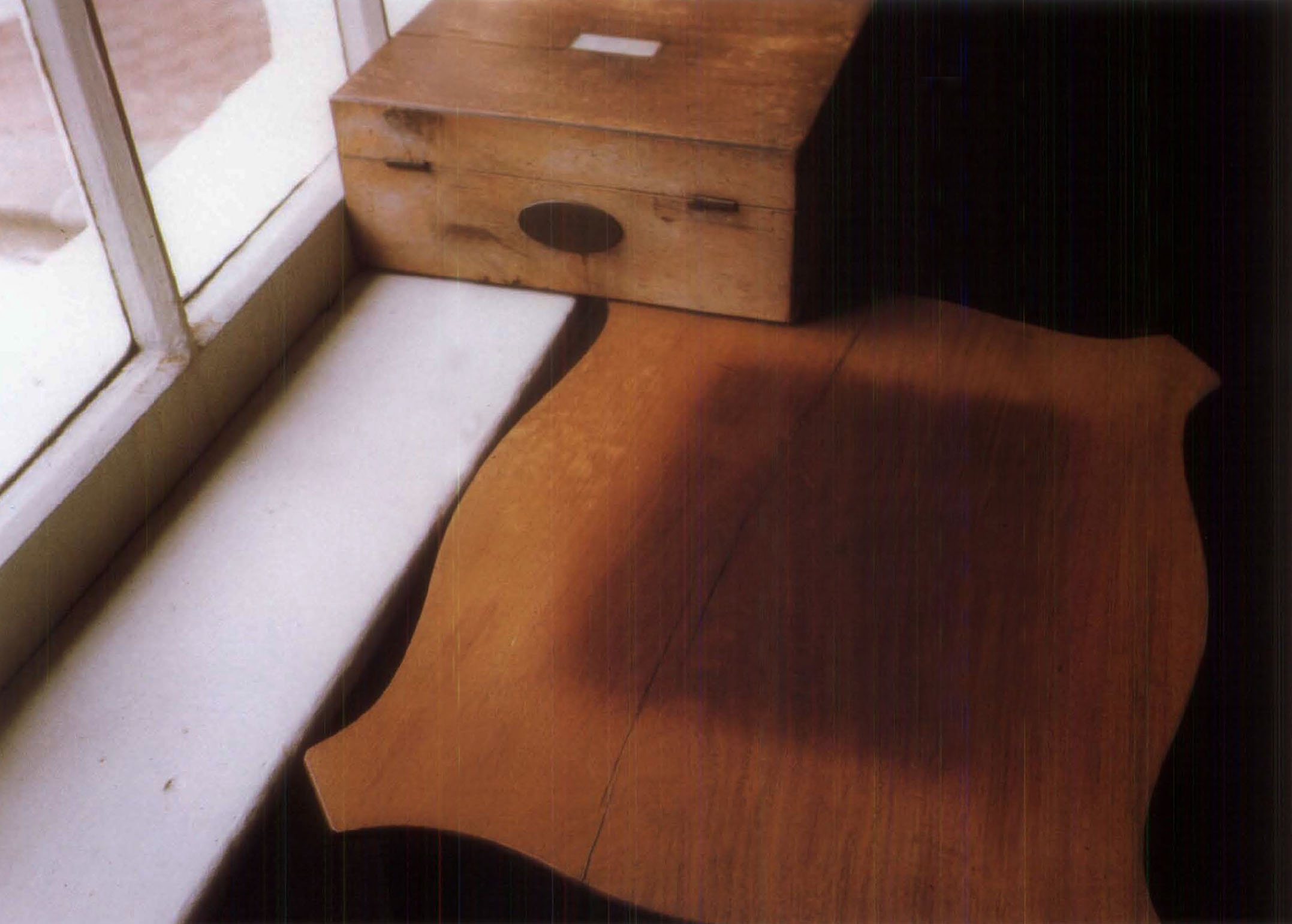
Light has faded the finish of the table top except in the center, where the box rested and shielded the finish

Light, as it relates to collections maintenance, is primarily concerned with the visual and ultraviolet light (UV) ranges of the electromagnetic spectrum. Visible light exposure will fade many colourants. Higher energy ultraviolet light wavelengths can also cause bleaching, yellowing, discolouration and physical weakening of substrates, rendering some material brittle and prone to breakage. Light radiation provides energy to induce chemical changes within the molecular structure of materials. Damage from light, including loss of color and strength, is cumulative and irreversible.

Controlling light damage is a process of compromise, as light is also necessary for people working with or viewing cultural heritage objects. Light exposure can be reduced by limiting either the amount of time sensitive objects are put on display, or the strength at which they are illuminated. Dimmers, timer switches, and motion sensors may be used to limit exposure times. Cultural organisations often develop schedules for exhibition changeovers, in order to control the rate at which light-induced damage occurs. Light levels for light sensitive objects such as textiles, works on paper, and dyed leather are generally kept at lower levels where possible (e.g at 50 lux), with 200 lux a more common guidelines for more light resistant materials, such as oil paintings, bone, and natural leather. Some material types, such as stone, metal, and glass, are not negatively impacted by visible light.

Ultraviolet light is not normally needed for vision (unless UV-induced fluorescence is an important part of the viewing experience) so cultural organisations tend to remove or shield sources of natural light from storage or display spaces. Curtains, shades and UV-absorbing filters are also useful control strategies.

Light and UV levels can be measured with a light meter so that adjustments can be made.

== Pests ==
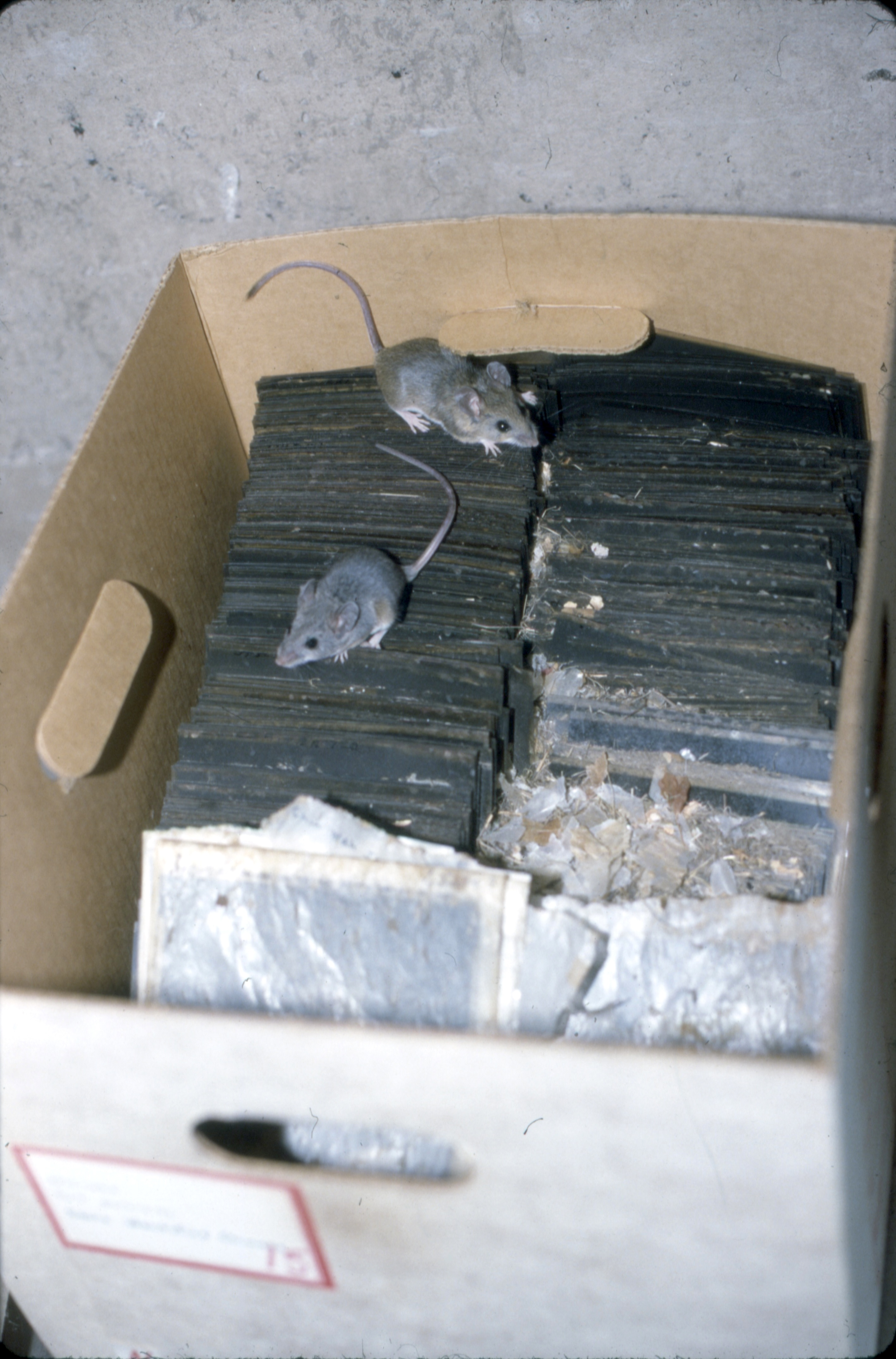
Rodent damaged photo negatives at Fort Huachuca, Arizona, 1985.

Many insect species feed on organic cultural heritage material - for example, carpet beetles and clothes moths are attracted to protein-based fibres such as wool and silk; silverfish graze on the surface of books and photographs; various species of borers can infest wooden furniture or frames. Insects can be attracted by accumulation of dust and debris on objects to feed on it. Insects, birds and rodents may use cultural heritage objects as nesting material, or soil them with excrement, or damage them by scratching or piercing. Bird poo can etch the surface of metal outdoor sculpture and birds' feet can scratch their surface.

Damage from insects and other museum pests typically occurs because these pests are drawn to collections objects which they view as a food source. Certain material types, such as wood, organic textiles, furs, and paper are more vulnerable to insect damage than others.

Integrated pest management or IPM has become a key strategy in monitoring and controlling pests in museum environments. IPM focusses on prevention, through housekeeping and maintenance, and monitoring pest populations by using a system of glue traps. This allows museum or repository staff to identify vulnerable locations, catch new infestations and identify the type of insects present, and then act to eliminate the infestation.

A range of possible treatments are available to address insect infestations. Chemical treatments are no longer a preferred treatment method for cultural objects due to human safety risks and often undesirable effects on the objects themselves. Instead, non-chemical methods are preferred, and include freezing, controlled heating, radiation, and anoxic treatments. Even options as simple as regulating the temperature and relative humidity of a space can be effective at curtailing an infestation, depending on the pest. Each option has benefits and drawbacks, and the choice of treatment used should be undertaken in consultation with a qualified professional.

== Pollutants ==
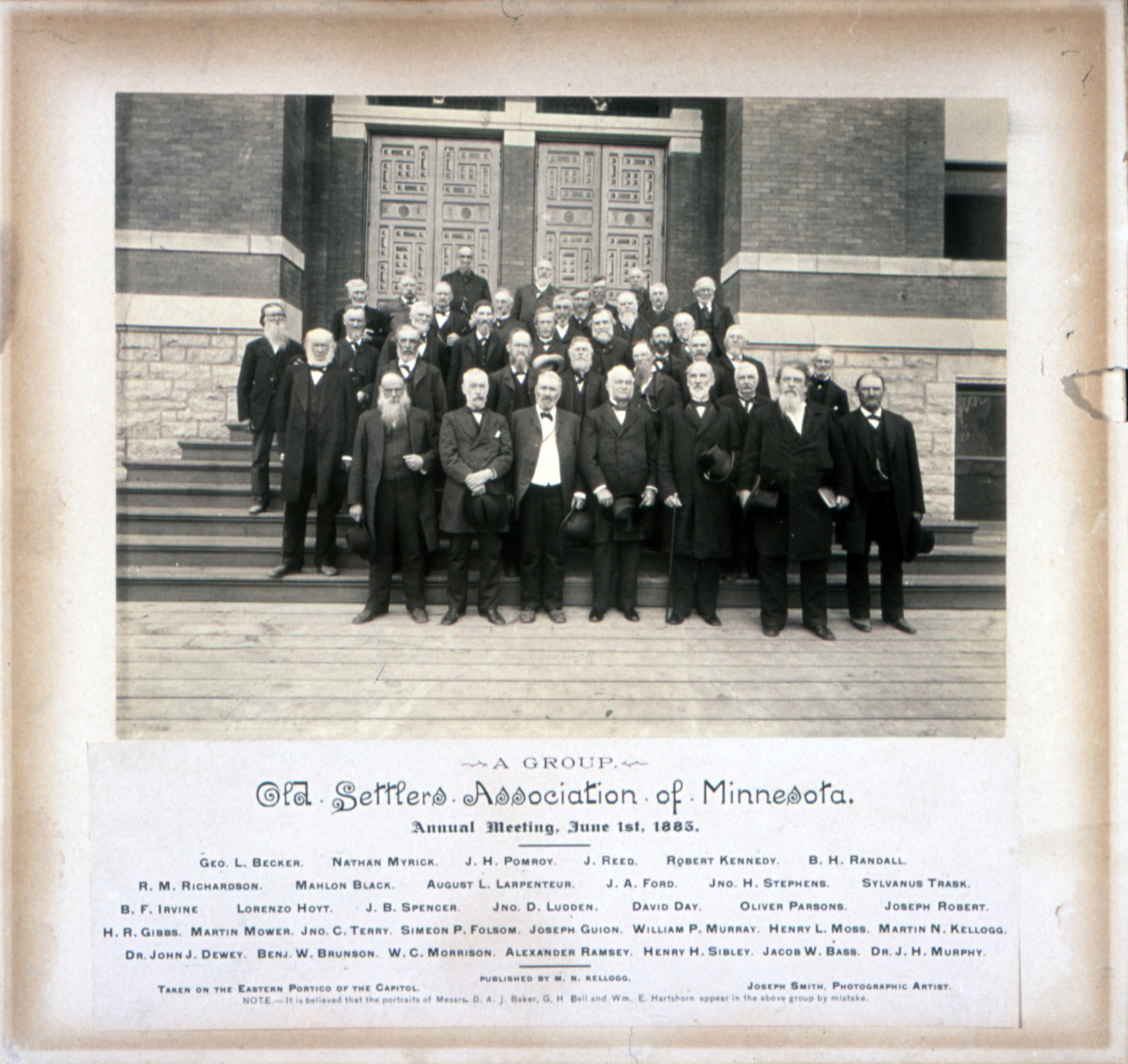
Mat burn due to acids released from non-archival mat boards over time.

Atmospheric pollutants such as ozone, sulphur dioxide, hydrogen sulphide and nitrogen dioxide cause corrosion, acidification and discolouration of a variety of materials. Indoor pollutants such as formaldehyde and other volatile organic acids cause similar problems, and may be present in carpets, paints and varnishes or in the materials used to construct display cases or storage furniture (wood, plastics, fabrics, resins). Pollutants may also be generated internally by objects - for example, the deterioration of cellulose acetate film results in the generation of acetic acid, which can damage other objects nearby.

Atmospheric pollutants can tarnish or corrode metal objects. Silver objects are vulnerable to sulphurous gases which cause them to tarnish, and lead and pewter objects will corrode when exposed to volatile organic acids. Damage can be minimised by storing vulnerable silver objects in enclosures with activated charcoal or in silvercloth, which absorb sulphur. Silver objects can also be coated, or lacquered, with a clear barrier material such as Paraloid B-72 to prevent tarnishing, but these coatings require periodic reapplication. One potential source of volatile organic acids is wooden shelves or wooden storage and display furniture.

Dust is also categorised as an outdoor and indoor pollutant in this context, as it can cause damage to the surface by abrasion when removed, or by staining it when absorbing humidity. Dust can contain skin, mold and inorganic fragments like silica or sulfur. Dust can become bound to a surface over time, making it significantly more difficult to remove. Dust is also hygroscopic, meaning it is able to attract and hold water molecules creating an ideal climate for mold spores to grow and cause biological damage. Dust's hygroscopic nature can also prompt chemical reactions on a surface, especially upon metals. Inorganic dust particles may have tough sharp edges which can tear fibers and abrade softer surfaces if not properly removed.

Dust accumulation can be prevented by storing and displaying collection objects in closed cabinets or cases, or by using dust covers. Dust minimisation strategies also include the use of air filters in heating and air conditioning systems, using vacuum cleaners equipped with HEPA filters and housekeeping strategies using soft cloths.

== Physical forces ==
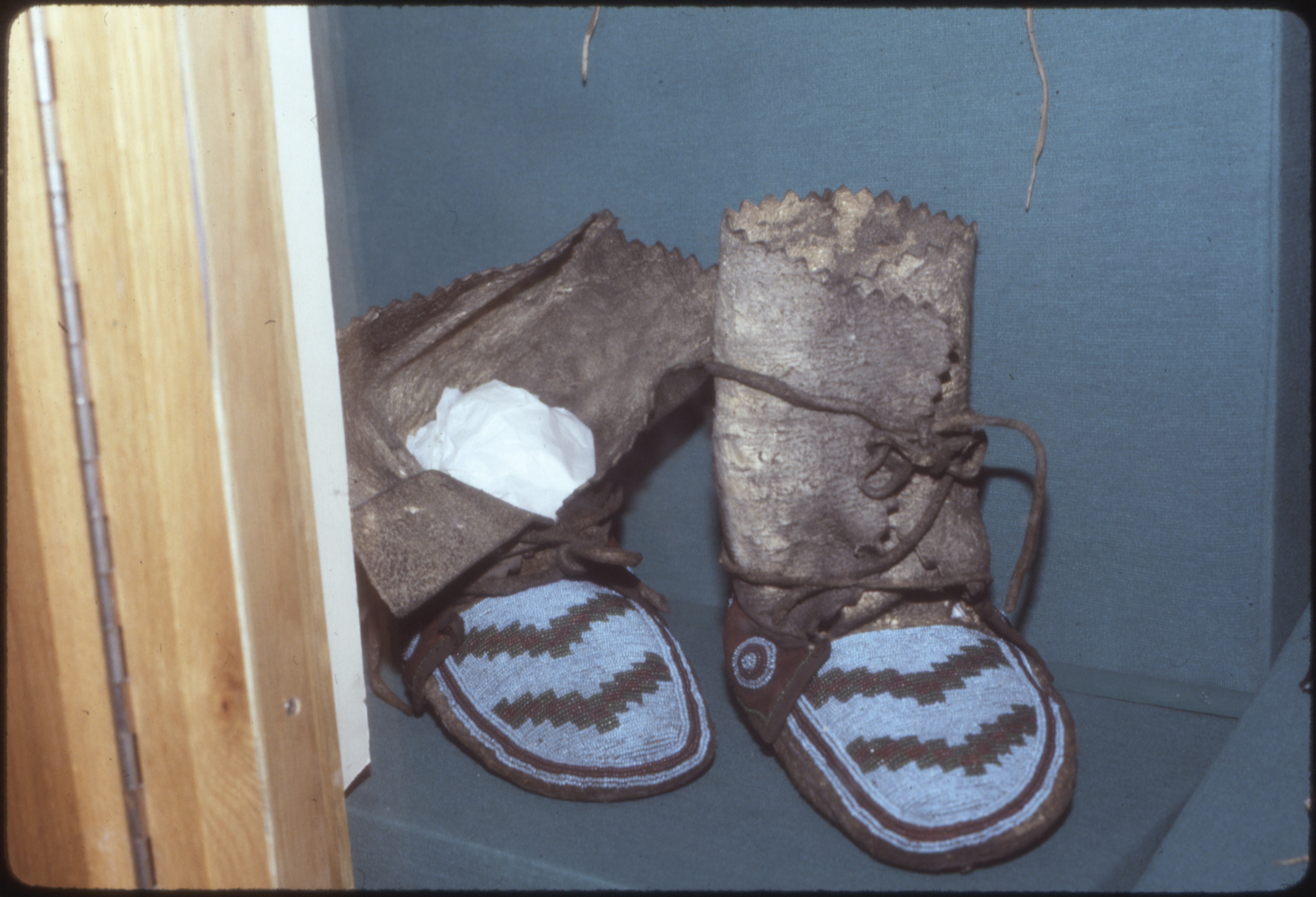
Poor support of artifact

This category includes sources of mechanical damage, where objects may be bent, broken, distorted, abraded, worn etc. The change occurs by some applied force, which may be as varied as seismic movement from earthquakes, vibration from roads, electrical equipment or amplified music, or from simple storage accidents such as shocks and rubbing or handling accidents where objects are bumped or knocked.

Handling training and guidelines help to prevent accidental damage due to physical forces when moving and working with museum objects. Handling guidelines may contain advice to carefully inspect objects before picking them up, clearing paths of obstacles and trip hazards, lining trolleys and carts for transport with polyethylene foam padding, and planning all steps of a procedure in advance". In storage, objects are housed in a manner to make them easily accessible, and fragile objects may have custom supports or mounts and padded storage boxes.

== Thieves and vandals ==
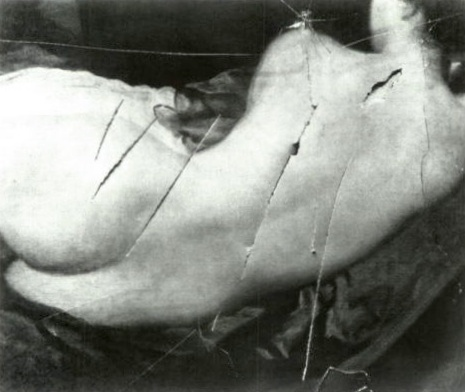
Detail showing damage done in 1914 to the Rokeby Venus by Mary Richardson

At times referred to as 'criminals', this category includes deliberate theft or damage to cultural heritage. Many famous examples exist, such as the 1990 theft of paintings from the Isabella Stewart Gardner Museum, or the 2012 attack on the Rothko painting at the Tate Gallery, though it is possible many thefts go unreported or even unnoticed in large institutions, or when inventory checks are not frequent.

Control strategies include limiting access to collections based on their value, rarity, portability and/or accessibility, both to staff and potential visitors. Storage and display furniture may be locked and alarmed. Cultural organisations may install security cameras, motion sensors and alarms and employ security guards and patrols.

== Water ==
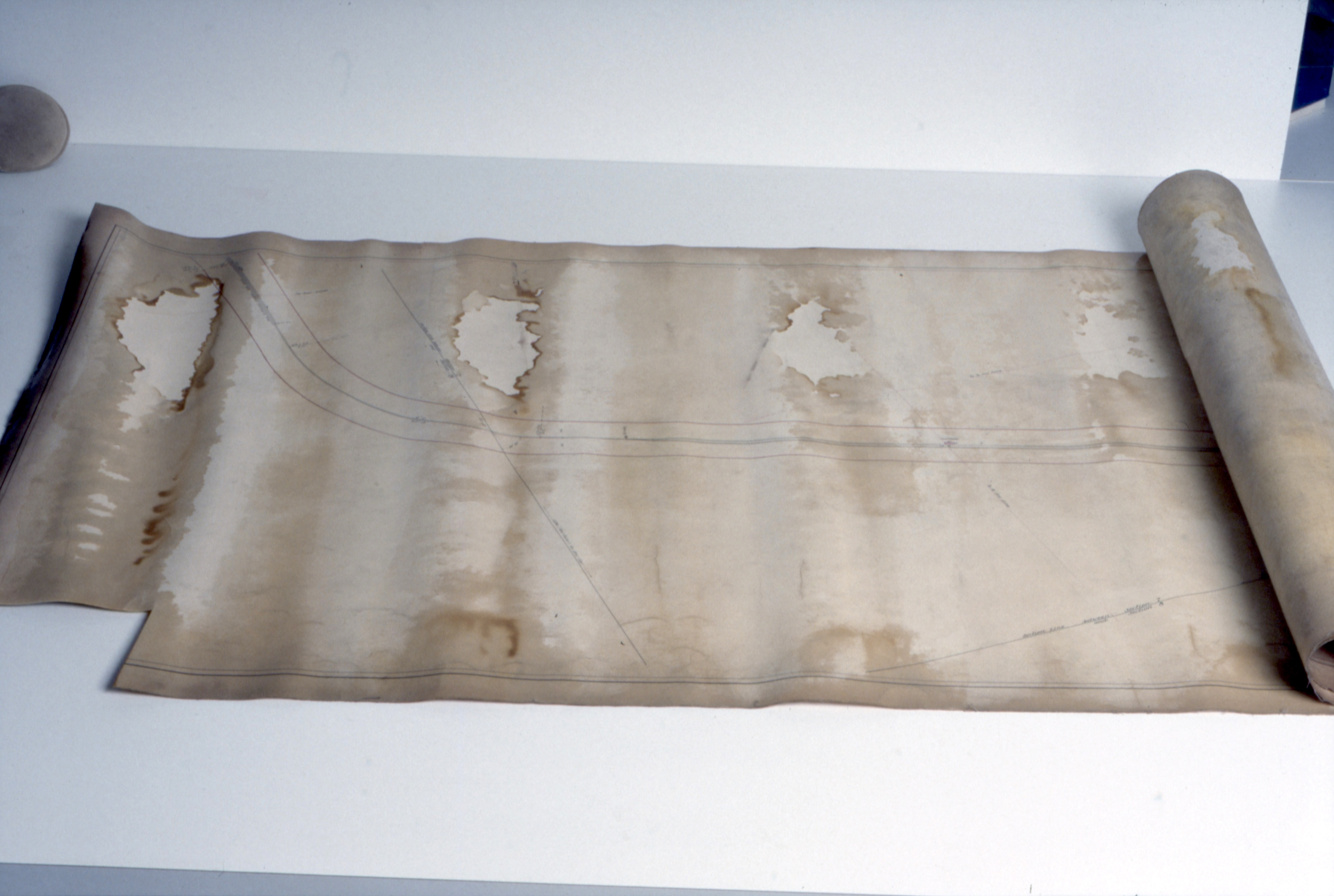
Water-damaged paper map

Water damage usually occurs through leaks in building fabric or through flooding associated with weather events or the failure of water-carrying infrastructure (plumbing, wet pipe sprinkler systems, air conditioning). Condensation may occur where the temperature of the air drops suddenly, as when warm indoor air hits a cooler external wall or window. Water may soften or solubilise applied media (paints, adhesives, coatings), cause staining and leave tidelines after evaporation, cause physical damage through impact, weaken substrates and foster microorganism growth, and swell, shrink or distort organic materials. Water can also carry pollutants and contaminants, such as mud and sewage, which leave stains. The 1966 Florence flood was a formative moment in the development of the conservation-restoration profession and particularly preventive conservation.

== Other frameworks ==
This is not the only framework used to categorise the deterioration of materials in cultural heritage professions. For example, deterioration may also be categorised according to source: biological, chemical, physical.

== Sustainability ==
The ten agents of deterioration are often used to frame discussions about sustainability in the cultural heritage sector, when the cost of controlling or minimising deterioration is compared to the perceived benefits. Costs may be financial (e.g. the cost of running air conditioning), environmental (e.g. the use of plastics as storage and packing material, or the use of solvents for conservation treatment, or the use of energy to run air conditioning systems) or even the labour required to sustain an activity. The repercussions of established conservation-restoration practice on the environment and on climate change are increasingly debated, particularly the profession's emphasis on tight control of temperature and humidity.

Recent environmental guidelines for cultural heritage collections, such as those developed by the Australian Institute for the Conservation of Cultural Materials (AICCM), emphasise sustainability and resilience as a guiding principle and directly reference climate change as a reason for frequent review. These guidelines highlight the need to consider the local climate and allow variations of relative humidity and temperature values accordingly.

== See also ==
- Conservation and restoration of cultural property
- Disaster preparedness
