= Disaster preparedness (cultural property) =

Preserving and protecting cultural artifact collections

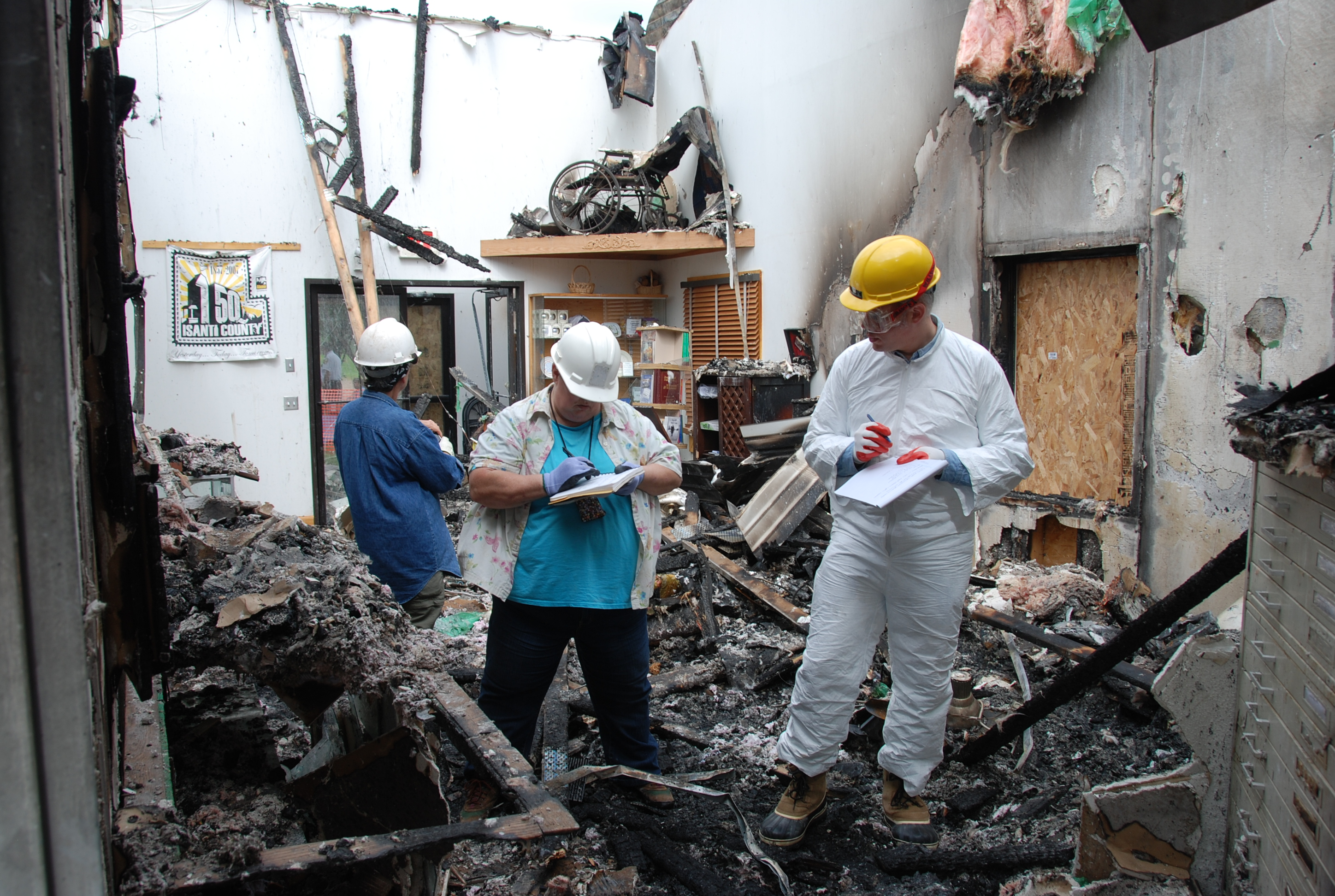
Recovery efforts after an arson-caused fire consumed newspapers, photos, documents, books, and historic artifacts in museum.

Disaster preparedness in museums, galleries, libraries, archives and private collections, involves any actions taken to plan for, prevent, respond or recover from natural disasters and other events that can cause damage or loss to cultural property. 'Disasters' in this context may include large-scale natural events such as earthquakes, flooding or bushfire, as well as human-caused events such as theft and vandalism. Increasingly, anthropogenic climate change is a factor in cultural heritage disaster planning, due to rising sea levels, changes in rainfall patterns, warming average temperatures, and more frequent extreme weather events.

The primary goal of disaster preparedness is to identify actions that can be taken to reduce either the chance of a disaster occurring or to lessen its effects. For example, clearing building gutters reduces the chance of overflow and leaks during heavy rainfall; storing collection objects inside closed cabinets reduces the chance of water damage should water leaks still occur. However, disaster preparedness is generally recognised as an ongoing process of planning, preparation, response and review in order to learn from disasters which do occur. The professions most influenced by disaster preparedness in this context include conservator-restorers, curators, collection managers, and registrars.

To plan for and prevent disasters from occurring, cultural heritage organisations will often perform a risk assessment to identify potential hazards and how they might be ameliorated. From this they will develop a disaster (or emergency) response plan that is tailored to the needs of their institution, taking into consideration factors like climate, location, and specific collection vulnerabilities. A response plan includes details such as: floor plans and evacuation routes, emergency supply locations, contact information for emergency response team members and critical stakeholders, collection priority salvage lists, and locations that can be used for emergency salvage work or storage. In some countries and jurisdictions there may be official requirements for an emergency preparedness plan, quality assurance standards, or other guidelines determined by the government or local authorities.

== Categories of disaster ==
Cultural property faces threats from a variety of sources on a daily basis, from thieves, vandals, and pests; to pollution, light, humidity, and temperature; to natural emergencies and physical forces. Effects stemming from these issues can be treated and sometimes reversed with interventive conservation after the damage has occurred. However, many of the sources of danger mentioned above are controllable, and others are at least predictable. Disaster preparedness strives to mitigate the occurrence of damage and deterioration through risk management, research and the implementation of procedures which enhance the safety of cultural heritage objects and collections. Disaster preparedness is considered an integral part of collections maintenance, and collections management and is related to museum integrated pest management and museum environments.

Agents of deterioration are forces which act upon materials and cause them to change or deteriorate over time. There are commonly held to be ten main agents of deterioration. These are incorrect temperature, incorrect relative humidity, light, dust & pollutants (also called contaminants), pests, physical forces, theft & vandalism, fire, water, and dissociation or custodial neglect. It is important to recognize the type of damage each agent may present as well as ways to mitigate harmful effects.

Most of these forces can vary in intensity and severity. For example, earthquakes are a type of physical force that can cause widespread and severe damage to cultural heritage. A handling accident, where a single item is dropped and damaged, is also an example of physical forces but may not be considered a 'disaster' in the context of disaster planning as the incident likely can be dealt with as part of regular day-to-day business. Events considered 'disasters' in the context of disaster preparedness tend to be sudden or acute incidents with widespread and disruptive effects (such as natural disasters), which require a substantial redirection of resourcing from a normal business. The type of events included in an organisations disaster preparedness plan will depend on their risk appetite. Examples of disasters affecting cultural organisations and cultural heritage are given below using the 'agents of deterioration' category headings.

Natural disasters are usually dictated by region and climate. They may be predictable to a degree (in that some geographic locations are known to be more prone to earthquakes, hurricanes etc.) but the exact timing and intensity of natural disasters is uncertain. Examples of natural disasters include hurricanes, tornados, floods, blizzards, landslides, earthquakes and their aftershocks, bushfires or wildfires, and sandstorms or dust storms. These types of hazards can cause extreme structural and object damage to museums and cultural heritage sites. Many such disasters have resulted in loss of life and livelihoods in addition to loss or damage to cultural heritage. Some types of natural disasters are becoming more likely and more severe due to anthropogenic climate change, placing many cultural heritage sites at greater risk.

=== Temperature ===
Heatwaves are becoming more common and more extreme in many areas of the world due to the effects of anthropogenic climate change. As temperature is a major factor in the rate of chemical deterioration, higher average temperatures and fluctuations will cause cultural heritage to deteriorate at a faster rate. Biological deterioration from insects, mould (or mold) and micro-organisms may also occur more quickly as they thrive in higher temperatures. Cultural heritage 'disasters' relating to extreme heat are typically those associated with fire, though extreme high temperatures can cause structural damage, desiccation of textiles, embrittlement of paint layers, and softening and melting of adhesives and plastics. Change in weather conditions may also cause low temperatures which can cause stiffening and embrittlement to collection items.

=== Incorrect Relative Humidity ===
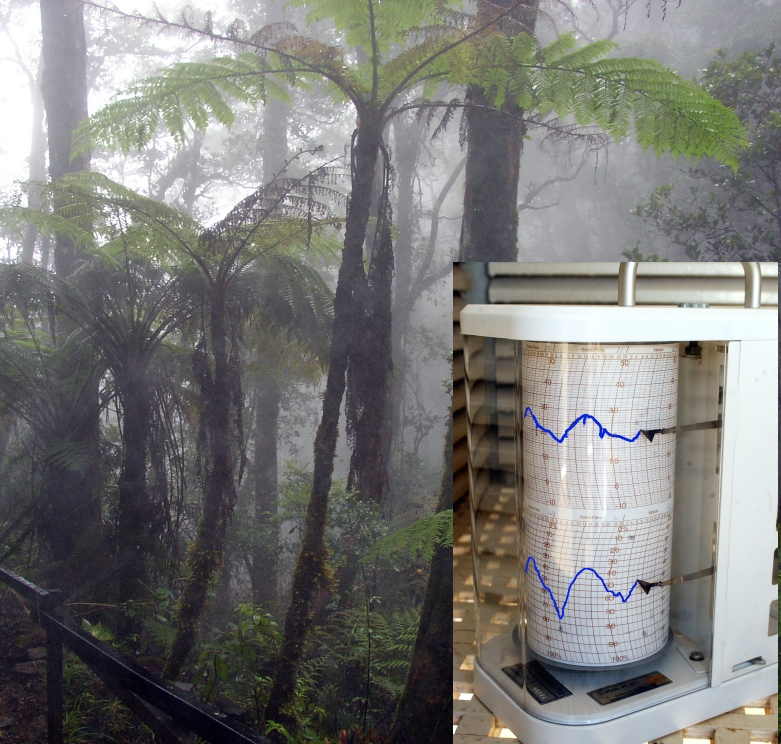
A cloud forest and a hygrometer

Relative Humidity (RH) can cause damage to cultural heritage when it is too high, too low or fluctuates to widely or frequently for specific materials. On its own it is not typically a cause of 'disasters', though high humidity is a major factor in mould (or mold) outbreaks. Mould (or mold) outbreaks are more often associated with flooding or water leaks, causing temporary increases in the moisture content of the air; however mould (or mold) caused by high humidity is an ongoing concern for cultural heritage in tropical climates.

=== Contamination or pollutants ===
Dust storms and excessive dust deposition due to building works or building collapse have caused damage to cultural heritage.

=== Physical forces ===
Physical forces that may result in collection disasters include earthquakes, structural collapse of buildings, and damage caused by civil unrest and war. Cultural heritage may be deliberately targeted during wartime due to their symbolic value.

There are many high-profile examples of loss caused by such events. As well as the devastating injuries and loss of life, the destruction of the World Trade Centre building in New York on 11 September 2001 resulted in the destruction of civic, business and non-profit archives, and library, archaeological and art collections. As examples, the Broadway Theatre Archive of 35,000 photographs was lost, as was one of the largest existing urban archaeological assemblages, that of the Five Points area in nineteenth century New York. These losses are detailed in the 2002 report by the Heritage Emergency National Task Force (HENTF), Cataclysm and Challenge: Impact of September 11, 2001, on Our Nation's Cultural Heritage.

In 2001 two six-century Bamiyan Buddha sculptures in Afghanistan were destroyed in an explosion set by Taliban forces.

Though cultural damage is usually dwarfed by loss of life and humanitarian effects, examples of major earthquakes causing loss of historic buildings and moveable heritage include the 2013 Bohol, Philippines earthquake, the 2016 earthquake in Italy, and the earthquakes of 2010 and 2011 in Christchurch, New Zealand. Many churches were damaged or destroyed in these earthquakes, including paintings, frescoes, furniture, manuscripts, and stained glass windows contained within. The 2015 earthquake in Nepal caused extensive damage to museums, temples, monasteries, libraries, and historic houses. Traditional craft practices were also disrupted by the quakes.

=== Fire ===
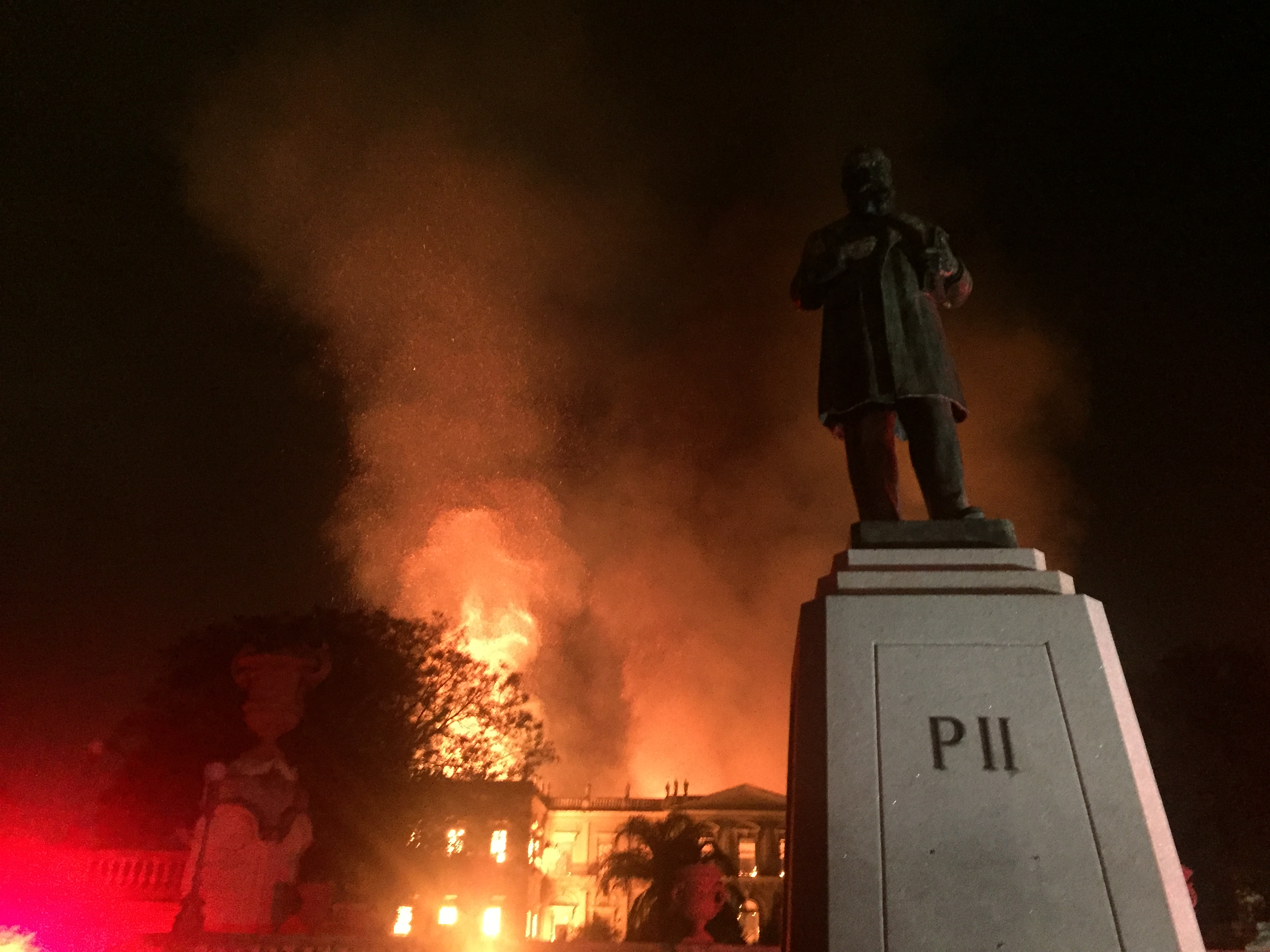
The National Museum of Brazil fire in September 2018

There are many examples of fire damaging cultural heritage. Fire can cause internal and external damage to singular exhibits or of whole building depending on the cause and speed of responsiveness.

The National Museum of Brazil was destroyed by a fire in 2018. In 1992 a fire broke out at Windsor Castle, damaging several rooms and associated furnishings. The Notre Dame Cathedral in Paris suffered a devastating fire in April 2019 that damaged priceless artefacts and the magnificent roof structure.

=== Water ===
Flooding in locations that experience extreme weather conditions (rainfall, storms) is one relatively common type of disaster affecting cultural collections. Extreme weather events are also becoming more common due to the effects of anthropogenic climate change. Water damage may also occur due to storm surges in coastal areas, and rising sea levels. Disasters have also been caused by faulty pipe or sprinkler systems, and the improper use of water during cleaning.

The 1966 Florence Floods were a pivotal moment in the development of the conservation profession.

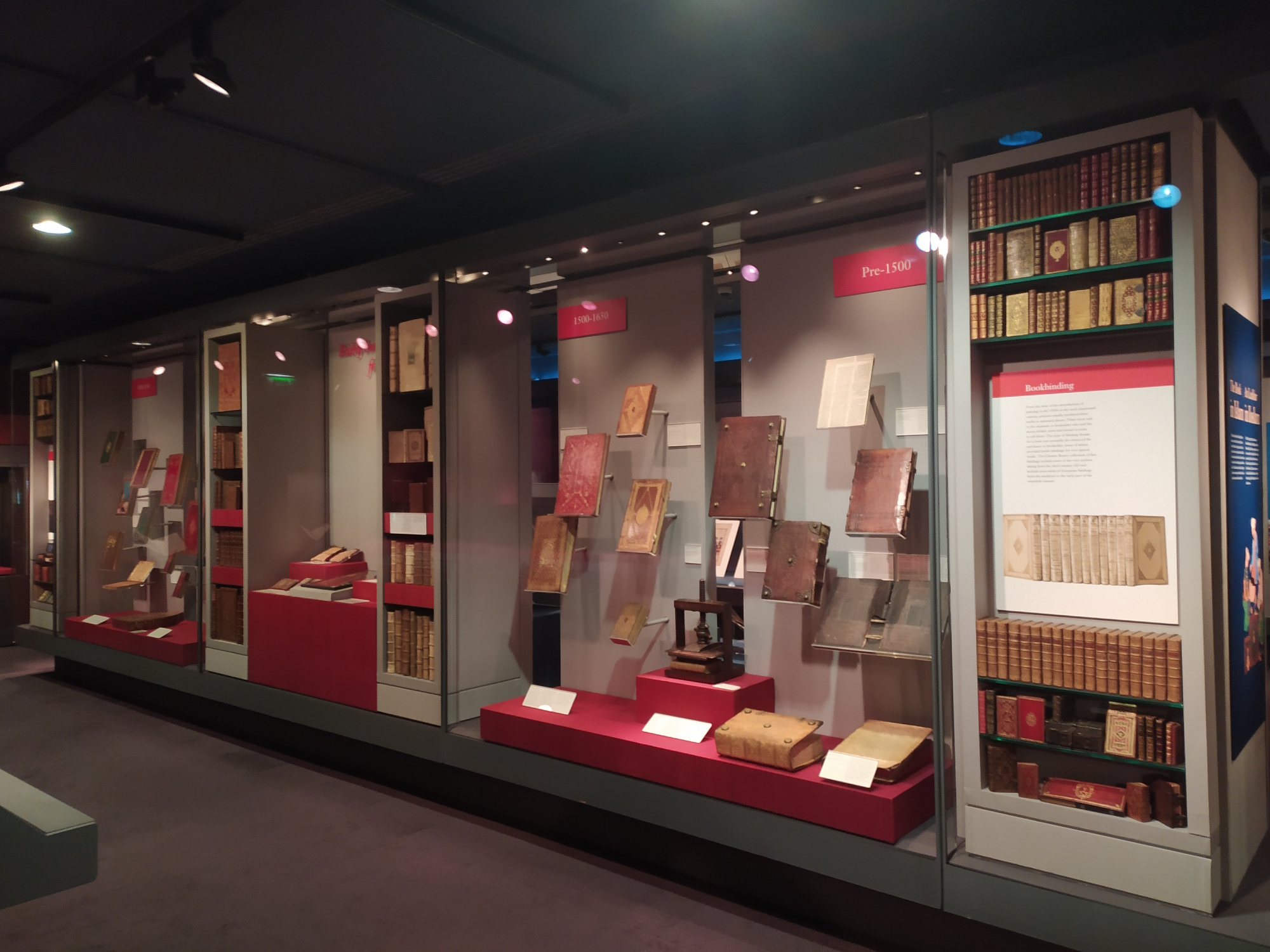
Secured display cabinets at Chester Beatty Library

=== Theft and vandalism ===
Theft and vandalism may be planned acts or opportunistic. There have been many high-profile cases of planned thefts from cultural organisations worldwide, though not all such events come to public notice; other thefts have occurred when normal security controls are interrupted, such as during building works, civil protests, or even during acts of terrorism and war.

=== Dissociation ===
Extreme forms of dissociation (separation of the physical item from the information that makes it significant) might include a critical loss of electronic data that cannot be retrieved, or the closure or sale of the collection (in parts or in its entirety) due to financial or political pressures.

=== Other risks ===
Not all risks to collections can be categorised according to the agents of deterioration. They may not result in direct damage or loss to collection material but instead affect the reputation or operation of the organisation. For example, serious issues can be created due to funding or sponsorship scandals; misuse of funds; the presence of looted cultural property or material acquired by unethical means; political or social perspectives on activities undertaken by the governing body, a donor, or even the institution's founder; and wider societal economic pressures leading to the closure of collecting organisations due to loss of income.

Political, business, social, religious or media pressure groups may in some cases interfere with the operation of cultural organisations, leading to selection bias, propaganda, discrimination or censorship attempts (e.g. in the presentation of exhibitions, or in recruitment processes).

== Disaster preparedness plan ==
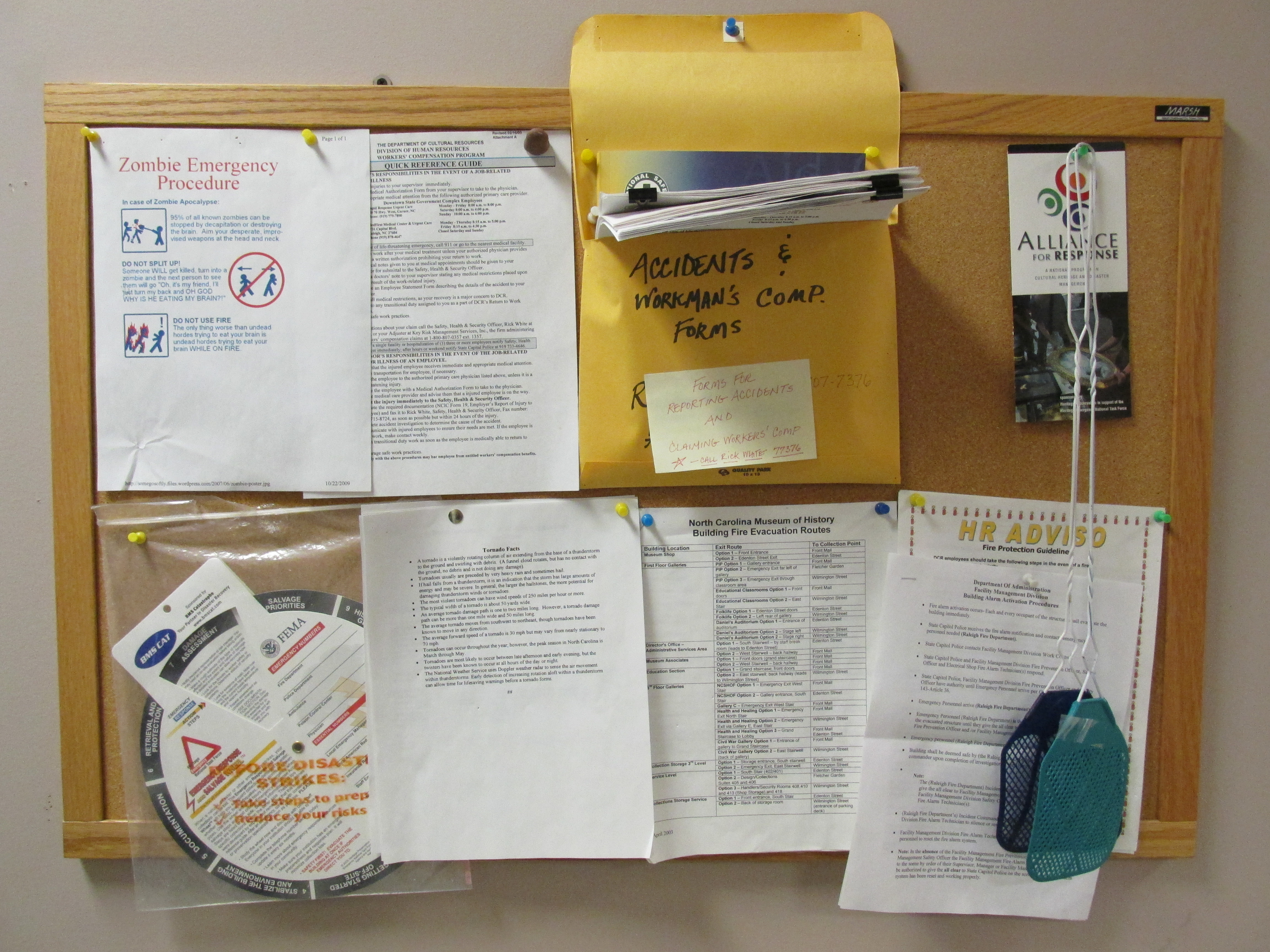
Office board with emergency planning, response, and salvage documents

Museums develop disaster (or emergency) preparedness plans for natural and man-made events that may be expected to occur. These plans are collection-focussed and separate to or a sub-component of wider organisational operational risk management plans, which focus on human safety and business continuity (including procedures related to crisis management and crisis communication in order to protect the institution's reputation in case of a public relations crisis). Despite their focus on cultural heritage, collection disaster preparedness plans still emphasise the need to put human safety above collection safety.

Various contingency plans should also be included.

The primary objectives of emergency planning are to identify risks in order to anticipate and, if possible, to avoid emergencies; to retain control when an emergency occurs; and to mitigate potential damage as quickly as possible. Disaster preparedness plans are usually created and reviewed in consultation with various stakeholders. Copies of disaster preparedness plan are kept in different locations within and outside of the museum, in case the emergency situation prevents access to the museum site. Training is an important part of a disaster preparedness plan, to ensure that staff are familiar with the contents of the plan and understand how to effectively carry out the established protocols.

A variety of templates and guides have been published to assist cultural organisations prepare for disasters:

- Building an emergency plan, published by the Getty Conservation Institute in the US
- Be prepared, published by the Heritage Collections Council in Australia and made available via the Australian Institute for the Conservation of Cultural Materials
- dPlan, hosted by the North East Document Conservation Centre (NEDCC)
- The Emergency Preparedness and Response wiki, prepared by the American Institute for Conservation and including the Emergency Response and Salvage Wheel. The Wheel was previously available as an iPhone app but as of 2021 requires updating from 32-bit format.
- Resources from ICCROM's FAR programme : First Aid and Resilience for Cultural Heritage in Times of Crisis (FAR)

=== Preparation ===
To prepare for disasters, cultural organisations may conduct regular risk assessments to identify potential dangers to the collection or related organisational activities. This assessment is used to prepare both preventive maintenance programs (to prevent disasters from occurring) and response plans for identified scenarios. Other preparatory activities include creating and maintaining an inventory of the collection, identifying salvage priorities for different disaster scenarios, developing emergency telephone contact lists, identifying critical resources and contractors, and assembling useful disaster salvage equipment and supplies (e.g. spill kits, wet-dry vacuum cleaners, fans). Training for museum personnel is another key part of the preparation stage. Cultural organizations may also consider setting up a mobile laboratory such as the heritage ambulance set up by IAPH in Seville.

==== Insurance ====
A detailed and flexible insurance policy is a useful preparation strategy. A policy may specify the replacement value of objects owned by the museum and those loaned by other organisations, and cover building repairs, temporary offsite storage, clean-up operations and other costs incurred.

=== Prevention ===
Emergency preparedness should dovetail collections maintenance and preservation activities. Although many preventive measures are universal, certain measures are particularly useful in mitigating against collection disasters.

==== Preventive maintenance ====
A variety of teams within a cultural organisation contribute to its upkeep and maintenance.

Facilities management ensure gas, sewage, electricity and water services are well-maintained and compliant with local codes. They maintain any fire doors, fire detection and suppression systems and check the building regularly for fire risks. Emergency access routes are signposted and cleared of obstacles.

Collection management teams ensure items are stored in a manner to prevent water, dust and pest ingress. Storage enclosures and furniture keeps collection objects at least 10 cm above the floor to reduce the risk from floodwaters.

==== Environmental monitoring ====
Regular monitoring of the temperature and relative humidity in collection spaces (storage and display) helps identify new trends or unusual occurrences - for example, if a sudden increase in relative humidity is detected early enough, it may be possible to correct the environment before mould growth occurs.

==== Security measures ====
Physical security systems deter potential intruders (e.g. warning signs, security lighting and perimeter markings), detect intrusions and monitor/record intruders (e.g. intruder alarms and CCTV systems) and trigger appropriate incident responses (e.g. by security guards and police).

==== Resources and personnel ====
Preparedness for personnel includes providing museum staff with emergency training and predetermined designated responsibilities. Training may take the form of 'desktop' walkthroughs of scenarios, quizzes, and hands-on salvage practice.

==== Policies and procedures ====
In an attempt to maintain control of any emergency, the policies and procedures in the emergency plan outline the chain of command, prescribed team roles and responsibilities, documentation requirements, and salvage priorities.

==== Plan review and revision ====
Periodically, museums will reevaluate their disaster preparedness plan to account for changes in contact numbers, locations or personnel, revised salvage priority lists, and other modifications impacting the institution's prevention, mitigation and preparedness strategy.

=== Response ===
Immediate action taken within the first few hours or days to stabilize the environment, assess the damage, and report conditions and recommendations may be considered the 'response' phase of the disaster. Contingency and communication strategies in the disaster preparedness plan are put into action.

The welfare of staff and visitors is the primary concern during an emergency, and their safety must be ensured first and foremost. The best response is executed by following the prescribed emergency response plan, remaining safe and calm, and acting deliberately. Risk assessments are recommended to identify hazards to health and safety and to implement controls before recovery salvage work begins. For example, damaged structures may need to be stabilised before it is safe for salvage teams to enter. Collections and facilities may be contaminated with sewage, toxic chemicals or other hazardous substances. There may be electrical risks from damaged or exposed wiring. Salvage teams will also need safe, dry and warm rest areas and toilet facilities.

Response activities may include:

- Liaising with first responders, such as fire
- Contacting the organisation's insurance company and agents with any available information and photographs of the incident.
- Contacting organizations or private lenders with loaned items in affected spaces.
- Contacting museum emergency response teams to notify them to be on standby (if not required immediately).
- Contacting pre-approved engineers, disaster response and salvage organizations, and other service providers, to make them aware of the incident and potential requests for assistance (e.g. for transport, generators, new or interim security controls, drying systems (fans/air pumps), clean water, and freezer services).
- Preparing and releasing a press release via a media liaison.
- Rescheduling any tour groups or other appointments.

==== Documentation ====
Documentation of the incident and any damage caused before commencing salvage activities is an important part of the response stage. This helps with planning, reduces recovery time, and provides a record for insurance purposes and other reporting. Photographs showing where dislodged objects have fallen can help to identify them later, based on their location. Documentation may need to be carried out under supervision of emergency services personnel, especially if the building is damaged or unstable.

The disaster response team can use the information collected to discuss the next steps. These may include establishing salvage work areas, establishing personal protective equipment and hazardous substances mitigation requirements, recommendations for additional security controls, and triage protocols for salvage treatments.

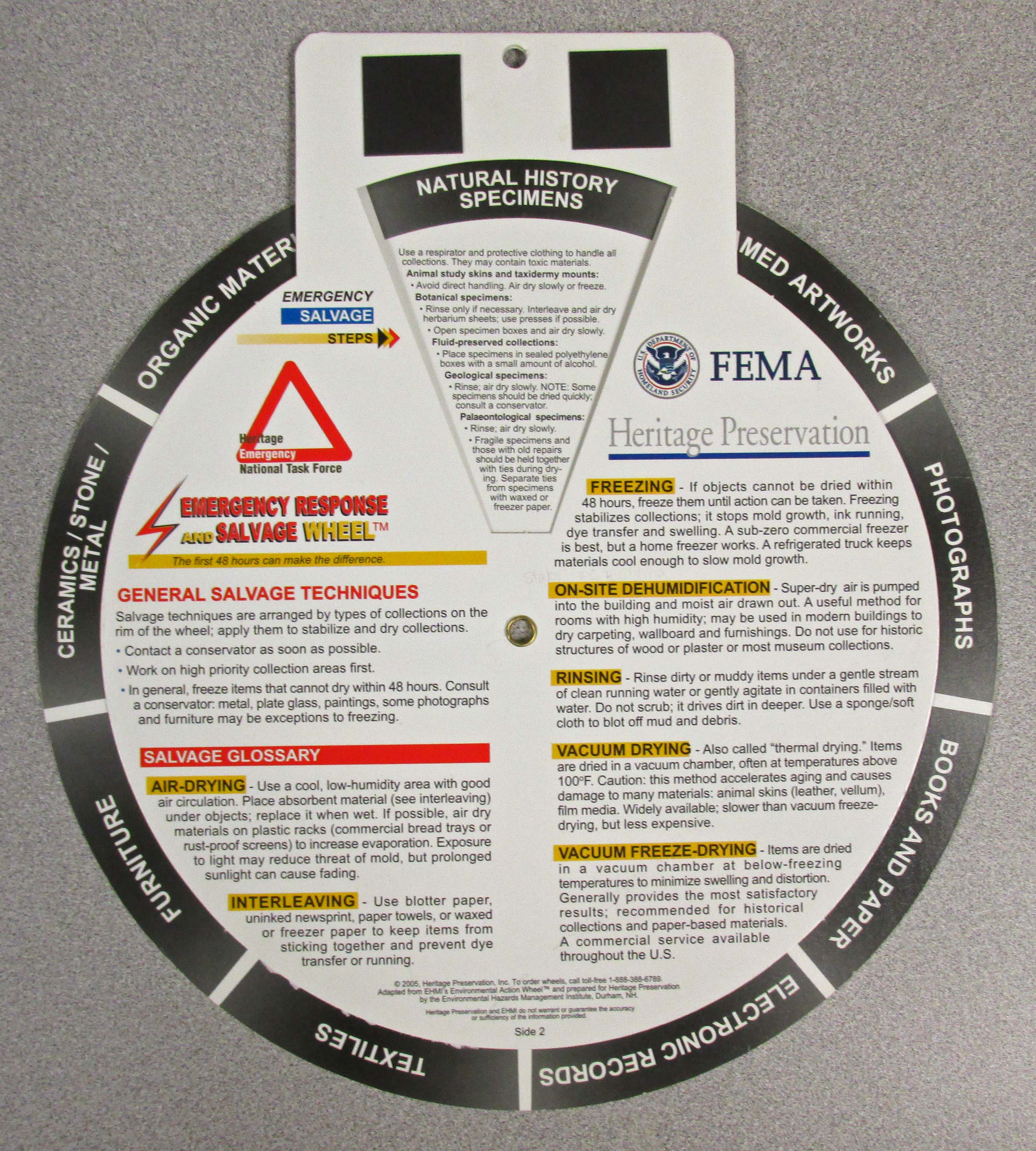
Emergency Response and Salvage Wheel nine categories of collections by material. Step by step!

=== Recovery ===
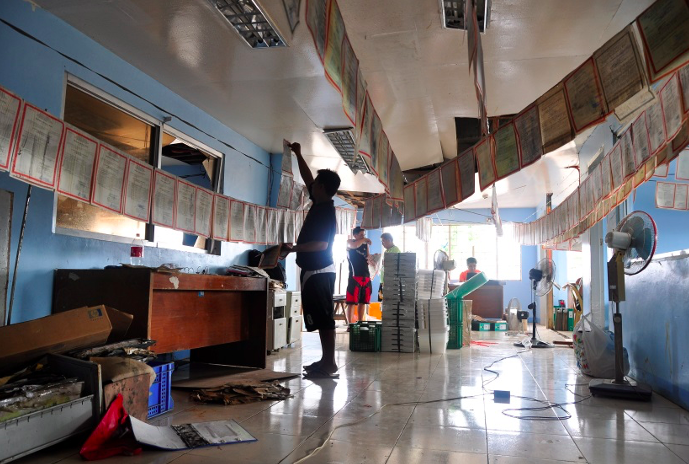
Water-damaged records are air-dried through hanging at the Land Registration Authority (Leyte, Philippines). Photo taken during the Society of Filipino Archivists' Assessment and Technical Assistance to records offices affected by Super Typhoon Haiyan (Yolanda), 2013.

The recovery phase begins when the disaster situation is brought under control and work to retrieve and treat damaged collection objects can begin. Plans developed during the response phase are put into action, and regularly reviewed and revised for as long as salvage operations continue.

Salvage activities are more effective if salvage priorities are established prior to the commencement of recovery activities, even before a disaster has even occurred. Priority salvage lists are a common component of disaster preparedness plans. Cultural organisations may prioritise objects based on their value, their vulnerability, and their prospects for recovery (triage).

There are many online resources that specify how to stabilize and care for various object formats that have been damaged by material and condition. Activities may include protecting undamaged objects with plastic sheeting, packing damaged objects to move offsite (e.g. to a freezer, if they have become wet), isolating items that have become mouldy, retrieving broken pieces that have become detached, setting up fans to dry objects that have become wet.

Building recovery may occur concurrently by Facilities, Security, and other custodial departments.

The health and safety of staff, visitors and emergency personal remain the highest priority.

==== Funding recovery efforts ====
Many disaster recovery activities are limited by a lack of available resources and funding. Strategies to raise funds have included approaches to existing donors, 'adopt an artefact' campaigns where groups or individuals sponsor the conservation of damaged objects or exhibits, and fundraising events. Social media has increasingly played a major role in fundraising and mobilizing recovery efforts.

Raising climate finance or green climate fund to combat the impacts to culture and communities, as result of climate calamities, is on the agenda for COP27.

== See also ==
- Risk management
- Collections management
- Collections in museums
- Conservation and restoration of movable cultural property
- Conservator-restorer
- Preservation of library and archive materials
- Digital preservation
- Integrated pest management
- Disaster recovery
- Disaster response
- Emergency management
