= List of cultural conservation and restoration organizations =

The following is a list of organizations associated with the professional field of conservation-restoration.

Professional conservators join and take part in the activities of numerous conservation associations and professional organizations with the wider conservation field, and within their area of specialization.

These organizations exist to "support the conservation professionals who preserve our cultural heritage". This involves upholding professional standards, promoting research and publications, providing educational opportunities, and fostering the exchange of knowledge among conservators, allied professionals, and the public.

- American Institute for Conservation
- Australian Institute for the Conservation of Cultural Materials
- Digital Preservation Coalition
- European Confederation of Conservator-Restorers' Organisations
- Institute of Conservation
- International Institute for Conservation
- Intermuseum Conservation Association
- Midwest Regional Conservation Guild
- Society for the Protection of Ancient Buildings
- Western Association for Art Conservation
- Wyoming Outdoor Council
