= Midwest Regional Conservation Guild =

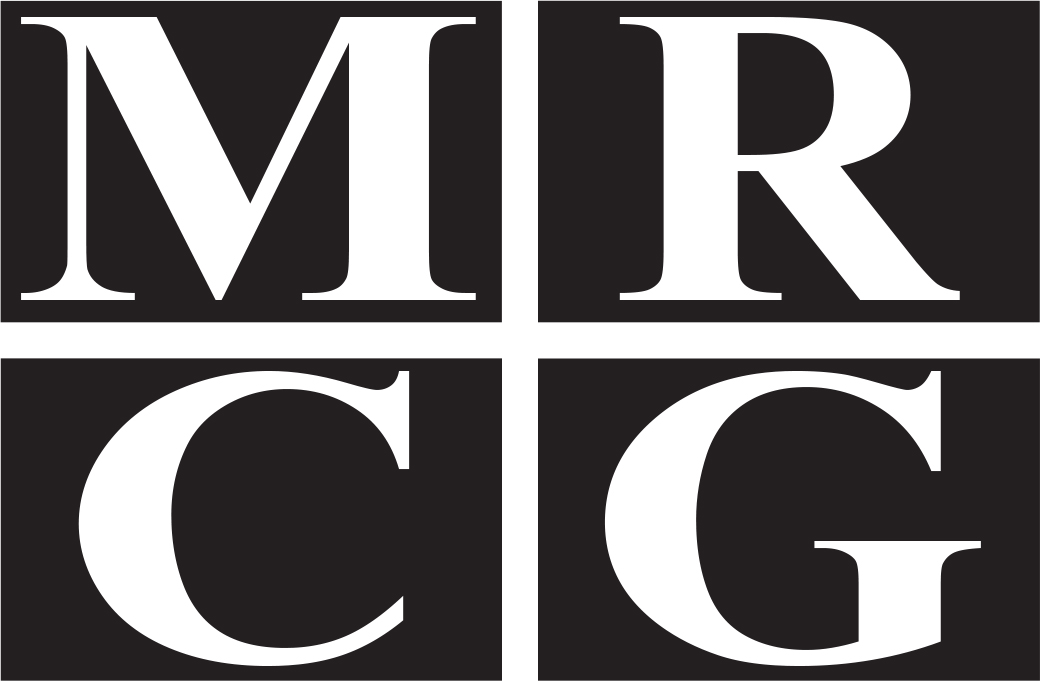
- Predecessor: Indianapolis Museum of Art and Cleveland Museum of Art
- Established: 1980
- Type: Professional conservation association
- Region served: Midwestern United States
- Members: over 100
- Website: www.midwestconservation.org

The Midwest Regional Conservation Guild (MRCG) is a professional conservation association in the Midwestern United States.

== History ==
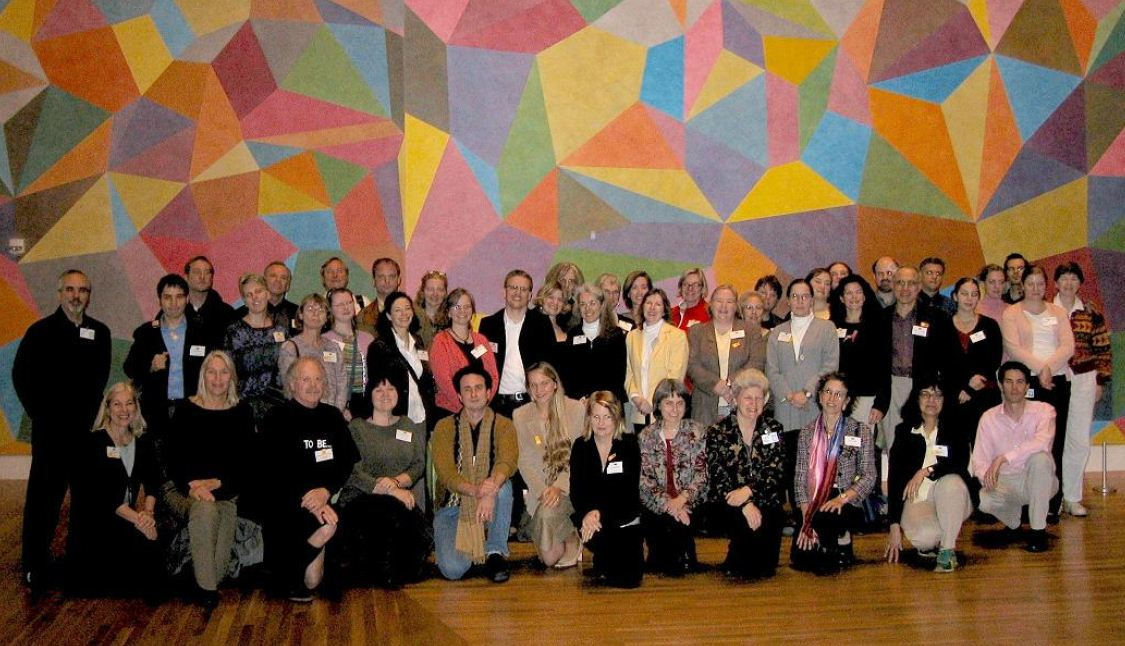
Members of the MRCG attending the 25th Annual Meeting in 2005 at the IMA

The MRCG was formed in 1980 by art conservation and restoration professionals with the purpose of bringing together those individuals in the Midwest region (and beyond) interested in the preservation of historic and artistic works and to promote fellowship and exchange of ideas on a professional level.

The first meeting of the Guild was held at the Indianapolis Museum of Art (IMA) on Saturday, October 25, 1980. Art conservation experts specializing in archive, painting, paper, object, and textile conservation from Indiana, Illinois, Michigan, and Ohio met that day to discuss conservation treatment issues, conservation techniques, and the "formation of an information network and cooperative disaster policy for the Midwest." (IMA) paintings conservator David Miller was the Guild's first president and presided over the first meeting of approximately 40 participants. The program consisted of an organizational meeting, museum tours, and two slide presentations.

The Guild was organized in recognition of the pressing concerns of "museum curators and private collectors alike to preserve great works of art against the ravages of time and the environment, as well as to uncover increasingly sophisticated forgeries."

The original purpose and character of the guild was defined by six principles:

1. The Guild should provide a framework for knowing other conservators and laboratories in our region.
2. The Guild should provide informal exchange of ideas with our colleagues.
3. The Guild should serve as a "problem solving forum."
4. The Guild could accurately represent our needs to national level agencies.
5. Meetings could be held twice a year, rotating geographic location.

== Meeting locations ==
For more than 30 years, the Guild has had annual meetings throughout the Midwest region, often at area museums. There have been at least 49 annual meetings in 12 different states. The museums that have hosted the most meetings are:

Top museums that have hosted MRCG meetings
Name of museum	Number of meetings hosted
Nelson-Atkins Museum	3
Detroit Institute of Arts	3
Cincinnati Art Museum	4
Cleveland Museum of Art	6
Indianapolis Museum of Art	5

== Publications ==
Starting in 1981, the Midwest Regional Conservation Guild Newsletter has been published bi-annually, highlighting environmental news gathered around the Midwest.

In 1993, the MRCG began producing its Membership Directory, which appeared yearly until it became an online resource with updates every few months.

== Organisation and Governance ==
=== Current MRCG Officers ===
- President (2026): Garrett Sumner
- Vice President (2026): Julie Ribits
- Secretary (2026): Cuong Nguyen
- Treasurer (2026): Allison Slenker
- Newsletter Editor (2026): Ashlyn Oprescu

== See also ==
- Art conservation and restoration
- Conservation Associations and Professional Organizations
