= Intermuseum Conservation Association =

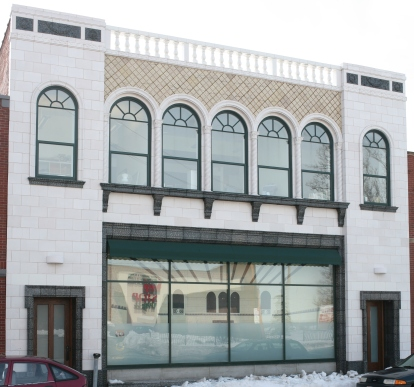
Vitrolite Building, Cleveland, OH

The Intermuseum Conservation Association (doing business as ICA-Art Conservation or ICA) is the oldest non-profit art conservation center in the United States, currently located in Cleveland, OH. The ICA offers conservation and preservation treatments for paintings, murals, works on paper, documents, objects of all media, outdoor sculpture, monuments, and textiles.

== History ==
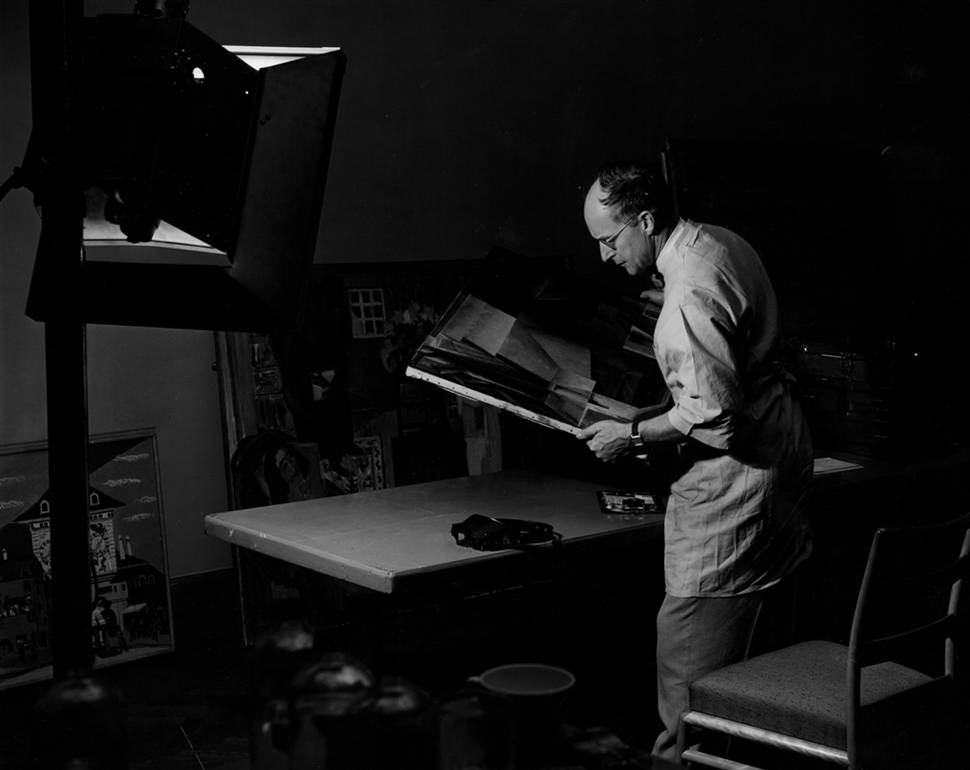
Richard Buck, founding ICA Director

The Intermuseum Conservation Association (ICA) was founded in 1952 on the campus of Oberlin College in Oberlin, OH. Six directors of major Midwestern museums wanted to create a professional art conservation laboratory. Richard Buck from the Harvard Art Department was the first director of the ICA and served for 20 years. In 2003, the ICA left Oberlin and moved to its current location on the Detroit Shoreway in Cleveland. The new building was once the headquarters of the Vitrolite Company, manufacturers of a popular opaque glass used in 1920s-1950s interior and exterior design. The Vitrolite Building is on the National Register of Historical Places. The ICA is currently restoring the last surviving Vitrolite glass-decorated showroom in the country, for use as an educational and public meeting space.

== Services ==
The ICA has an open 8000 square foot laboratory space for all four conservation specialties: objects, textiles, works on paper, and painting conservation. Beyond conserving and restoring pieces of art, the ICA offers educational programs for learners of all ages, disaster response services, fine art storage, insurance claim assistance, custom mounting and framing, and installation services.

== Member institutions (selection) ==
- Akron Art Museum
- Allen Memorial Art Museum
- Cleveland Clinic Foundation
- Cleveland Museum of Art
- Cleveland Public Library
- Kent State University Museum
- Maltz Museum of Jewish Heritage
- Progressive Art Collection
- Rock and Roll Hall of Fame and Museum
- Stan Hywet Hall and Gardens

== ICA projects (selection) ==
- Saul Steinberg’s mural of Cincinnati
- Carnegie Museum of Art’s Hall of Architecture
- Indiana State Museum’s 92 County Walk
- RagGonNon "Journeys" Quilt by Aminah Brenda Lyn Robinson at the National Underground Railroad Freedom Center
- Model Ship from Allen County Museum
- Joan Miró Mural from Cincinnati Art Museum
- Playhouse Square’s State Theater mural by James Daugherty
- William Sommer's and Ora Coltman's murals in the Cleveland Public Library
- Restoring and conserving multiple murals from the Federal Art Project in the region
- Stored a large portion of the Akron Art Museum’s collection during its renovation, doing conservation work on the sculpture "The Inverted Q"
