= Australian Institute for the Conservation of Cultural Materials =

The Australian Institute for the Conservation of Cultural Materials (AICCM) is Australia's national membership organisation for conservation professionals. Its members are mainly professional conservators, conservation students and cultural heritage member organisations in the Australian and Pacific region. It provides services for members and resources for the public and associated cultural heritage organisations and liaises with other professional associations including the Australian Library and Information Association (ALIA), the Australian Society of Archivists and Australian Museums and Galleries Association.

AICCM has seven state and territory divisions.

== History ==
The Institute for the Conservation of Cultural Materials (ICCM) formed in 1973. At that stage it was anticipated the ICCM would at some point merge with the International Institute for the Conservation of Historic and Artistic Works (IIC), but the ICCM became an incorporated Australian Association in 1978. The AICCM Bulletin was first published 1975, out of the Australian National University (ANU). A Code of Ethics and Code of Practice were first proposed in 1982 and adopted in 1987. In 1987 the ICCM also formally changed its name to the Australian Institute for the Conservation of Cultural Materials (AICCM). For many years based in Canberra, ACT, since 2004 the AICCM has maintained a web-based Secretariat service and online member services.

Throughout its history, the AICCM has maintained close ties to tertiary conservation training programs in Australia, including the various conservation courses at the University of Canberra and the Grimwade Centre at the University of Melbourne.

== Description ==
The AICCM has seven state and territory divisions (Australian Capital Territory, Queensland, New South Wales, South Australia & Northern Territory, Tasmania, Victoria, and Western Australia) and 12 active special interest groups (Book & Paper, Conservation Framers, Conservation Science, Electron, Emerging Conservators, Exhibition Conservation, Gilded Objects, Objects, Paintings, PHOTON, Preventive Conservation, and Textiles). The national AICCM, state divisions and groups are led by elected volunteer positions.

== Activities ==
=== Gatherings ===
Structured gatherings include biennial national conferences and special interest group conferences. In addition, topical seminars, short talks, workshops, and social gatherings are often organised on the state division or special interest group level.

=== Resources ===
The AICCM operates by a Code of Ethics and Practice, a professional code which keeps members accountable and acts as a guide to help ensure a high professional standard.

The AICCM website contains a variety of resources on collection care and conservation. Presently, an online wiki is under development by members, beginning with the topic 'Sustainable Collections' covering sustainability in conservation and related practice.

=== Publications ===
The Bulletin is the AICCM's peer-reviewed journal. Since 2015 it has been produced in partnership with academic publishers Taylor and Francis. The National Newsletter is currently published five times per year, in electronic form only. The AICCM has also produced preprints of papers presented at national conferences and special interest group meetings.

The AICCM contributed to a number of publications aimed at assisting small museums and galleries, and funded by the now defunct Heritage Collections Council (HCC): reCollections (2000), Be Prepared (2000), and Guidelines for Environmental Control of Cultural Institutions (2002).

== AICCM Environmental Guidelines for Australian Cultural Heritage Collections ==
The AICCM has released a set of environmental guidelines in response to the IIC and ICOM-CC 2014 Declaration on Environmental Guidelines. These guidelines are driven by three guiding principles:

- Sustainability and resilience
- Adaptive and proactive practices
- Maintaining relevance

These guidelines are to ensure that the environmental conditions are suited for the local climate with a goal of mitigating climate change through these passive and low-energy solutions.

== Professional membership ==
AICCM has a voluntary professional membership category. Professional members can use the post-nominal letters PMAICCM (Professional Member, Australian Institute for the Conservation of Cultural Materials).

== See also ==
- Conservation-restoration of cultural heritage
- Cultural heritage
- List of dates in the history of conservation and restoration
- Conservation associations and professional organisations
