= Museum environments =

Environmental factors in museology

Museum environment issues include temperature, humidity, light, atmospheric pollutants, and dust, which are typically controlled in buildings that contain collections of cultural and scientific significance. These environmental factors are all 'agents of deterioration' that cause damage to objects, as they play a role in deterioration pathways such as oxidation, hydrolysis, cross-linking and chain scission.

Conservators, collection managers and facility managers often work together to control the environments in which cultural heritage is stored, transported, and displayed. As the conservation-restoration profession has developed, various environmental recommendations or guidelines have emerged. The temperature and relative humidity range considered acceptable in any one cultural organisation may vary according to the type of building, the presence and type of air conditioning systems, and the types of collection material present. Many collecting organisations will also expect these conditions to be maintained during transport and when collection objects are on loan to other organisations (as part of a loan agreement).

Published environmental guidelines for museums tend to minimise both extremes and fluctuations of temperature and relative humidity. Increasingly, the benefits of environmental controls for museum collections are balanced against the energy and environmental costs of maintaining relatively tight parameters. Published guidelines now also take a more holistic approach by taking local conditions into account – e.g., that it may not be possible or appropriate for a museum located in the tropics to maintain an environment more typical of temperate regions.

== Sustainable energy use ==
=== Heritage machinery ===
Maintaining and displaying the functional capability of a mechanical heritage object enables audiences to immerse themselves in the sensory experience of the display, which imparts information about scientific and technological advances and allows people to make personal connections with the machines. Operating heritage machinery also helps to keep physical components in good condition, and provides opportunities for preserving and passing on the customs and knowledge held by communities of practice who work with heritage machines. Much of this is tacit and embodied knowledge that, like riding a bicycle, has to be learnt through physical experience and practice.

Heritage machines mostly run on fossil fuels, though, which means that they rely on environmentally damaging extraction processes, emit greenhouse gases (and other pollutants), and usually leak lubricating oils. This raises the ethical question of whether operating these machines is important enough to justify their environmental impacts, and the practical question of whether the fossil fuels and lubricants they require will continue to be available/affordable for the heritage sector as the extraction, refining and distribution of these materials is reduced and/or eliminated.

Through the development of sustainability policies, heritage machinery collections can employ strategies to ensure that these cultural heritage objects continue to get exposure for generations to come.

==== Strategies for sustainability policies ====
===== Offset emission =====
While the emissions from heritage machines are unavoidable, carbon offsetting is a strategy that counteracts the environmental impact of running the machine as a functional display. Such offsetting strategies include:

- Carbon credit purchases: in which cash is exchanged for carbon credits, with each credit equating to one metric tonne of carbon dioxide (CO_{2}) equivalent that has been stored or avoided by a project. In Australia, Climate Active provides guidelines and minimum standards for calculating and auditing offsets.
- Community partnership projects, in which the institution or collection runs or participates in greenhouse gas abatement activities or projects which are eligible for the issue of carbon credits. An example of such a project is the Sustainable Destination Partnership, in which the Australian Museum is a founding member.
- Museum environment emission reduction: Is achievable through making changes to the building envelope; such as the use of rainwater tanks, solar panels, grey water tanks, closed loop hydraulic or air pressure systems or planting trees for passive climate control.
- Emissions sold as a product: in which there is a direct capture of CO_{2} (DAC) from the site of emission to be resold and recycled into chemicals or fuel. For further reading on the economic viability of CO_{2} emission sale, see the Columbia University 2021 report.

===== Run sustainable =====
In situations where it is socially, economically and ethically viable to reduce or negate emissions, the following strategies may apply:

- Make a replica: The production of a replica, as either a static cut-away display or as a dynamic machine run on cleaner energy, can demonstrate the mechanical principles of the heritage machine; thus reducing the need to run the original heritage object.
- Leave as static exhibit: By reducing or stopping altogether the machines running time, the cost of maintenance and energy is saved, while the machine can remain in-situ unmodified for the enjoyment of future generations. However, this action requires careful consideration for while all fluids can be drained by the machine for a clean display, some machines will seize without regular lubrication, with a seized machine risking non-functionality in future situations.
- Modify exhibit setup: Some machines can be turned into closed-loop systems which can reduce the running wastage and resource cost. However, careful consideration must be undertaken as heritage machines were not designed to function in a close loop and such a setup can risk voiding warranties and increasing maintenance costs due to fouling and corrosion.
- Modify heritage object: This is by far the most drastic strategy, for while machines are adapted or changed to meet functional requirements during their working lives, the intentional modification of heritage objects runs the risk of violating a heritage institution's and or a conservator's code of ethics and best practices. However, without modifications to reduce emissions or resource consumption, some machines may lose their cultural relevance through lack of awareness, appreciation and respect born out of an audience's lack of exposure

===== Relocation and collaboration =====
- Transfer stewardship: through a loan or Memorandum of understanding with an appropriate Special Interest Group (SIG) or association, with the understanding that the item will be returned and or re-donated to the museum after a specific time period.
  - In exchange for transferring stewardship and cost to public organizations and private collections, a museum can commit to providing advice and or training on significance assessments, fund sourcing, conservation & restoration practices & technical skills to maintain object, thus counteracting shortfalls in the Industrial Heritage's volunteer sector
- Decommission & document: Create a digital archive of associated machinery information, photographs, schematics, oral history recordings, rather than preserving physical objects.

International Special Interest Groups (SIG) for Heritage Machinery conservation
Name
The International Committee for the Conservation of the Industrial Heritage (TICCIH)
Big Stuff Heritage
Scottish Transport & Industry Collections Knowledge Network (STICK)

== Museum environments – early examples ==
During the first half of the twentieth century, many organisations and individuals noted parallels between temperature, relative humidity (RH) and the condition of objects in museum collections. Gradually, relative humidity levels between 50% and 60% became preferred, for example after observing that paintings and other collection items from Britain's National Gallery showed no further damage while stored in environmentally stable caves (58% RH) during World War II but began to crack and flake when returned to the National Gallery in London, which did not have air conditioning until 1949. Hence, when air conditioning was introduced, 58% RH was chosen as the target value. A survey conducted by Harold Plenderleith in 1960 found that most museums aimed for or experienced RH values between 50 and 60%.

The Arrhenius equation, first published in 1889, has also been influential in the development of museum environmental recommendations. Broadly, the equation shows that for every 10 °C increase in temperature, the rate of chemical reactions will double.

== The Museum Environment ==
Garry Thomson's 1978 publication The Museum Environment was a major influence in the development of environmental guidelines for cultural organisations and the field of preventive conservation. Though critical analysis shows that Thompson did not intend for his recommended parameters for temperature and relative humidity to become 'rules', nevertheless over the subsequent decade 50% ±5 RH and 21 °C / 70 °F ±2 became the default and preferred parameters for the international community. They became a particularly convenient standard for loan agreements.

== Material-specific recommendations ==
Research in the 1990s and 2000s lead towards more nuanced environmental recommendations for different classes of objects and materials, based on their sensitivities. There was greater consideration of both the chemical and mechanical effects of temperature and RH.

In 1993 the Image Permanence Institute released The IPI Storage Guide for Acetate Film, written by James Reilly. Based on accelerated ageing tests, this resource showed how lowering the temperature and RH could prolong the useful life of cellulose acetate film.

In the mid-1990s, researchers at the Conservation Analytical Lab of the Smithsonian Institution conducted research to characterise the response of wood, canvas paintings, acrylic paints, photographic emulsions and paper to fluctuations in RH, leading to more specific recommendations for allowable RH fluctuations. For example, their research found that oil and acrylic paints were susceptible to cold temperatures but little affected by RH. However, other elements in 'layered' objects such as paintings may be vulnerable to RH change, such as gesso ground layers underneath the paint, or wooden or canvas substrates. This research also drew attention to the energy costs of tight environmental controls.

Researchers at the Canadian Conservation Institute (CCI) also developed more nuanced guidelines for temperature and RH, categorising materials as low, medium or highly sensitive to specified parameters and specifying critical levels beyond which chemical, biological or physical change would occur. For example, at 50% RH and 20 °C a chemically stable format like black and white photographic negatives on glass is expected to have a useful life of about 300 years, compared to 1500 years at 10% RH and 20 °C. In comparison, chemically unstable materials like magnetic media formats (audio and video cassettes) are expected to have between 10 and 50 years at 50% and 10% RH respectively. A moderately sensitive material might last 150 years in a warm room (25 °C) but 6,000 years at 0 °C. Waxy materials soften above 30°C (an issue for wax-lined paintings); many plastics distort above 60 °C (PET, acrylic, Nylon, ABS). Conversely, below 5 °C many paint materials enter a glassy phase that makes them more susceptible to physical damage.

== Bizot Green Protocol ==
In 2015 the Bizot Group, also known as the International Group of Organizers of Large-Scale Exhibitions, released the Bizot Green Protocol, shifting museum environment recommendations towards mutual understandings between borrowers and lenders and factoring in more specific requirements of different categories of objects. The Green Protocol also recognised the environmental 'history' of collection objects, in that they may have experienced very different environmental conditions before they became part of a museum collection. In general, the Green Protocol called for wider parameters than those taken from Thomson's work, suggesting a range of 40-60% relative humidity and a stable temperature in the range 16-25 °C with fluctuations of no more than ±10% RH per 24 hours.g.

== ICOM-CC and IIC joint statement ==
In 2014 the International Council of Museums Conservation Committee (ICOM-CC) and the International Institute for Conservation (IIC) released a joint statement calling for sustainability and climate change to be integral considerations within museum environmental guidelines, while acknowledging the complexity of the science and relationships involved. The declaration called for transparency in loan agreements, in terms of what environmental controls are achievable and reasonable, especially when most museums worldwide do not have mechanical climate control systems.

== AICCM ==
In 2018, the Australian Institute for the Conservation of Cultural Materials ratified new environmental guidelines for cultural collections and endorsed the Heritage Collections Council (HCC) Guidelines for Environmental Control in Cultural Institutions published in 2002. The AICCM guidelines endorsed the calls of ICOM-CC and IIC for temperature and relative humidity guidelines to be achievable for the local climate, seek to reduce environmental impact and to prioritise passive control solutions and low-energy technology wherever possible.

== ASHRAE climate specifications ==
The climate specifications of the Applications Handbook of the American Society of Heating, Refrigerating, and Air-Conditioning Engineers (ASHRAE) provide a range of settings for museums, galleries, archives, and libraries based on the sensitivity of the collections and the architectural setting, which also include a description of the commensurate risks and benefits of each setting. As it was regarded that a single standard would not be a suitable option for all collections, and considering the challenge and high cost of maintaining stringent environmental control, five classes of control were created, namely: Class AA, Class A, Class B, Class C, and Class D. Temperature and relative humidity set points or annual average and allowable short fluctuations for each class are as follows:

- Class AA Precision control, no seasonal changes – 15-25°C +/-2°C; 50% +/- 5% RH (No risk of mechanical damage to most artifacts and paintings)
- Class A Precision control, some gradients or seasonal changes, not both – 15-25°C +/-2°C; 50% +/- 10% RH (Small risk of mechanical damage to high vulnerability artifacts, no mechanical risk to most artifacts, paintings, photographs, and books)
- Class B Precision control, some gradients plus winter temperature setback – 15-25°C +/-5°C; 50% RH +/- 10% (Moderate risk of mechanical damage to high vulnerability artifacts, tiny risk to most, paintings, photographs, some artifacts and books)
- Class C Prevent dampness (or other high-risk extremes) – within 25-75% RH; temperature rarely over 30°C (High risk of mechanical damage to high vulnerability artifacts, moderate risk to most, paintings, photographs, some artifacts and books)
- Class D Prevent dampness (or other high-risk extremes) – reliably below 75%RH (High risk of sudden or cumulative mechanical damage to most artifacts and paintings because of low-humidity fracture, but avoids high-humidity delamination and deformations, especially in veneers, paintings, paper, and photographs)

== AIC's Interim Environmental Guidelines ==
The Environmental Guidelines Working Group of the American Institute for Conservation of Historic & Artistic Works (AIC) developed the Interim Environmental Guidelines following the roundtable discussions in 2010 held in Boston and Milwaukee, where conservation professionals and representatives from the cultural heritage profession shared about their practices and experiences related to collections climatology and discussed how the environmental parameters can adapt to challenges in the global economy and stewardship of natural resources. The interim guidelines recommend a set point in the range of 45-55% RH with an allowable fluctuation of +/- 5% and 15-25 °C (59-77 °F) temperature.
