= Conservation and restoration of iron and steel objects =

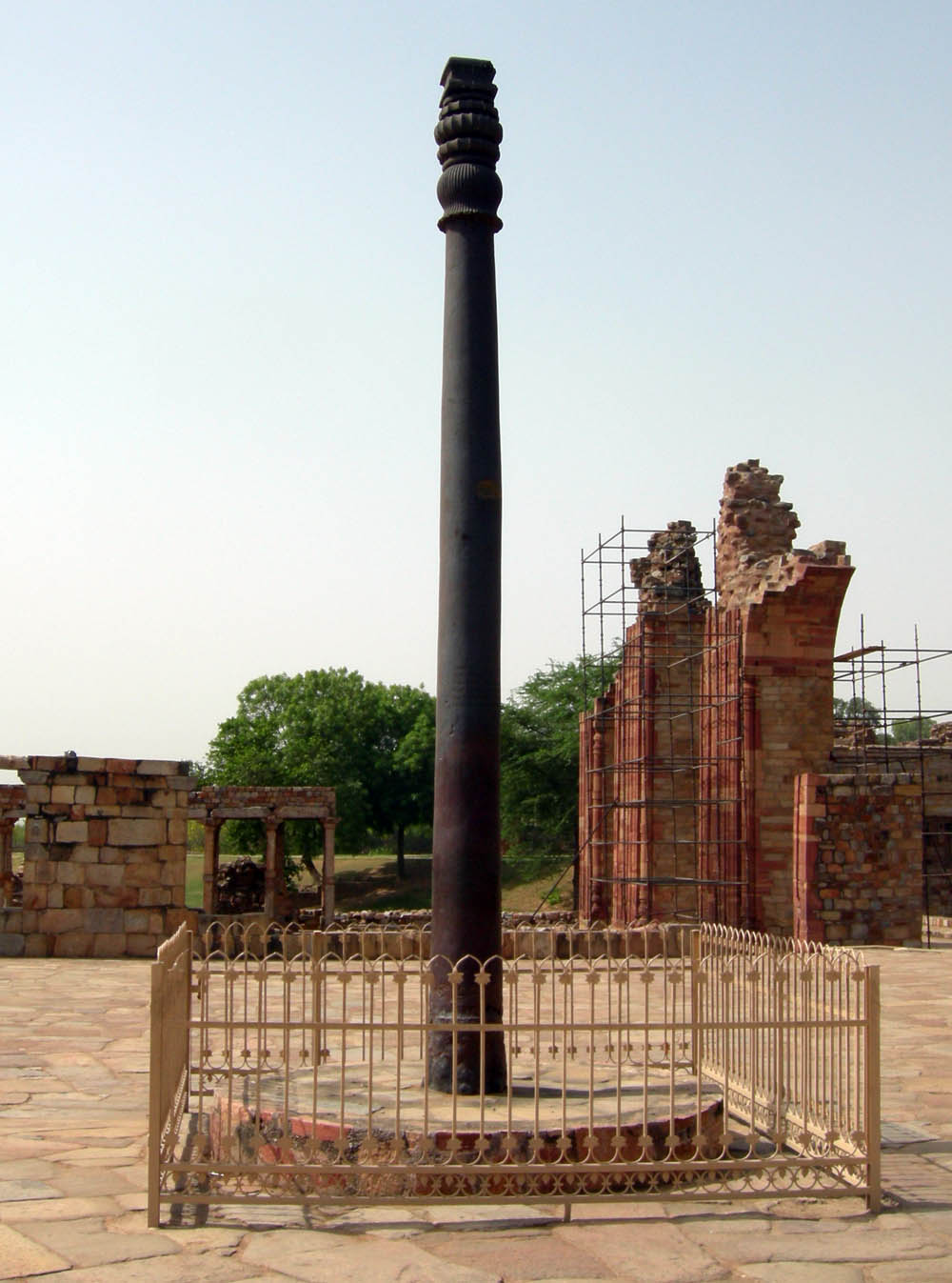
The iron pillar of Delhi is an example of the iron extraction and processing methodologies of India. It has withstood corrosion for the last 1600 years.

Iron, steel, and ferrous metals constitute a large portion of collections in museums. The conservation and restoration of iron and steel objects is an activity dedicated to the preservation and protection of objects of historical and personal value made from iron or steel. When applied to cultural heritage this activity is generally undertaken by a conservator-restorer. Historically, objects made from iron or steel were created for religious, artistic, technical, military and domestic uses. Though it is generally not possible to completely halt deterioration of any object, the act of conservation and restoration strives to prevent and slow the deterioration of the object as well as protecting the object for future use. One of the first steps in caring for iron is to examine them and determine their state, determine if they are corroding, and consider options for treatment.

The prevention and removal of surface dirt and corrosion products are some of the primary concerns of conservator-restorers when dealing with iron or steel objects, including nickel-iron meteorites. Conservation and restoration of iron and steel may begin with analysis of the environment that the objects will be stored and displayed in. Preventive conservation and understanding the agents of deterioration that affect the specific object are often considered some of the important first steps. A prerequisite for conservation and restoration of not only iron and steel, but also all collections items is systematic and well-managed, including documentation of the state of objects before, during and after treatment. Identification of materials and procedures used to produce objects and the results of any scientific research must be part of documentation, too. Last but not least, an integral part of the documentation must be a recommendation for further care of object. Once thorough documentation, analysis, and discussion has occurred, possible treatment techniques can be considered and performed on the objects.

== Identification processes and analysis ==
Analysis and observation of collections objects when considering treatment and restoration occurs at all steps of the conservation process. Metal objects such as iron and steel share properties such as strength, conduction of heat and electricity, structure and more. It is important to understand the properties before conducting treatment. Recognizing the specific metal or alloy and construction of the object can help determine their susceptibility to corrosion and can narrow down which conservation measures can be used. Once the structure and composition of the object has been observed and identified, conservator-restorers can determine the state. Surface dirt and corrosion are among the most common issues with iron and steel objects. Throughout the analysis and identification process, conservator-restorers keep clear and detailed notes. This allows them to document the past, present and future of the object for use later. These notes include the observations as mentioned above as well as the recommendations for treatment.

- Simple methods – visual examination, spot tests, specific gravity
- Scientific methods – XRF, XRD, Particle-induced X-ray emission, LIBS, SEM, electrochemical techniques, metallography
- Simple method – visual examination, spot tests
- The Oddy test – for copper, silver, and lead
- Scientific methods – xrd, SEM, metallography

=== Identification of materials associated with metals ===
- Simple methods – visual examination, spot tests, specific gravity
- Scientific methods – xrf, chromatography

=== Identification of technology used to produce objects ===
- Simple methods – visual examination
- Scientific methods – metallography, x-ray radiography, x-ray computed tomography

== Treatment ==
=== Treatment considerations ===
When determining the best course of action in the treatment of a steel or iron object great care must be taken. The person treating the object is likely a conservator, restorer, curator, archaeologist or collections manager, though private collectors may choose to treat their own collections. A conservator with training in metals and objects would be the best choice for treating steel and iron objects. The safety and longevity of the object is the highest priority, ensuring the treatment will not cause further damage. Consideration must be given to the structural integrity, artist intent, and original context. By following the Code of Ethics by AIC the treatment plan will aid a conservator in making an informed and safe decision for treatment.

=== Cleaning ===
Cleaning should be determined after a condition report is completed and photographs are taken. Any previous repairs should be documented and reviewed prior to new treatment. The proposed cleaning method needs to be justified by the condition and desired end results of the object. Potential risks should be mentioned in the treatment report and justified as acceptable risk. Before cleaning and/or treatment occurs, the conservator-restorer should consult curators and experts in the field to gain perspective on the possible ramifications of action.

- Mechanical cleaning
- Scalpel
- HEPA Vacuum
- Cloth (moist or dry)
- Cotton Swab
- Aqueous cleaning
- H_{2}O – Deionized, Reverse Osmosis, or Distilled
- Detergents
- Chemical cleaning
- Sodium Bicarbonate
- Flitz Paste Polish
- Maas
- Mineral Spirits
- Solvents
- Ultrasonic

Painted objects

Painted objects can be cleaned with polar solvents (acetone, ethanol) and non polar solvents (hexanes and toluene) or solvent mixtures (xylene). When working with solvents a conservator will use best practices in health and safety. The use of personal protection equipment is recommended.

Structural consolidation

The treatment report will indicate what type of structural treatment should be used. If the item is missing hardware it can be replaced by adding matching or similar screws and rivets. Adhesives, soldering, and welding can be used to repair a damaged structure.

Protective coatings

Protective coatings can be good options for iron and steel objects. They help retain original appearance and protect against foreign bodies such as moisture and debris that can cause rust or corrosion.

- Clear coatings – Permalac – Ormocer – Paraloid B-72
- Waxes – Renaissance Wax – Cosmolloid 80 H – Dinitrol 4010 – Poligen ES 91009
- Oils – Ballistol – WD-40
- Lacquers
- Enamels

== Archaeological objects ==
Archaeological objects made from steel and iron are man made and often constructed as tools. These items give anthropologists and archaeologists insight into peoples of different times and cultures. Archaeological iron objects are susceptible to active corrosion cause by chloride ions present in burial sites. This corrosion can take the form of sweating or weeping which leaves yellow, brown, or orange droplets on the surface in environments with an RH above 55%.

=== Cleaning ===
Mechanical methods should be used for cleaning (scalpel, micro-motor and steel brushes and abrasive discs, micro sandblasting unit, ultrasonic chisel).

=== Structural consolidation ===
Adhesives should be used, ensure reversibility of adhesive prior to conducting treatment. Glass fibre reinforcements can be used as well.

=== Stabilization ===
- alkaline sulphite treatment
- NaOH/ethylenediamine treatment
- low-temperature hydrogen plasma treatment
- subcritical fluids treatment (40 atm., 180 C, 0,5% NaOH)
- cathodic polarisation

== See also ==
- Conservation and restoration of ceramic objects
- Conservation and restoration of copper-based objects
- Conservation and restoration of glass objects
- Conservation and restoration of ivory objects
- Conservation and restoration of metals
- Conservation and restoration of silver objects
