= Conservation and restoration of metals =

Material preservation activity

Conservator cleaning Bronze Door

Conservation and restoration of metals is the activity devoted to the protection and preservation of historical (religious, artistic, technical and ethnographic) and archaeological objects made partly or entirely of metal. In it are included all activities aimed at preventing or slowing deterioration of items, as well as improving accessibility and readability of the objects of cultural heritage. Despite the fact that metals are generally considered as relatively permanent and stable materials, in contact with the environment they deteriorate gradually, some faster and some much slower. This applies especially to archaeological finds.

== Metals and the agents of deterioration ==
Lead reacting to volatile acids from oak, from exhibit case

An essential cause of deterioration is corrosion of metal objects or object deterioration by interaction with the environment. As the most influential factors of deterioration of historical objects should be pointed out as the relative humidity and air pollution while in archaeological objects a crucial role has composition, depth, humidity and amount of gasses in the soil. In cases of marine or fresh water finds the most important factors of decay are the amount and composition of soluble salts, water depth, amount of dissolved gases, the direction of water currents and the role of both microscopic and macroscopic living organisms.

Deterioration of materials associated with metals

Associated materials deteriorate depending on the origin whether they are organic or inorganic materials. Organic materials usually fail in a relatively short period of time, primarily due to biodegradation. With inorganic materials are these processes considerably longer and more complex. Amount of gases, humidity, depth and composition of soil are very important. In case of salty and sweet water finds essential are amount of gases dissolved in water, depth of water, direction of currents, and microscopic and macroscopic living organisms.

=== Agents of deterioration ===
==== Physical Force ====
Physical force is one of the most common means of damage to metal objects, which "are considered to be strong and resilient though exhibit weakness and brittleness under certain conditions." This includes breakage, dents, and scratches which occur in accidents, improper storage and mounting, mishandling, and over-polishing.

==== Fire ====
Low melting point alloys, such as pewter or lead-tin, are at risk of damage due to fire, though other metals are not at risk from the fire itself, but the pollutants caused by smoke.

==== Water ====
Cannon in advanced deterioration due to not undergoing electrolysis to remove harmful salts after retrieval from river

Contact with water, or a complete immersion in water, will lead to some degree of corrosion. The more oxygenated the water is, or the higher quantity of salt present in the water, will cause a more rapid and aggressive corrosion to metal. Short term exposure to water "can result in rapid surface corrosion, such as when flash rusting occurs on iron or steel objects that have been even momentarily wetted." Iron and steel are most affected by water.

==== Pollutants ====
Atmospheric pollutants are one of the more common agents of deterioration for metals, with tin and tin alloys most affected and resulting in corrosion. Most common pollutants include dirt, soot, dust, and chemicals. Fingerprints, salts, fatty acids, and polish residues can also cause corrosion.

==== Incorrect temperature and relative humidity ====
Higher temperatures increase the rate of chemical reactions and corrosion. Temperature also affects relative humidity, thus should be monitored and controlled. The higher the relative humidity (65% and above), the higher the risk of corrosion. Lead is the least affected by high humidity.

== Metals conservation planning ==
As with the conservation and restoration works on any other material, here are the basic tenets of conservation-restoration based on the quality of execution and the best possible preservation of cultural, historical and technological identity and integrity of objects. Minimal intervention, reversibility and repeatability of preferred treatment are essential, as well as the possibility of easy identification of restored parts. Recently, the non-toxic nature of materials and procedures used in conservation has become important too, both in relation to objects and conservator-restorer as a performer, but also in relation to the environment.

=== Research ===
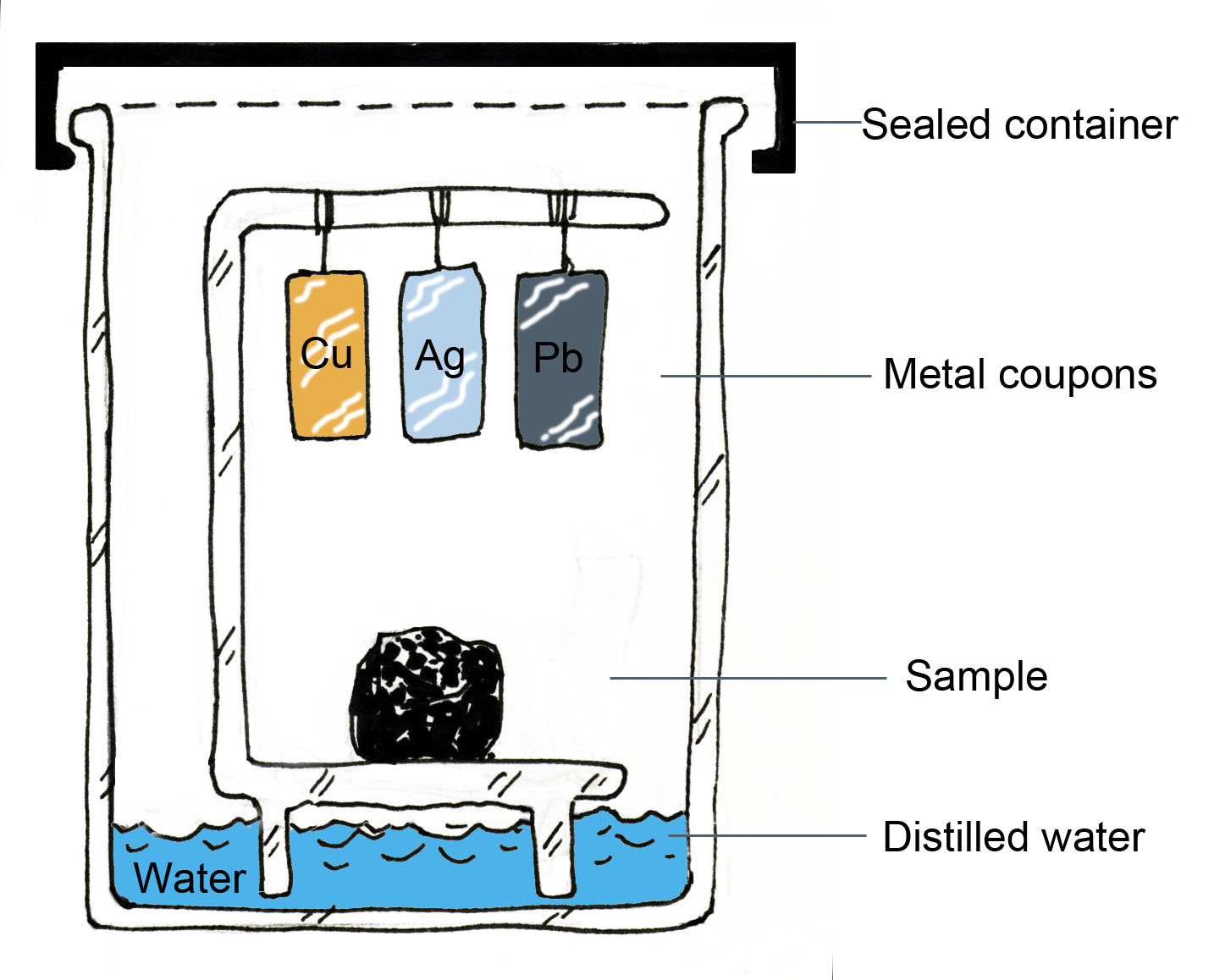
A technical description of an Oddy test, with all the proper parts included – sealed jar, metal coupons, water, and the sample

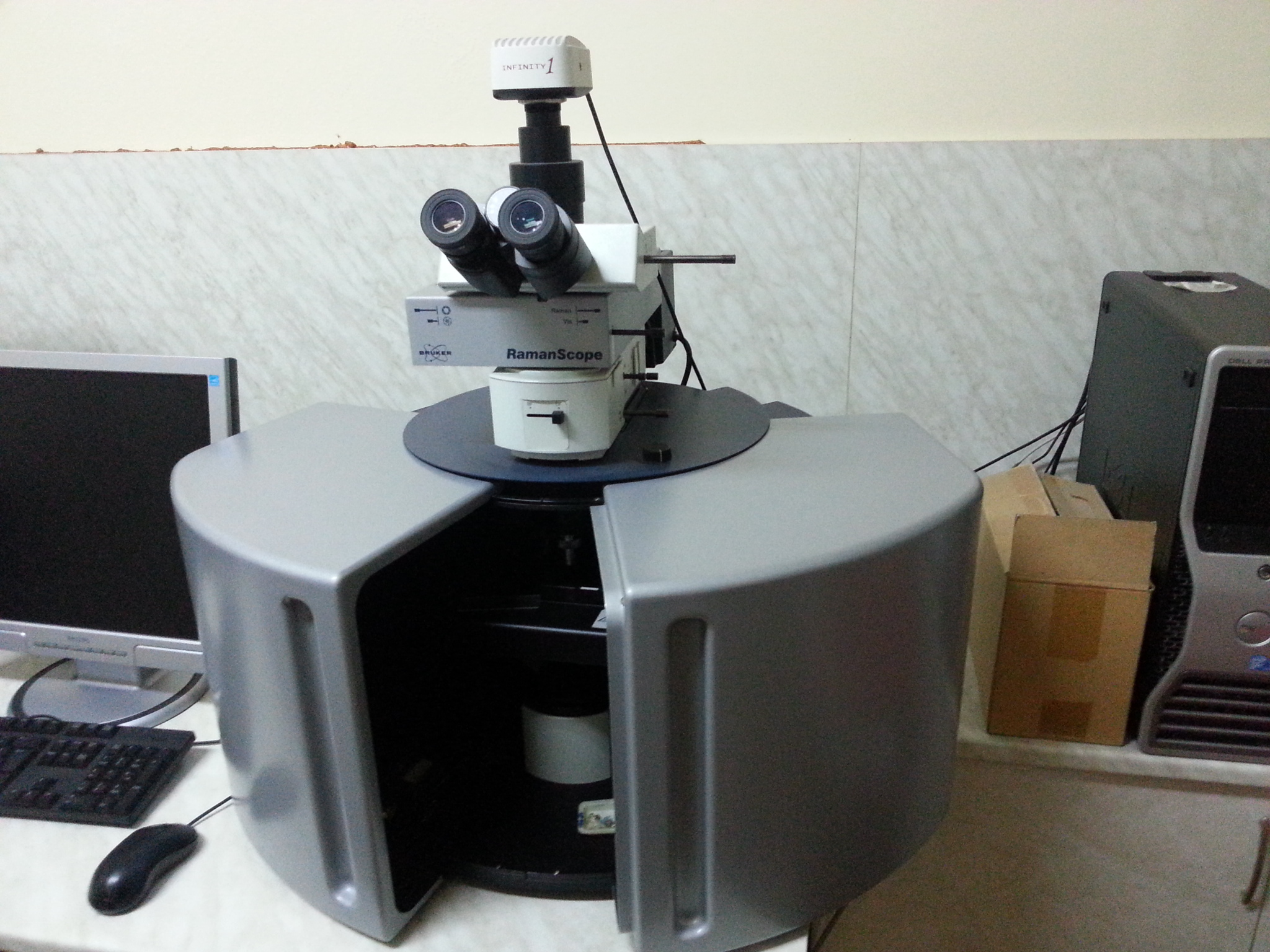
Raman spectroscopy device

Nowadays, scientific research is an integral part of conservation treatment of metals, in which different scientific methods and techniques help in determining what should be done in the preservation and care of the object. Conservators investigate the materials and techniques used in the creation of an object to better understand and diagnose an object's condition and make plans for effective treatment.

Identification of metals and alloys

- Simple methods – visual examination, spot tests, specific gravity
- Scientific methods – X-ray fluorescence, X-ray diffraction (XRD), Particle-induced X-ray emission, LIBS, SEM, electrochemical techniques, metallography

Identification of corrosion processes and products

- Simple method – visual examination, spot tests
- The Oddy test – for copper, silver, and lead
- Scientific methods – X-ray Diffraction, SEM, metallography

Identification of materials associated with metals

- Simple methods – visual examination, spot tests, specific gravity
- Scientific methods – X-ray fluorescence, chromatography, Raman spectroscopy

Identification of technology used to produce objects

- Simple methods – visual examination
- Scientific methods – metallography, x-ray radiography, x-ray computed tomography

=== Decision making ===
In preparing the strategy of a metals conservation project, an interdisciplinary approach is essential. This implies the participation and close collaboration between as many experts as is possible. At minimum, the curator (archaeologist, historian, or art historian), a scientist specialized in the corrosion of metallic objects of cultural heritage, and the conservator or restorer should be involved in the project.

=== Documentation ===
Systematic and well-managed documentation is an essential prerequisite for quality conservation and restoration treatment as "it is no longer considered acceptable to undertake a conservation treatment without recording the object and the intervention." Conservation documentation should include the state of the object's condition before, during, and after treatment. Any technique used to assess the object's condition should be documented as well. Conservation "documentation can also be viewed as a 'surrogate object', and can therefore form part of preventive conservation strategies intended to enhance access to information while reducing the handling of objects." Although documentation requirements differ across institutions, most records follow the same general format, including:

- Object data, such as location, ownership, and accession records
- Progress data, such as the date the object was received for treatment and when treatment is completed
- Technical data, such as examination results and analysis
- Object condition and treatment data, including materials and equipment used in treatment
- Recommendations, such as advice for storage and display or reexamination and further care of the object
- References, photographs, and diagrams

=== Ethics and ethical problems in metals conservation ===
The ethical concept of conservation of metal objects in principle is the same as those in other fields of conservation-restoration of cultural heritage.

However, there are several specific problems that can only be found in the conservation of metals; problems of heat treatment of archaeological objects, and the problem of radical restoration of historic, technical, and architectonic objects too.

While the first case problem is primarily in the destruction of valuable scientific data, the problems in the case of technical, architectural, and historical objects are that radically restored items only simulate the original appearance of the object, thus that object can be considered more or less fake, which only superficially simulate long-lost or the never existing state of an object. Whenever possible the preservation of real historical substance is preferred.

Ethical problems connected with conservation of sacred metallic heritage objects can be included too.

== Preventive conservation ==
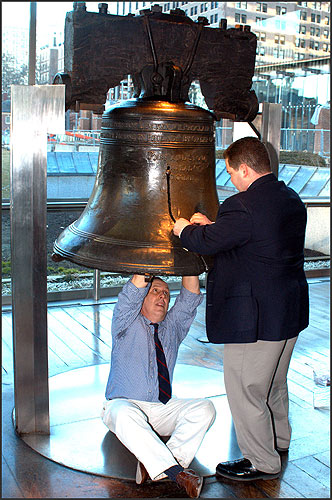
Engineers attached wireless sensors to monitor the slightest changes in the Liberty Bell's famous fissure

Preventive conservation, also known as collections care or risk management, encompasses all actions taken to prolong the life of an object." and is an important element of museum policy. Members of the museum profession are entrusted to create and maintain a protective environment for the collections in their care. A good preventive conservation program minimizes the need for conservation treatment by blocking, avoiding, or minimizing the agents of deterioration. Emergency planning, environmental safeguards and monitoring are all types of preventive conservation. Scientific research continues to discover new ways of safeguarding collections. Today various monitoring devices assist in the observation of changes in the Agents of Deterioration and other changes that may assist in diagnosing destructive activity before it is a disaster. In the image to the right a device is being attached to the Liberty Bell to monitor any changes in the crack. Metallic heritage objects are sensitive to environmental conditions such as exposure to light and ultraviolet light, temperature, relative humidity, water and moisture, and various pollutants especially chloride salts. Safeguards of protection against threats of natural disasters such as flood or fire need to be planned for and maintaining an environment that keep all Agents of Deterioration within safe limits and controlling their fluctuation will assist in the preservation of metals.

Whether in storage, on display, or in transit metals are best preserved in a "moderate climate that avoids extreme temperature and RH fluctuations and that excludes daylight and/or filters out ultraviolet light and infrared radiation and air pollution provides the appropriate environment for collection preservation." A controlled environment can protect metals from polluted air, dust, ultraviolet radiation, and excessive relative humidity – ideal values are temperature of 16–20 °C (61–68 °F) and up to 40% (35–55% according to recent Canadian Conservation Institute recommendations) relative humidity, noting that if metal is combined with organic materials, relative humidity should not be below 45%. Archaeological objects are best stored in rooms (or plastic boxes) with very low relative humidity, except if they come from a bog or high water environment, in which case the right equilibrium with the environment needs to be found. Particularly valuable items can be placed in sealed micro-climate containers with an inert gas such as nitrogen or argon. Metals with active corrosion fare better with lower relative humidity: copper or copper alloy objects up to 35% RH and iron objects 12–15% RH.

Clean and well organized storage areas are important but materials in the environment are also considered. Wood and wood-based products (particle board, plywood) can off-gas and cause metals to deteriorate. Shelves in the storerooms are best when made of stainless steel or chlorine and acetate free plastic or powder coated steel. Metals can be damaged by the use of rubber, felt, wool or the oil on our skin, so it is recommended to wear cotton gloves when handling metal objects. Other materials stored with or a part of a metal object, may impact or be impacted by the environment. Organic materials for instance may hold moisture or be more susceptible to deterioration than metals. This could impact the metals' stability.

Lighting levels for metal preservation is best kept below 300 lux (up to 150 lux in case of lacquered or painted objects, up to 50 lux in case of objects with light sensitive materials). There are many lighting options available, including LED lights and filters that block harmful ultraviolet rays.

Monitoring the condition of the metals assists in determining when and if other conservation measures are needed including restorative conservation work and/or the services of a qualified conservator. Whether written, drawn or photographed, documentation of a metal object will record changes of the object over time. This allows slow deterioration that may go unnoticed to be recognized and alleviated.

== Interventive conservation ==
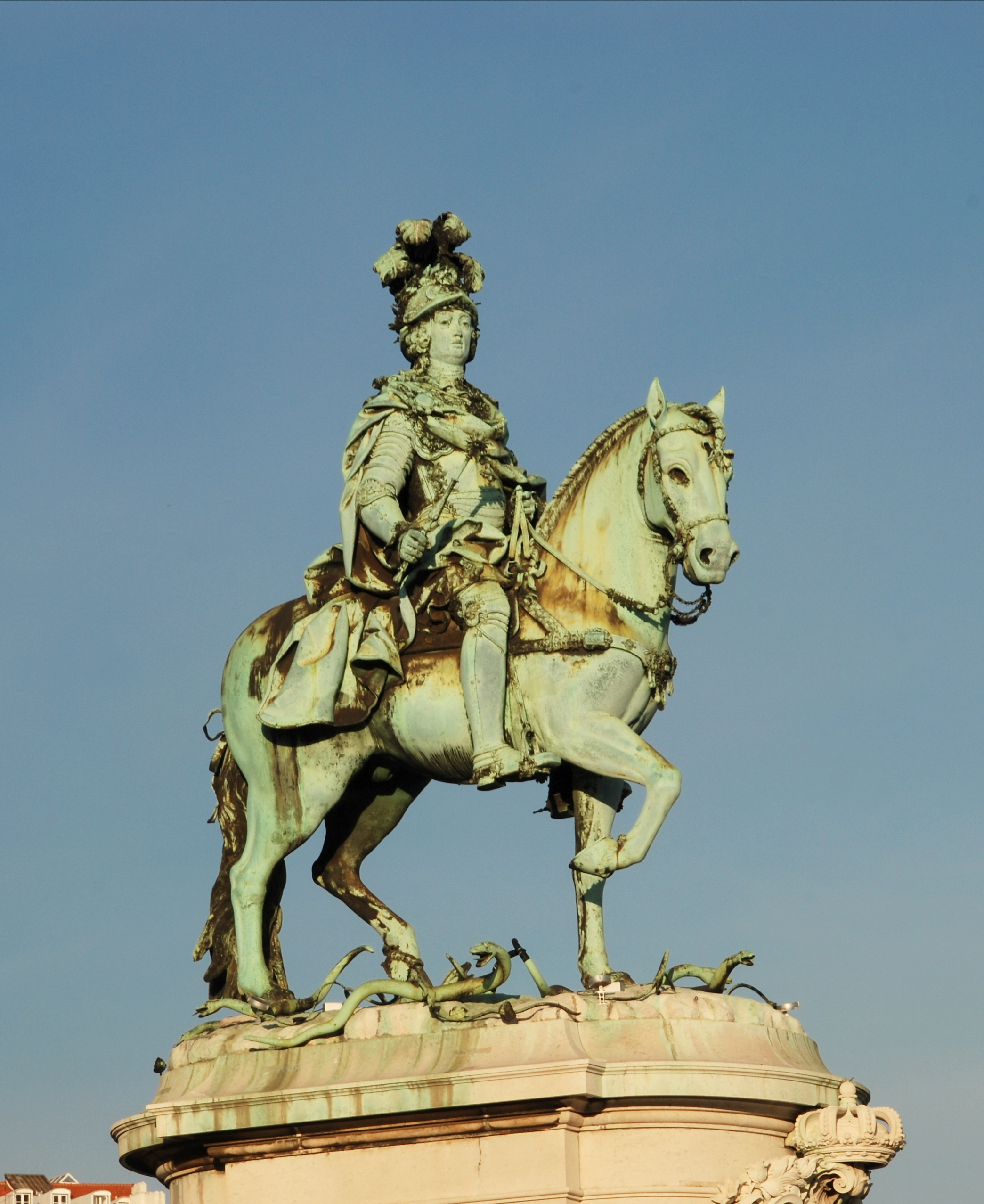
Statue of Joseph I of Portugal in Lisbon, showing advanced oxidation (2011)

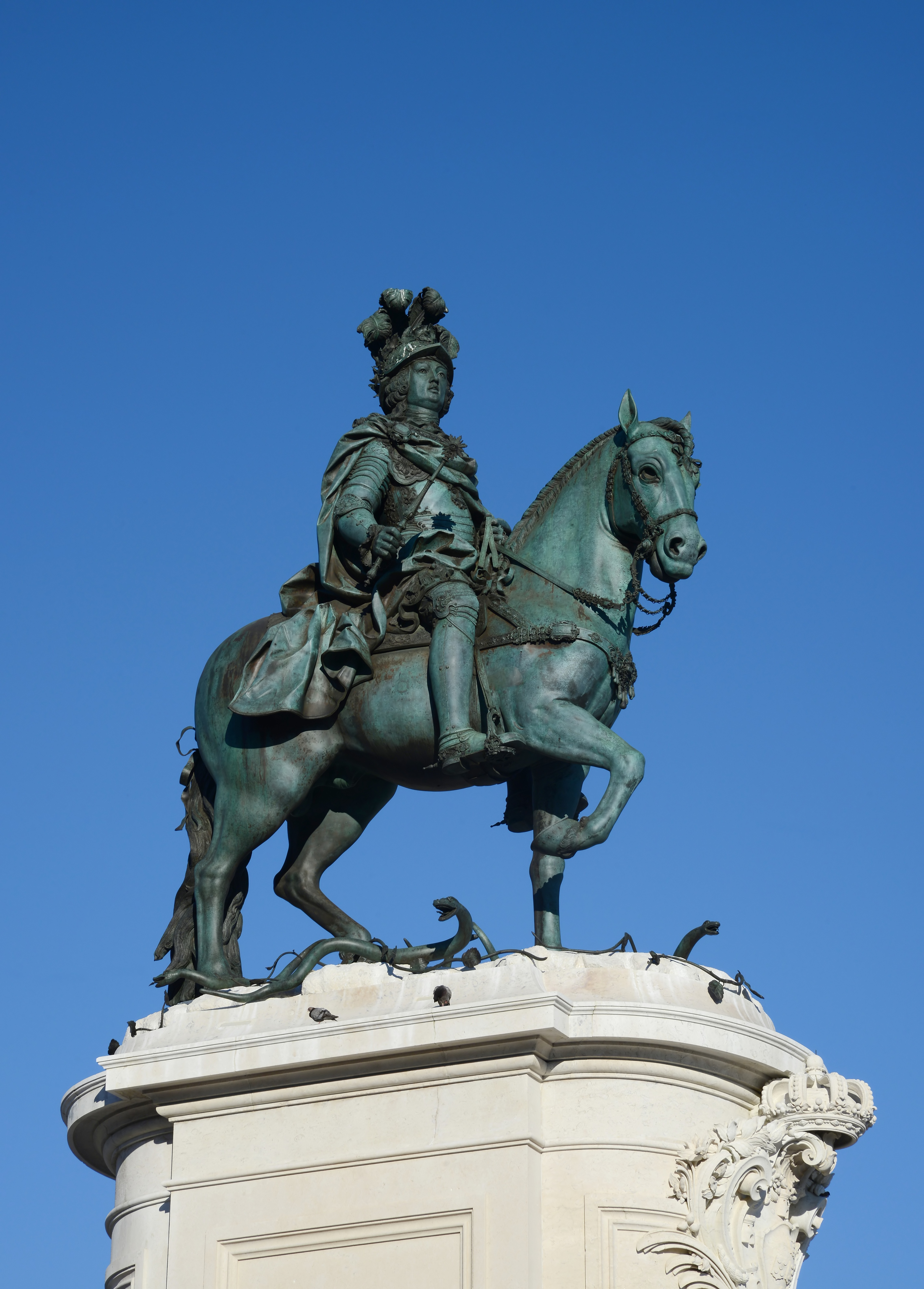
Statue in 2015, after patina removal (2012–13), showing the original 1775 finish.

Interventive conservation or treatment is an intrusion and a deliberate attempt to alter the physical and/or chemical aspects of an object in an attempt to preserve and/or restore object. "In accordance with NPS Management Policies, conservation treatments are done as a last resort, kept to a minimum, and should be reversible." One of the main proponents of the ethics of conservation is to do nothing. Preserving the original materials and minimizing invasive treatments reduces "the chances of compromising the aesthetic, archaeological, cultural, historical, physical, religious, or scientific integrity of objects." Interventive treatments are needed when an object is disintegrating or fragile and the treatment will protect the object and/or stop the decay. Also the restoration of an object for visual display and presentation is also a possibility which may need pre-thought with discussions and negotiations with the parties involved. Planning will assist in making the best decision in a restorative, interventive treatment for the object and the situation. Similar to many other bronze statues, the statue of Joseph of Portugal had an interventive conservation treatment. The conservation decision made to remove the patina most likely happened for two reasons. Firstly, it improves the visual impression of the statue; and secondly, the patina is a corrosive process slowly destroying the metal.

== Notable metal conservators and organizations ==
=== 1800s and early 1900s ===
Blade showing bronze disease

Prior to the late 1800s treatments consisted of reconstruction and repair by craftsmen, familiar with the object materials and corrosion was thought to be a type of bacteria. In the late 1800s, scientists began looking into understanding the causes of deterioration and corrosion. In 1888: Flinders Petrie (1853-1942) published an article on the excavation and conservation of small objects and German chemist, Friedrich Rathgen, (1862-1942), became not only the first director of the Chemical Laboratory of the Royal Museums of Berlin but the first scientist employed in a museum laboratory. Rathgen utilized electrolytic reduction to remove the corrosive patina on the Egyptian bronze Collection at the Royal Museum to eliminate chloride salts. At the turn of the century French chemist, Marcellin Berthelot(1827-1907), presented several papers before the French Academy of Sciences stating the deterioration of bronze and silver artifacts were due to a cyclic process of corrosive chloride salts. Rathgen continued scientific research on Bronze disease to understand the chemical conversion of the metal due to the presence of moisture. Rathgen applied a scientific method to museum artifact preservation and by continuing to research, develop, apply and publish his findings on his physical and chemical methods and formulating guidelines for application, he became a principle force in the standard's acceptance. He is considered the founder of modern chemical conservation science, writing the first fully comprehensive treatment handbook of conservation to be published. Die Konservierung von Altertumsfun- den [The Conservation of Antiquities] was first published in 1898, translated to English in 1905, and is still in print.

=== Mid-1900s ===
During World War I (WWI) bombings, museums protected their collections by moving them to various locations. Many went into the damp London tunnels. After the war, the British Museum, lucky enough not to be bombed, reassembled the collection. After two years stored in high humidity, the objects were severely damaged with metal corrosion, mold and salt efflorescence. The UK Department of Scientific and Industrial Research (DSIR) hired Scottish Alexander Scott (1853–1947), as director of scientific research in what became the British Research Laboratory in 1920. In 1922, conservator and archaeologist, Harold Plenderleith (1898–1997), became the first full time chemist affiliated with a museum laboratory. Together they started the first scientific conservation in the United Kingdom while studying the instability of the rapid deterioration. In 1934, Harold Plenderleith published The Preservation of Antiquities, which contains vital information on the conservation preservation of metals and the Agents of Deterioration we know today.

In the 1930s and 1940s, institutions in western Europe and the United States recognized the need for prevention of artifacts before repair and did extensive studies. Several large museums were adding research laboratories to their institutions. In 1931, the International Museums Office of the League of Nations, held their first conservation conference on scientific method applications in Rome. Foreshadowing the International Council of Museums (ICOM) in 1946 with its first general conference held in Paris in 1948.

In preparation of WWII the museums again put the art into the underground tube tunnels but this time crates were stacked to allow air circulation. The British Museum commissioned a secret climate-controlled tunnel in Aberystwyth to store the artwork during the war. Moving and re-moving art and artifacts to stable and healthy environmental conditions permitted the deterioration to be minimal compared to WWI. Plenderleith who treated the artifacts after WWI, found no damage to the British Museum's collection when they returned from the controlled tunnel environment.

The United States preservation efforts, after the Pearl Harbor bombing, were unorganized and haphazard. Several museum directors believed in preservation conservation. George L. Stout, founder of the first conservation laboratory in the United States and one of the Monuments Men in Europe, was determined to create a standard of long-term preservation conservation. In 1949, his lecture for the American Association of Museums conference in Chicago, "Long-range Conservation" raised the question of "Why?" rather than "What? do we conserve. This began the spread of a collective consciousness. As a result, in 1950, the International Institute for Conservation of Historic and Artistic Works (IIC) was formed and Stout became its first president. In 1958, the ICC published an updated edition of H.J. Plenderlief's "The Conservation of Antiquities and Works of Art". One of the first systematic explanation of the mechanisms of deterioration including metals(Obviously the significance of the work of M.V. Farmakovskij in the former USSR at that time was not known as the fact that first book dedicated to metal conservation in the modern sense was published in USSR 1935, and the fact that Farmakovskij's work dedicated to the same issue as Plenderleith's was posthumously published already in 1947.).

=== Late 1900s ===
In 1951, at the Sixth Session of United Nations Educational, Scientific and Cultural Organization (UNESCO) general conference, the Swiss government proposed establishment of a global institution to encourage research and awareness of conservation. In 1959, Plenderleith became the first director of the International Centre for the Study of Preservation and restoration of Cultural Property (ICCROM).

The collective mindset for conservation preservation changed the way museums and their directors address collections. Two other conservators of metallurgy are:

- Robert M. Organ (1920–2011), a conservation scientist specializing in metals at the British Museum, whose work in metal deteripration especially in the areas of archaeological corroded bronze and silver are essential to the profession of modern conservation.
- Otto Nedbal, goldsmith and metal restorer and conservator, taught at the University of Vienna founding the first class in metal and enamel restoration in 1964.

=== 2000s ===
As a result of scientific research published throughout the twentieth century, conservation efforts have increasingly focused on the preservation of a collection, the control of the environment and the agents of deterioration.

ICOM -CC Metals working group Conferences in 1995, 1998, 2001, 2004, 2007, 2010, 2013, 2016, 2019, 2022 and 2025 all focused on metal conservation. These conferences provided important insights into metals deterioration and provided information on the newest research innovations regarding preservation and conservation treatments of metals and their interactions with their surroundings

The last thirty plus years have also stressed minimalist conservation measures, but these methods of treatment can often come into conflict with visitor expectations and researchers’ use of the objects. The care of a collection is complex and an interdisciplinary approach of concessions and compromises taking in to account all the criteria is now needed with everyone's input.

== See also ==
- Conservation and restoration of outdoor bronze artworks
- Conservation and restoration of copper-based objects
- Conservation and restoration of ferrous objects
- Conservation and restoration of glass objects
- Conservation and restoration of ivory objects
- Conservation and restoration of ceramic objects
- Conservation and restoration of silver objects

== Online magazines ==
- BROMEC Bulletin of Research on Metal Conservation

== Metals conservation blogs ==
- Armas protohistóricas con magnetita, by Jesús Alonso López
- Conservation of metals - by Catia Viegas-Wesolowska

== Free software that can be used for metals conservation ==
- The Use of Expert Systems in Conservation
- The Modular Cleaning Program
- Download free conservators documentation software

== See also ==
- Conservation and restoration of outdoor bronze objects
- Conservation and restoration of copper-based objects
- Conservation and restoration of ferrous objects
- Conservation and restoration of glass objects
- Conservation and restoration of ivory objects
- Conservation and restoration of ceramic objects
- Conservation and restoration of silver objects
