= Conservation and restoration of silver objects =

Preservation of heritage collections

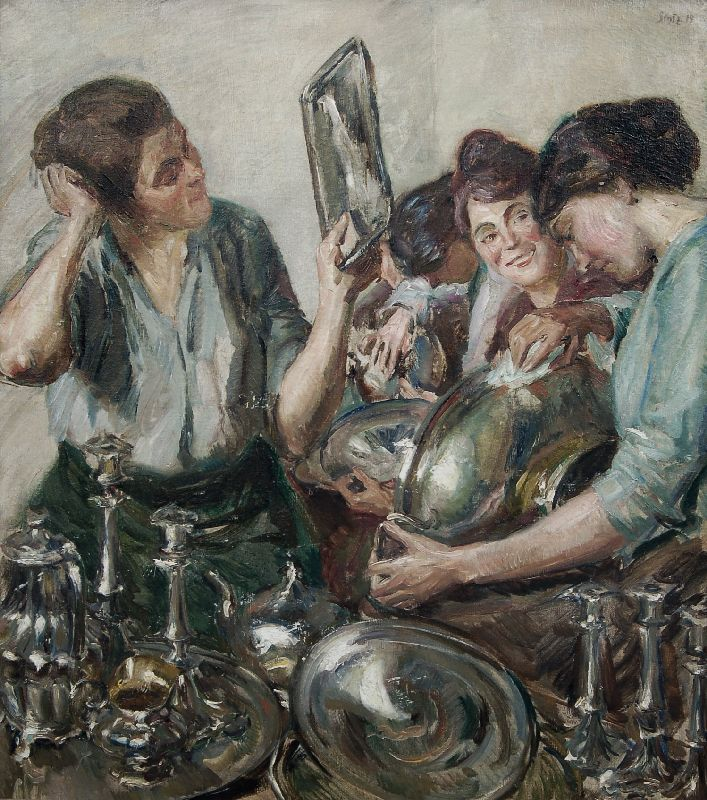
A 1919 painting by Fritz Stotz depicting women polishing and cleaning household silver

The conservation and restoration of silver objects is an activity dedicated to the preservation and protection of objects of historical and personal value made from silver. When applied to cultural heritage this activity is generally undertaken by a conservator-restorer.

Historically, objects made from silver were created for religious, artistic, technical, and domestic uses. The act of conservation and restoration strives to prevent and slow the deterioration of the object as well as protecting the object for future use. The prevention and removal of surface tarnish is the primary concern of conservator-restorers when dealing with silver objects.

== Use of silver ==
Silver is a precious metal that has been mined for use as early as 4000 BC in Anatolia (Modern Turkey). Because silver is malleable and durable it has been used for many purposes which include jewelry, tableware, ornaments, coins, musical instruments and movie film. It is often used as a plating on other metals.

== Tarnish ==
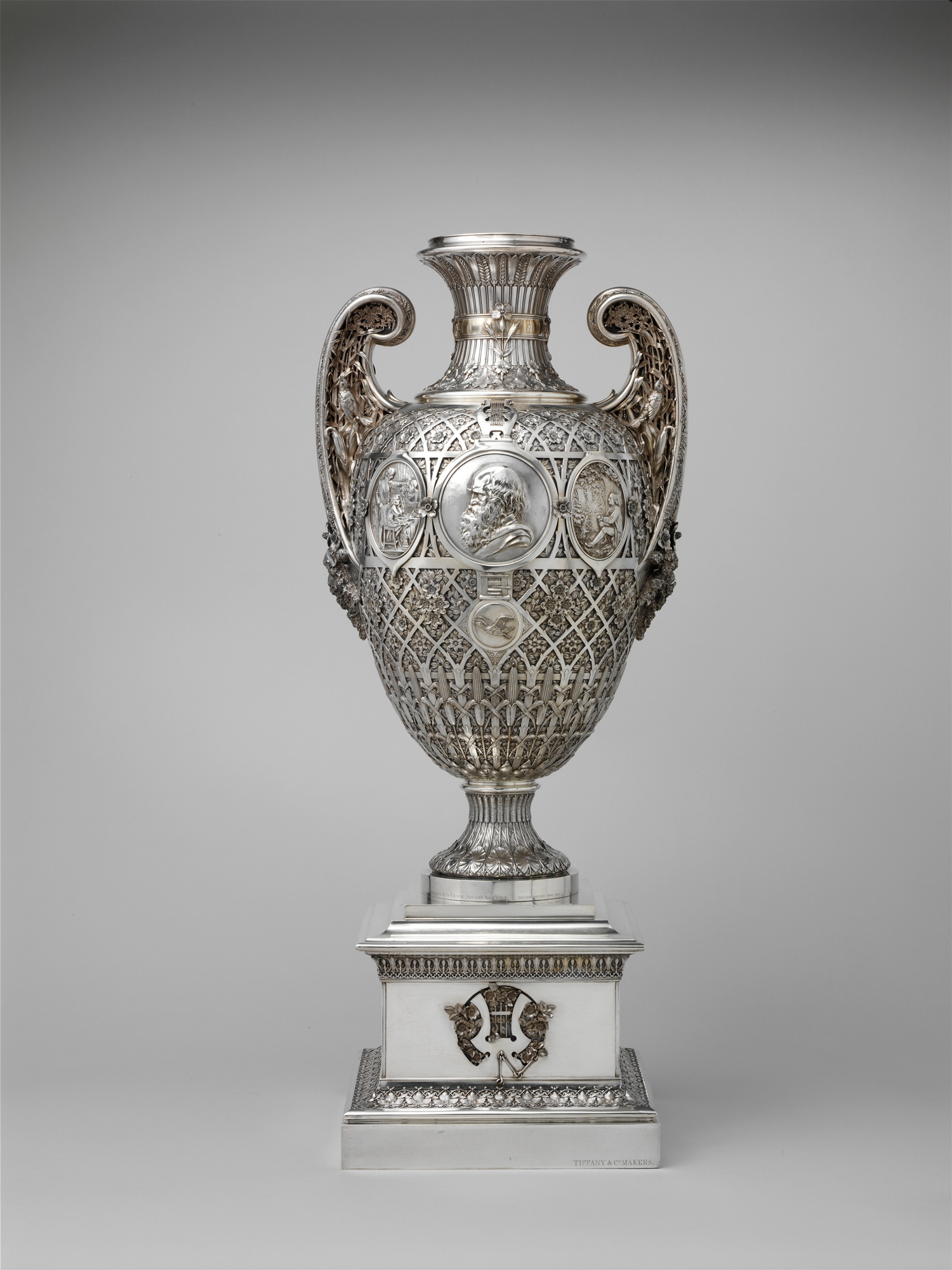
Bryant Vase, silver,1875-1876., Metropolitan Museum of Art, New York

All metals, apart from pure gold, will corrode naturally when exposed to certain chemicals which can be present in air. High relative humidity, moisture, and air pollutants are common causes of corrosion in metals, including silver. Silver is known in the chemistry world as a noble metal, which means it is resistant to corrosion, but not completely immune. Whether silver plating or pure silver, the composite of the metal will tarnish when exposed to air and sulfur.

Tarnish is a chemical reaction on the surface of metal (copper, brass, silver, etc.) and causes a layer of corrosion. In the case of silver tarnish, the silver combines with sulfur and forms silver sulfide (Ag_{2}S), which is black. The original silver surface can be restored if the layer of silver sulfide is removed. On some metals, tarnish serves as a protective layer known as a patina and is typically found on copper and bronze roofing, architectural elements, statues and bells.

== Collections care ==
=== Storage and handling ===
Proper handling, storage, and treatment can help prevent deterioration of silver objects. Metals are best conserved when stored in an even and low humidity atmosphere, ideally at 40% relative humidity or lower. Silver tends to corrode easily when stored in damp, moist locations such as a basement because it will accelerate tarnishing. Some storage boxes contain materials, such as wood, acidic paper, rubber, and adhesives, that can off-gas corrosive materials. Conservators wear nitrile gloves when handling silver to prevent oils, ammonia, and salts from the skin from corroding the surface.

=== Preventing interaction with sulfur gases ===
Sulfur-containing gases and particulates can tarnish the surface of silver. These corrosive agents can come from air pollution, paints, textiles, bacterial by-products, and other chemically treated objects or building materials. When storing silver, museum conservators wrap silver in sulfur-free tissue paper and store in a tight sealed polyethylene bag. Activated charcoal is sometimes used to absorb sulfur by placing it in the bag but not in direct contact with the object. Likewise, Pacific Silver Cloth has also been used by museums to prevent tarnishing.

=== Lacquering ===
Lacquering is the process of creating a hard durable finish on the surface of an object such as wood or metal. Polished silver is sometimes lacquered to protect against tarnish and to prevent over-polishing. There are different types of resins that are used such as Acryloid B-72 and Incralac. If silver pieces are being displayed in the open, such as in a house or museum exhibit case, it is difficult to prevent corrosion from air exposure. A surface coating will prevent or slow tarnishing and is a service done by professionals or conservator. One of the most used coatings is Agateen.

Lacquer is applied to a surface that has been cleaned with ethanol, acetone, or methyl ethyl ketone. Oils from human hands prevent the lacquer from adhering to the silver. Agateen No. 27 (cellulose nitrate) and Paraloid B-72 are the most commonly used lacquers however there is a debate which lacquer, cellulose nitrate or acrylic, is best.

== Historic methods of treating silver work ==
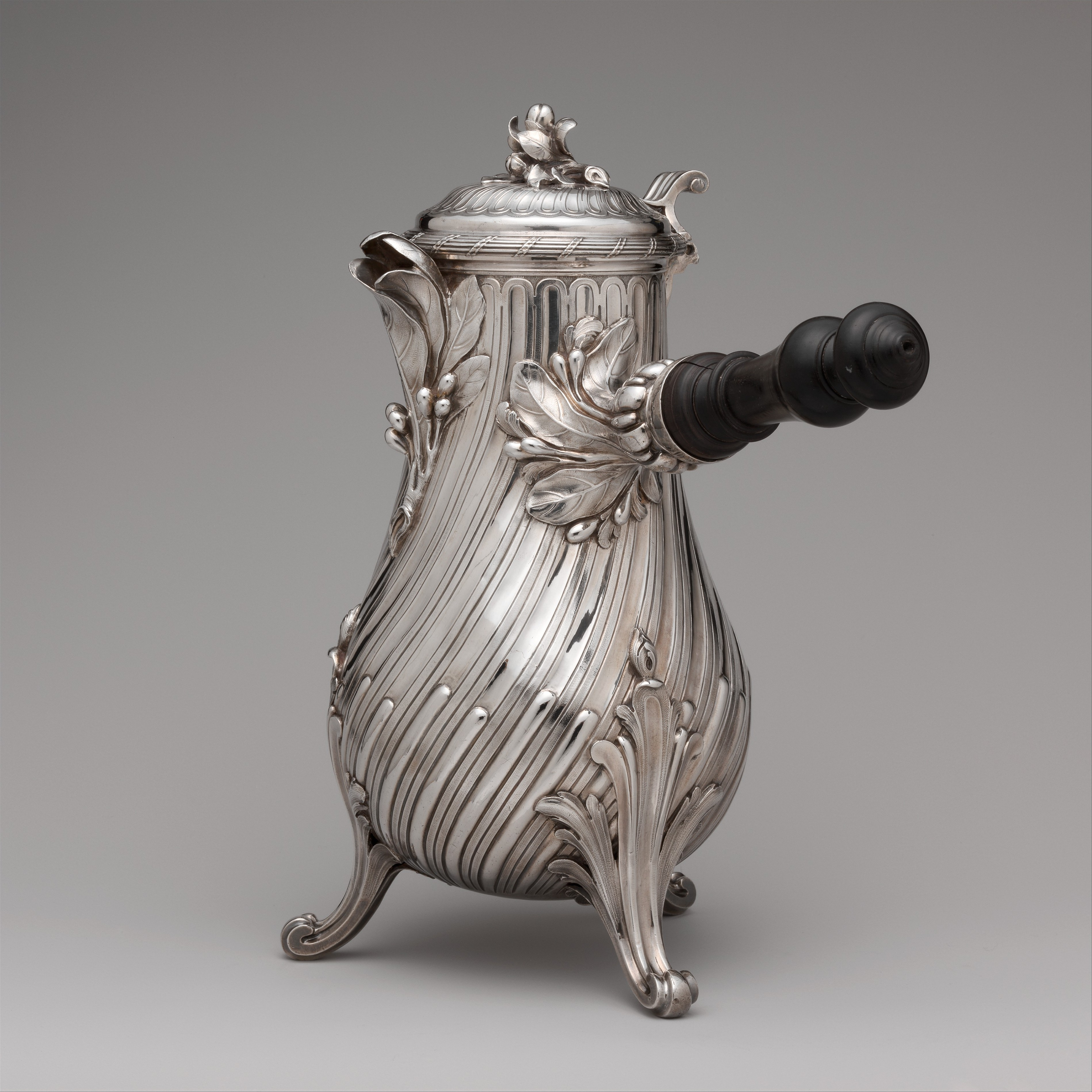
Coffepot, silver, ebony, Metropolitan Museum of Art, New York

The art of crafting objects out of silver, also known as silversmithing, has been around for centuries. With the creation of hand-made silver objects, the issue of cleaning and caring for these items was a concern. Silversmiths would give advice to clients on how to properly care for their silver. Here are examples of instructions given by silversmiths in the 17th and 18th cert

1679 – "...rubb the flagons and chalices from topp to the Bottome, not crosswise, but the Bason and patnes are to be rubb’d roundwise, not acrosse, and by noe means use either chalk, sand, or salt"

Although dated, these instructions are very similar to current methods of cleaning and polishing of silver.

== Current practices ==
The following sections discuss the different methods in which silver objects can be cleaned and polished. Some of the methods described below can cause damage to the surface of the silver, such as scratching or accelerated tarnishing. A conservator should be consulted if there are any questions about the methods below especially when dealing with archaeological, antique or sensitive objects.

=== Museum conservation practices – historical objects ===
Water sensitive objects are masked in plastic wrap to avoid getting wet. A slurry of precipitated (pharmaceutical grade) calcium carbonate and deionized water is created and rubbed onto the silver piece with a cotton rag or cotton ball. It is recommended that the slurry be tested on the bottom or in a non-visible area of the silver for abrasiveness. If the slurry is too abrasive it will scratch the surface and increase the potential for future tarnishing. The polish is applied with a soft cloth and polished in a circular motion.

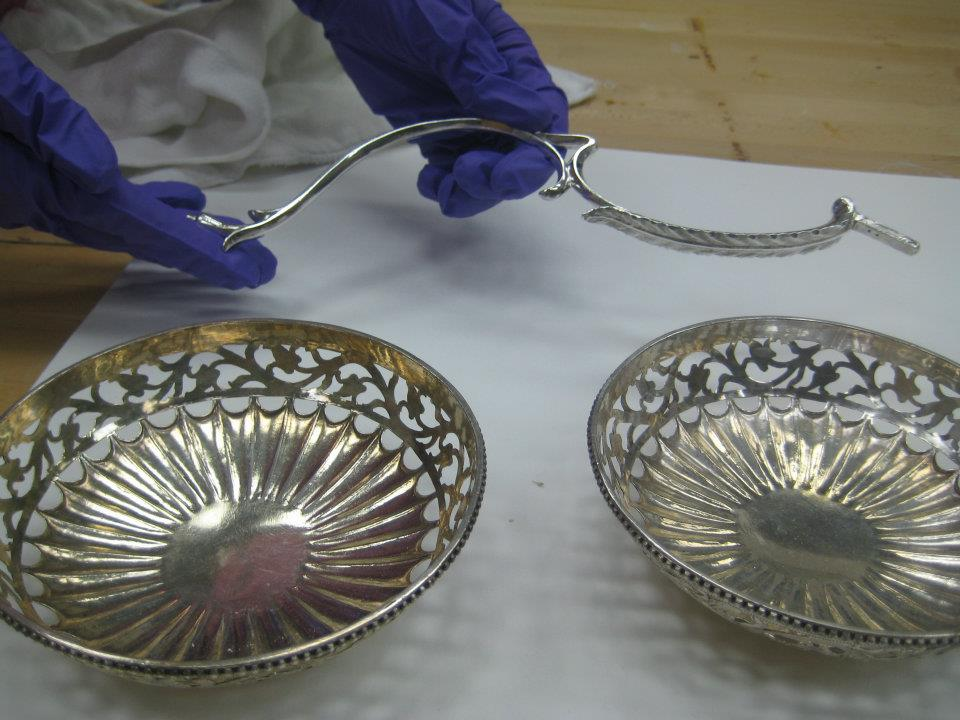
Parts of a silver object from Indianapolis Museum of Art collection, in the process of being polished with calcium carbonate. An unpolished piece is on the left and a finished piece on the right.

Ethyl alcohol is sometimes added to the slurry mixture to help dry out excess water. The slurry mixture is applied throughout the piece until completely polished. Dark tarnish spots are sometimes located on the surface and may need to be polished more than once to remove. Over polishing is an issue with silver and can cause harm to the surface of the metal. After polishing, the silver object is rinsed in deionized water and dried with a cotton cloth.

Once cleaned and dried the silver is wrapped in acid-free tissue paper and placed in a sealed plastic bag. A 3M anti-tarnish strip is also placed in the bag to absorb any sulfur that may be in the air. The tissue paper is used as a buffer to prevent the silver surface coming into contact with the anti-tarnish strip.

=== Waddings ===
Waddings are cloths that have been infused with an organic solvent. Because they contain solvents instead of water, they can be used for polishing metal objects that cannot be exposed to water. Polishing waddings will leave abrasive particles behind and the residue can be removed using a soft brush or by rubbing the surface with a soft linen cloth.

=== Home / DIY methods ===
The following sections include home methods that use commonly available household items such as water and salt to clean the surface of silver. Some of the methods use heat which may be dangerous to silver tableware such as candlesticks or knife handles. Water trapped in crevices of silver objects can accelerate tarnishing.

Single Ingredient – Toothpaste is applied with a clean cloth as a gentle abrasive with a soft bristle toothbrush and rinsed in water.

Boiling Water Bath – The silver object or pieces are placed into an aluminum pot and covered with water. One tablespoon of salt and baking soda is added and boiled for three minutes. After cooling, the silver is placed into a warm soapy water mixture and cleaned with a cotton cloth and then dried with a separate cotton cloth.

Soaking bath – A glass roasting pan is lined with aluminum foil with the dull side facing downwards. The silver is placed atop of the foil and a quart of boiling water is poured over the pieces with two tablespoons of baking soda. The silver soaks for five minutes and is dried with a clean cloth.

=== Chemical dips ===
A popular and quick method for polishing silver is the use of chemical dips. Dips work by dissolving the tarnished surface of the silver at a highly accelerated rate. Many dips are made of acids and other agents. Acids are very corrosive and pose a danger to the silver surface as well as to the user. Dips can be harmful to objects with sealed surfaces such as candlesticks, trophies and teapots with hollow components because the chemical could leak into the hollow area and can never be removed. Unlike museum quality polishing, employing a slurry of calcium carbonate and deionized water, dips are quicker and less expensive. However, dips are more abrasive to the surfaces of silver, gold, and other metals. Jeffrey Herman confirms this method damages silver.

=== ultrasonic cleaning ===
Can be used but only on historic objects never on archaeology objects.

=== Laser cleaning ===
Can be used. The above process wil naturally lead to the cleaning of silver, which is passed through lasers to remove any dirt and pollutants.

=== Plasma cleaning ===
Can be used.

=== Polishing wheels ===
Polishing wheels, also known as buffing wheels or polishing mops, use a specific electric tool to physically remove tarnish from the surface rather than chemically as with the calcium carbonate slurry or commercial dips.

Because silver is soft, the surface can be easily cut or scratched. The main buffing type used for silver, gold, and plated objects is Canton flannel. This flannel is made of very soft material and will not scratch the plated, lacquered, or other soft surfaces.

Along with buffing wheels, particular compounds are used to help polish the material. Two main types of compounds used for silver and gold surfaces are red and blue compounds. Red, also known as jeweler's rouge, polishes without any cutting action. The blue compound is a dryer compound and is used with a grease-less wheel that also does not cut or scratch the surface.

== Museum conservation practices – Archaeology objects ==
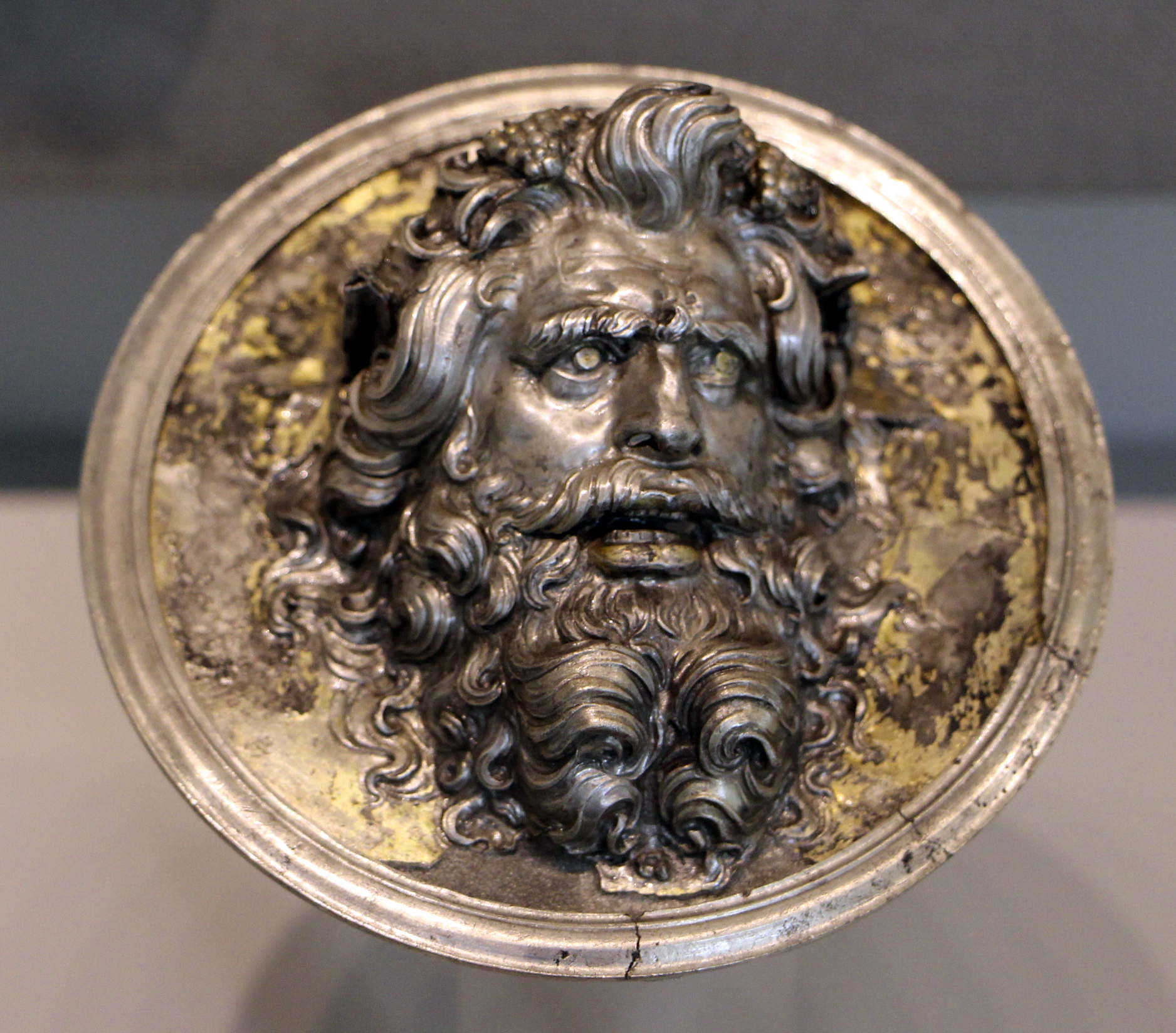
Hellenistic silver medallion, partly gilt, Miletopoli, 2nd–1st centuries BC, after conservation, Antikensammlung Berlin

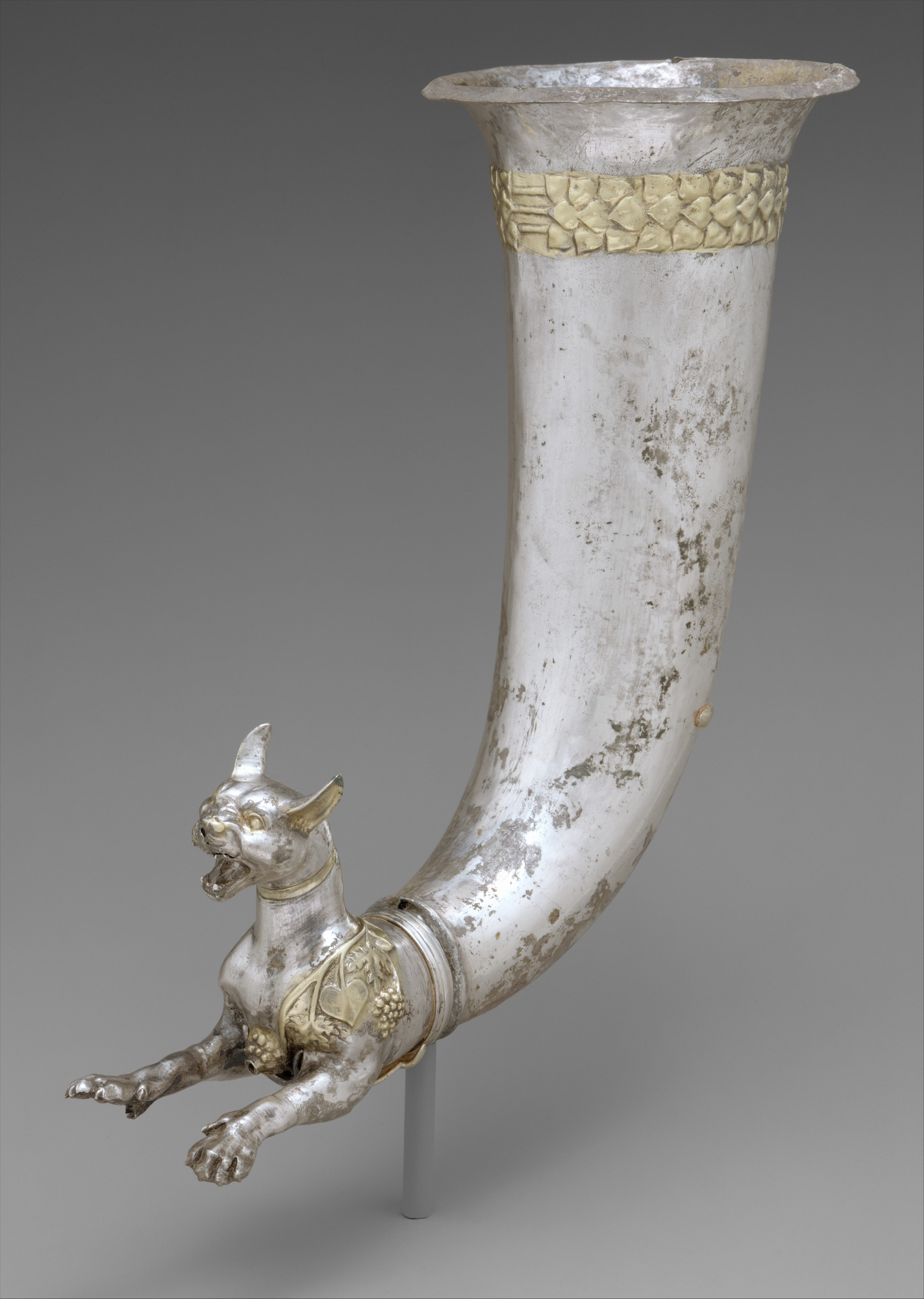
Rhyton, gilt silver, Parthian, Metropolitan Museum of Art

Archaeological silver objects are particularly sensitive to mistakes in planning or carrying out conservation restoration. The essential problem connected with archaeological silver objects is brittleness. Certain objects, such as those that are completely mineralized, nielloed, or gilt, are particularly problematic. When dealing with archaeological objects, reversible processes, such as the use of Paraloid B-72 glue, are preferred to permanent treatments.

Benzotriazole can be used as corrosion inhibitor for archaeological importance. Suitable protective coatings include Paraloid B-72 (or Paraloid B 67 – soluble in white spirit) and Renaissance Wax.

== See also ==
- Conservation and restoration of outdoor bronze objects
- Conservation and restoration of metals
- Conservation and restoration of copper-based objects
- Conservation and restoration of ferrous objects
- Conservation and restoration of glass objects
- Conservation and restoration of ivory objects
- Conservation and restoration of ceramic objects
