= Conservation and restoration of ivory objects =

Preservation of heritage collections

The conservation and restoration of ivory objects is the process of maintaining and preserving objects that are ivory or include ivory material. Conservation and restoration are aimed at preserving the ivory material and physical form along with the objects condition and treatment documentation. Activities dedicated to the preservation of ivory objects include preventing agents of deterioration that specifically connect with ivory as a material, preventative conservation, and treatment of ivory objects. Conservators, curators, collections managers, and other museum personnel are in charge of taking the necessary measurements to ensure that ivory objects are well maintained and will make the decision for any conservation and restoration of the objects.

Ivory as a material is the tusk or teeth from animals and is soft and malleable with nonmetal tools. Often used in decorative and practical objects, ivory can be inlaid and used as an accent within objects made from other material like metal and wood. A popular decorative ivory work is scrimshaw, which is etched ivory with black or colored pigments. Ivory has been manipulated since prehistoric times and as a material has been used in religion, as jewelry, piano keys, decorative arts, and other products. The demand for ivory has caused specific animals to become endangered, including the African and Asian Elephant. Ivory is a coveted material throughout Europe, Africa, and Asia that is illustrated in religious objects, art, and demonstrates wealth. In the last thirty years, ivory has been mainly been used in the jewelry and souvenirs markets.

== Ivory ==
Ivory is the tusks and unusually large or projected teeth of animals, such as elephants and walruses. It consists of dentin and made up of both organic (for growth and repair) and inorganic (rigidity and strength) components. Due to it being organic and inorganic the ivory is extremely sensitive and reactive

=== Types of ivory ===
Understanding the diverse types of ivory is important as it can impact the type of conservation and restoration work that is done. It can also determine the materials that are harmful or safe to use on the ivory.

==== Elephant and mammoth ====
Elephant and mammoth ivory comes from the two modified upper incisors. Tusks of some male African elephants can grow up to 2 meters (6 ½ feet) and weigh up to 45 kilograms (100 pounds). The tusks have a pulp cavity where the root and soft tissues attach to the jaw and that extends for approximately one-third of the tusk. By looking at if the carved ivory does or does not have the pulp cavity it can help indicate what part of the tusk was used and its original length.

The characteristic identifier in elephant ivory is the pattern of intersecting arcs that can be seen in the cross-section. These arcs can go by several names such as engine turnings, cross-hatchings, or Schreger lines (named after the German anatomist who first described them in 1800). The intersections of the lines form angles, obtuse arc angles are found in elephant ivory and acute arc angles are found in mammoth ivory.

==== Walrus ====
Walrus ivory is solid its entire length with a center of secondary dentin instead of a pulp cavity. It is characterized in cross section by the central core that has a marbled appearance surrounded by the smooth creamy white dentin layer. They may grow up to 1.0 meter (3 ¼ feet) in length.

==== Warthog ====
Warthog ivory comes from their upper and lower canine teeth and are strongly curved. It generally has squared cross sections and have a mottled appearance. When using a magnifying hand lens, the wart hog dentin shows irregularly spaced concentric lines with varying thickness.

==== Narwhal ====
Narwhal ivory comes from a single left incisor that is produced by males. It is distinguished by its spiral form. They can grow 2.0–7.0 meters (6 ½–23 feet) in length.

==== Hippopotamus ====
The upper and lower canine and incisors are the most common sources for hippopotamus ivory and each one has a distinctive gross morphology. Using a magnifying hand lens, we can see tightly packed series of fine concentric lines, which can be regularly or irregularly spaced. The orientation of these lines will follow with the overall shape of the tooth. Hippo ivory is harder and opaquer than elephant or walrus ivory.

The upper canines are curved and are oval to rounded in the cross-section. The lower canines are the largest teeth and strongly curved. In their cross-section, they are triangular. The incisors can be described as peg shaped and the center of the tooth in the cross-section shows a small dot.

==== Sperm whale and killer whale ====
Both the sperm whale and killer whale have conically shaped teeth with a small amount of enamel at the tips and the rest of the tooth covered by cementum. The cross-sections of the teeth are rounded or oval. A characteristic feature is that the dentin forms in layers that alternate directions giving it a banded appearance. Their teeth are second in hardness to hippopotamus ivory. Sperm whale teeth may grow up to 20 cm (8 inches) in length while the killer whale teeth are slightly smaller. Killer whale teeth show two slight peripheral indentations and may also display a faint rosette pattern in the dentin cross-section.

==== French ivory ====
French ivory is a synthetic material that is typically composed of pigmented cellulose nitrate and/or casein. This type of ivory was commonly made in the late 19th century and early 20th century. It looks like elephant ivory and can have intersecting line patterns but the pattern is more uniform and regular than natural ivory. This ivory will be occasionally marked synthetic while "French Ivory" or "India Ivory" are common marks. It can be distinguished from natural ivory due to its lighter weight and more even coloring.

Cellulose nitrate can be identified with a chemical spot test using diphenylamine. This ivory can degrade and produce acidic and oxidizing nitrogen. Oxide gases have been known to spontaneously combust so if this type of ivory shows any deterioration it must be kept away from the rest of the collection.

==== Vegetable ivory (ivory nuts) ====
Vegetable ivory is derived from several dense palm nuts that are native to Africa, South America, and the South Pacific. It is a cellulosic material. They grow to a maximum of 5 cm (approximately 2 inches) in diameter.

==== Composite mixtures ====
Can be various mixtures including ivory dust and casein, ivory dust and styrene resin, calcium carbonate and adhesive, casein and hardener.

==== Plastic ====
A proprietary plastic of cellulose nitrate and camphor that was developed in the mid-19th century as an ivory substitute. Other examples include polyester and phenolic resins. The plastics are sometimes laminated to show a striated surface to resembles ivory but ivory's intersecting arc pattern cannot be reproduced.

== Agents of deterioration ==
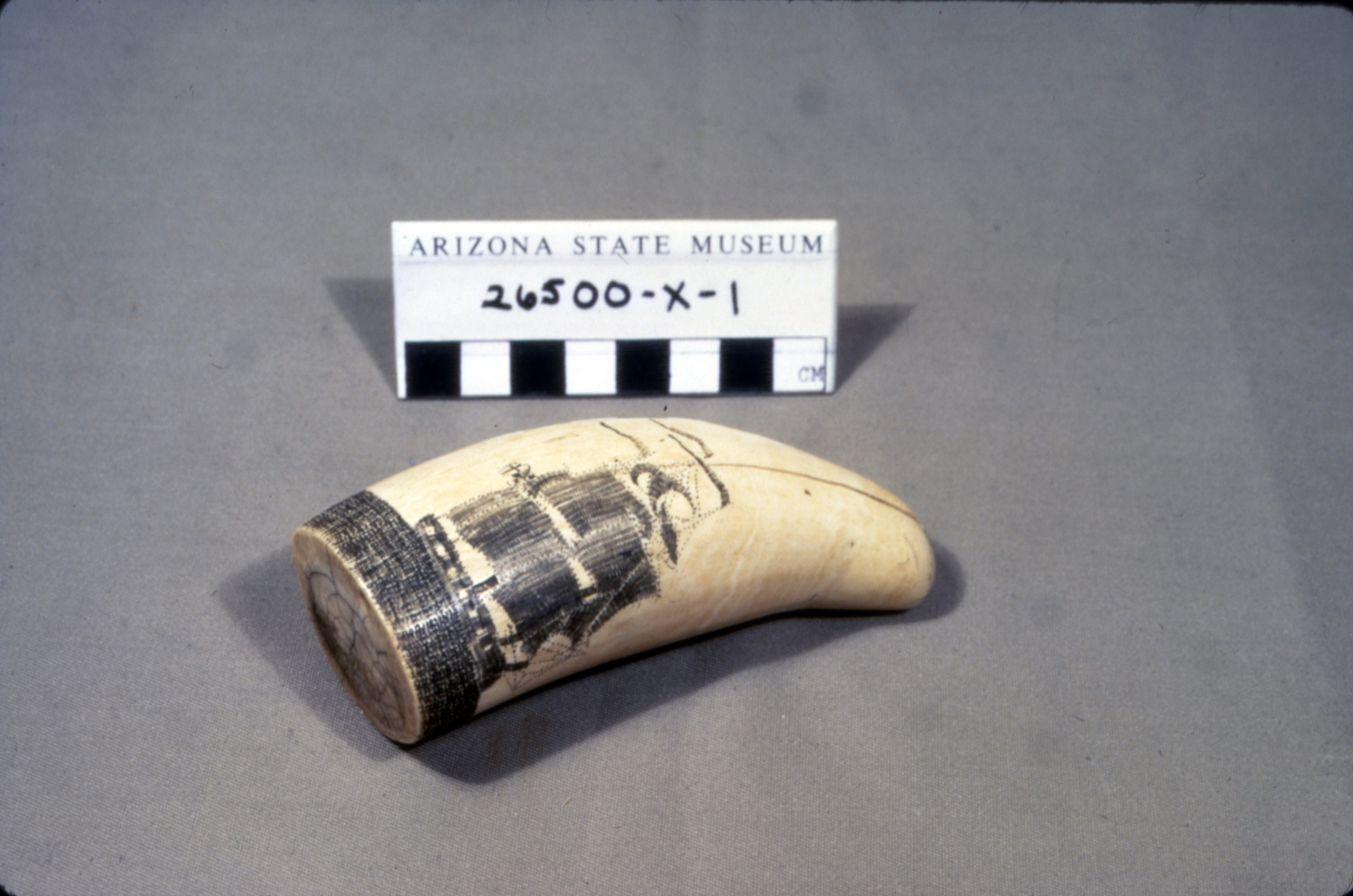
Whale tooth, Scrimshaw. Split due to damage from humidity

Ivory is susceptible to certain challenges to their preservation. In order to protect against damage, conservators should determine the agents that threaten its material make-up. The agents of deterioration include the following:

Physical forces

Ivory is very fragile and susceptible to cracking, chipping and breakage. Ivory is porous, brittle, and prone to impact damage and delamination. This can be caused by human error such as dropping, bumping, or mishandling. It can also result from improper display and storage such as unstable shelving or lack of padding.

Fire

A special caution applies to French Ivory. Because it is usually composed of cellulose nitrate, it is potentially flammable and must be kept away from heat or other sources of ignition.

Pests

Bone, ivory, and antler are rarely attacked by insects, but horn is often seriously damaged by the larvae of carpet beetles and clothes moths.

Light, ultraviolet, and infrared

Ivory, bone, and antler should be kept away from bright light such as spotlights or direct sunlight. Bright light can increase the surface temperature of the object. When exposed to light, ivory can become stained or bleached, and ultraviolet light can cause it to yellow.

Incorrect relative humidity

Ivory is hygroscopic and anisotropic which means it absorbs or releases moisture with changing humidity. Ivory tends to shrink, swell, crack, split, and/or warp on exposure to extremes or fluctuations in relative humidity and temperature. Low relative humidity causes desiccation, shrinkage and cracking, while high relative humidity can cause warping and swelling.

Thieves and vandals

Ivory objects may have come from illegal trade, so it is important to know what type of ivory the object is made from and its provenance.

Water

The organic components in ivory is called ossein, which is decomposed by hydrolysis and after long-term exposure can cause the ivory to turn into a sponge-like substance. Even for cleaning purposes, water can damage ivory so it should be avoided.

Pollutants

Corroded metals and colored materials can stain ivory and should not be placed near them. Dust can be removed from ivory using a soft brush.

Incorrect temperature

Although ivory is most susceptible to fluctuation in relative humidity, it should be kept at a stable temperature that does not exceed 25 °C (77 °F). Ivory will warp in high temperatures, therefore extreme conditions in temperature should be avoided.

Disassociation

Disassociation is the result of losing an object or object-related data. Attempting to remove the ivory's patina or attempting to clean or repair an ivory object that is in poor condition can cause damage and lead to the loss of valuable information on the object's origins or production method.

== Preventive conservation ==
=== Handling ===
When working with ivory objects it is important to wear white cotton gloves and if none are available be sure to thoroughly wash hands prior to touching the object. Since ivory is a porous material it is susceptible to staining. Ivory will yellow and/or brown with repeated contact to skin, fatty acids, and oils.

=== Temperature and relative humidity ===
Ivory is a hygroscopic material meaning that is absorbs and releases moisture with changing humidity. It is very reactive to its environment with the most severe changes linking to temperature and relative humidity. The relative humidity ideally is between 45–55% and the temperature at 70 °F (21 °C). If the relative humidity is too low it can lead to desiccation, shrinkage, and cracking. When the relative humidity it too high is can cause warping and swelling of the ivory. If the relative humidity exceeds 60% for a sustained time there is a chance that mold can develop on the ivory. It will be a white and greenish fuzzy growth that will require particular care and cleaning.

Research has found that temperature does not have as great of an impact on the condition of ivory that relative humidity does. Big fluctuations with either temperature of relative humidity is harmful. When the temperature fluctuates from normal to high heat it will cause expansion and contraction of the ivory. Elevated temperatures can also result in a series of color changes.

=== Lighting ===
Sunlight and artificial light can damage the surface of the ivory by discoloring (patina) as well as make it more brittle. Sunlit or spotlight display cases as well as any closed cases where heat can build up from interior light bulbs will cause further damage ivory. Dark storage areas will help to prevent damage to the ivory objects.

Lighting is kept at 5 foot-candles

=== Integrated pest management ===
Ivory is very rarely attacked by insects but benefits from being routinely inspected to ensure no pest activity. Rodents or other small mammals can cause structural damage by chewing on the surface of ivory. By maintaining good housekeeping and having an integrated pest management program will help prevent infestations.

=== Proper storage ===
Tightly closed display cases or storage will provide protection from any sudden changes in temperature, relative humidity, dirt, and dust. Storage drawers lined with a chemically stable cushioning material, for example polyethylene or polypropylene will protect the surface of the ivory. Another option for storage is wrapping it in unbuffered, acid free tissue paper and stored in a sealed polyethylene bag. Well washed unbleached muslin or dipper fabrication can substitute the tissue. Avoid rubber based materials as it can cause unnatural yellowing of ivory. Avoid storing or displaying ivory near radiators, heat pipes, outside windows, and incandescent lights as they can cause excessive drying and temperature fluctuations.

== Conservation and restoration ==
=== Cleaning ===
If the ivory object is in good stable condition, cleaning the surface of dirt and grime is appropriate.

If the dusting is not enough the ivory can be cleaned with a mixture of water and mild soap (such as Ivory Snow or WA Paste). Never soak ivory as the water could cause the dirt to become more visible by embedding it into cracks or pores.

Many liquids can be destructive to ivory so avoid if possible or contact a professional.

=== Stabilization and structural treatments ===
Avoid over the counter adhesives when repairing cracks or breaks of ivory. These repairs are difficult and the use of poor adhesives can result in staining of the ivory and embrittlement as the adhesives age.

Breaks and cracks can be important historically and show its use of the object. Unnecessary repairs can result in the loss of that historical information. Contact a conservator before any structural repairs are made.

=== Surface treatments ===
Avoid wax or other protective coatings as they can age over time resulting in yellowing or darkening of the ivory surface. It can also obscure surface details that may be important to the object. The protective coatings can become difficult or even impossible to remove without damage to the object.

If possible to remove unstable surface treatments, do so with appropriate solvents. Use caution and have a professional consulted before doing any work on the ivory. Almond oil is recommended by some conservationists, but it may eventually cause staining.

=== Intervention ===
Especially in archaeological contexts, interventive treatment may in some cases be considered necessary. Such intervention is governed by conservation ethics, in particular the principles of reversibility and minimum intervention. Possible treatments include the reduction of salts to prevent further deterioration, and the consolidation of delaminating and friable components. Any treatment should be undertaken by a conservation professional.

=== Identifying ivory and previous treatments ===
==== Visual examination ====
Visual examination is a very useful method to identify ivory. By using the characteristics of the variety of ivories listed about in addition to images and samples often they type of ivory can be identified. It is helpful to consider the size of the object, if it is a long and uninterrupted section it is may be elephant or mammoth. The weight is another indicator as ivory and bone are heavier than shell, horn, plastics, and composite mixtures.

==== Ultraviolet examination ====
By using ultraviolet light, it will help determine if the material is ivory or made from another material in a non-destructive way. The long wave ultraviolet light will fluoresce assorted colors or absorb the light which will help characterize the material. Ivory will fluoresce a bluish-white color as does bone and shell. Vegetable ivory will fluoresce a slightly orange color and the plastic ivory will absorb the light making it appear dull blue or matte.

Ultraviolet light can also be used to see previous conservation materials and work done on the ivory along with possible pigmentation.

==== Fourier Transform Infrared Spectroscopy ====
"Fourier Transform Infrared Spectroscopy (FTIR) is an analytical method that characterizes organic material based on the energy emitted by the bonds of specific chemical compounds comprising the composition of a sample when submitted to infrared radiation."

FTIR can differentiate ivory from other materials, except bone, as they have a similar chemical composition. It can also help identify the chemical composition of any pigments used on the ivory along with the previous mixtures and materials used for conservation or restoration of the object.

==== X-Radiography ====
X-ray can be used to look at the type of ivory it could be, if there are two separate pieces of ivory attached to each other, if there are nails/screws holding them together either from its original creators or for restoration work.

==== DNA analysis ====
DNA analysis is a more precise method of identification as it can identify if it is an African or Asian elephant and even specific areas from within a country that the ivory may belong to. This method requires a small sample of ivory where the mitochondrial and microsatellite DNA can be isolated and compared.

== Ethical concerns ==
With the dramatic decline in population for African and Asian elephants along with poaching there are certain laws and regulations for ivory.

=== Laws ===
See also, Ivory trade.

- The Lacey Act (1900 and later amendments) prohibits the trade of wildlife that is taken in violation of any state or foreign wildlife law or regulations. This affects interstate commerce.
- The Endangered Species Act (1973) is to help prevent the extinction of native and foreign species. It prohibits elephant parts and products from being imported into the United States except under certain conditions. Artifacts that are carved from elephant ivory may travel legally if it has documentation that proves its provenance predates 1973.
- Convention on International Trade in Endangered Species of Wild Fauna and Flora (CITES) is made up of 180 countries to eliminate the illegal trade in animals, their parts, and associated products. CITES regulations do not take place of national laws. CITES has an Ivory Control System that is focused on the ivory trade.
- The African Elephant Conservation Act (1988) prohibits raw or worked ivory to be imported into the United States with some exceptions. It also established a grant program that funds elephant conservation work.

=== Transportation regulations ===
As of 2016, new regulations in the United States have been put into place regarding African-elephant Ivory and Asian-elephant Ivory. It is important to understand not only the federal laws but the state laws as well, as they can differ.

==== African elephant ivory ====
===== Import =====
Commercial Purposes: It is now illegal to import African elephant ivory (raw, worked, antique, or brand new) into the United States for any commercial purpose.

Non-Commercial Purposes: If the ivory was removed from the wild prior to February 26, 1976 and was otherwise legally acquired then the following can be imported into the United States for non-commercial purposes.

- Musical instruments
- Items in a household move or that are part of an inheritance
- No more than two sport-hunted trophies per year (trophies must have appropriate permit that have been issued by the country hosting the hunt).

===== Sale and export =====
Commercial Purposes: To commercially export an item containing ivory it must qualify as an antique, as defined by the Endangered Species Act.

- The item has not been repaired or modified with ivory, or any other part of a federally protected species since 1973
- The item is at least 100 years old
- The item was either imported prior to 1982 or after 1982 through one of the 13 ports specifically designated for antiques. Or the item was manufactured in the United States from legally imported ivory.

Non-commercial purposes: To be eligible it must be an antique as defined by the ESA, or it but have been created prior to 1979 and has not been bought or sold since that time. It is still illegal under federal law to export raw African elephant ivory for any purpose (commercial or non-commercial)

Interstate commerce: To be eligible for legal sale across state lines it must satisfy the laws of the relevant states and either be an antique as defined by the ESA or it must have been legally important into the United States prior to 1990 and contain only a small amount of ivory (de minimis exception).

Intrastate commerce: Under federal law, it the item was legally imported before 1990 or was imported with a CITES pre-convention certificate it can be sold within a state, if it also complies with relevant state and local laws.

==== Asian elephant ivory ====
===== Import, export, and interstate commerce =====
It is legal if it meets the following criteria:

- The item has not been repaired or modified with ivory, or any other part of a federally protected species since 1973
- The item is at least 100 years old
- The item was either imported prior to 1982 or after 1982 through one of the 13 ports specifically designated for antiques. Or the item was manufactured in the United States from legally imported ivory.

===== Intrastate commerce =====
an antique ivory can be sold within a state only if it has documentation from CITES certifying that it was imported prior to 1975.

==== Traveling exhibition ====
Worked African elephant ivory can be imported as part of a traveling exhibition if the ivory was legally acquired before February 26, 1976, it has not been transferred from one person to another for financial gain or profit after February 25, 2014, the person/group qualifies for a CITES traveling exhibition certificate, the ivory is accompanied by the CITES traveling exhibition certificate or and equivalent documents that meets the requirements. Raw African elephant ivory cannot be imported as part of a traveling exhibition.

== See also ==
- Ivory carving
- Ivory trade
- Begram ivories
- Conservation and restoration of metals
- Conservation and restoration of copper-based objects
- Conservation and restoration of ferrous objects
- Conservation and restoration of glass objects
- Conservation and restoration of ceramic objects
- Conservation and restoration of silver objects
