= Paraloid B-72 =

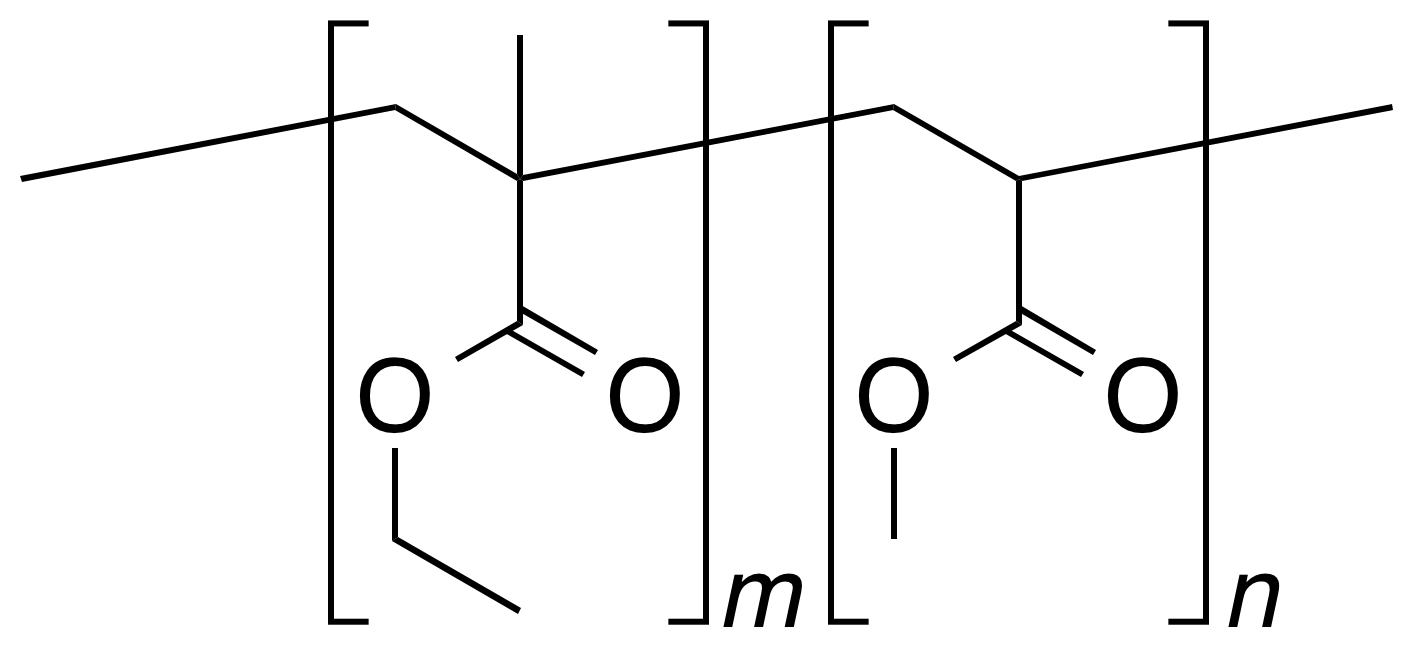

Names
- Other names B-72; Acryloid B-72 (obsolete)

Identifiers
ChemSpider	none

Properties
Density	9.6 lb gal^{−1} (1.15 g cm^{−3})

Hazards
Safety data sheet (SDS)	MSDS
- Except where otherwise noted, data are given for materials in their standard state (at 25 °C [77 °F], 100 kPa). Infobox references

Paraloid B-72 or B-72 is a thermoplastic resin that was created by Rohm and Haas for use as a surface coating and as a vehicle for flexographic ink. Subsequently, it has found popular use as an adhesive by conservator-restorers, specifically in the conservation and restoration of ceramic objects, glass objects, the preparation of fossils, and the hardening of piano hammers. It can also be used for labeling museum objects.

== Uses ==
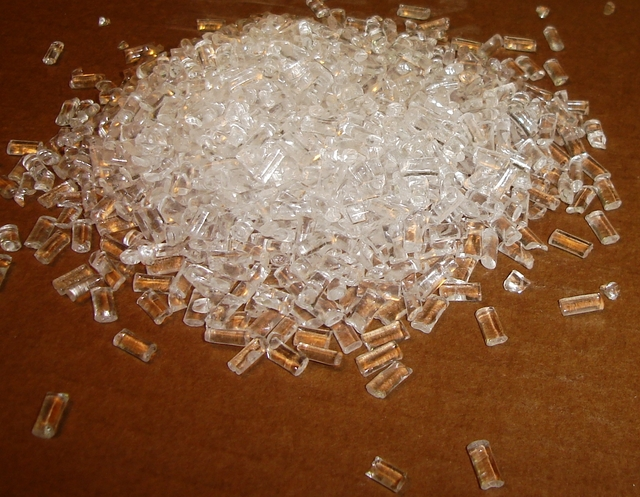
Paraloid B-72 in pellet form

B-72 is a durable and non-yellowing acrylic resin, which can be described chemically as an ethyl methacrylate–methyl acrylate copolymer. It is soluble in acetone, ethanol, toluene, and xylenes, among other solvents and solvent mixtures.

One of the major advantages of B-72 as a consolidant is that it is stronger and harder than polyvinyl acetate without being extremely brittle. This adhesive is more flexible than many of the other typically used adhesives and tolerates more stress and strain on a join than most others. The major drawbacks to using B-72 are related to its handling properties: as in the case of other acrylic resins it is difficult to apply as an adhesive and to manipulate with precision.

The most suitable solvent for B-72 is acetone. However, solvent mixtures with various proportions of acetone, ethanol, and toluene are frequently used to alter the working time of the resin and to produce slightly different properties (hardness and flexibility, e.g.) in the set resin. Unlike cellulose nitrate, B-72 does not need additives like plasticizers to stabilize its durability. Fumed colloidal silica can be added to help with the workability of the resin. Research shows that the silica better distributes the stress and strain that occurs during evaporation of a solvent and during the setting of the adhesive film.

Because of its transparency and versatility, conservators, led by Stephen Koob of the Corning Museum of Glass, have recently begun to use cast sheets of B-72 as a fill material in glass objects.
