= Conservation and restoration of ceramic objects =

Preservation of heritage collections

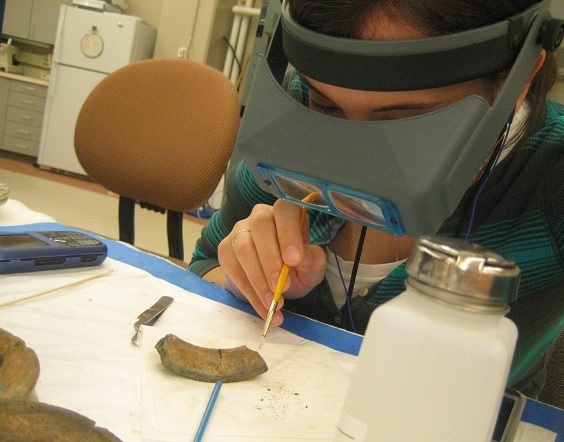
A museum technician applies acetone to a ceramic piece to remove a previous conservation adhesive of Duco glue. This object is from the collection of the Indiana State Museum.

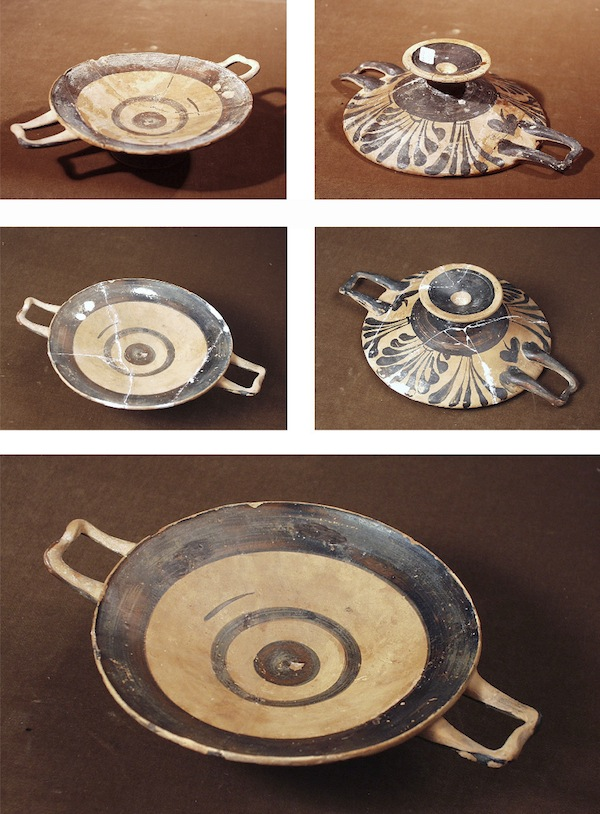
Kylix before and after conservation - restoration

Conservation and restoration of ceramic objects is a process dedicated to the preservation and protection of objects of historical and personal value made from ceramic. Typically, this activity of conservation-restoration is undertaken by a conservator-restorer, especially when dealing with an object of cultural heritage. Ceramics are created from a production of coatings of inorganic, nonmetallic materials using heating and cooling to create a glaze. These coatings are often permanent and sustainable for utilitarian and decorative purposes. The cleaning, handling, storage, and in general treatment of ceramics is consistent with that of glass because they are made of similar oxygen-rich components, such as silicates. In conservation ceramics are broken down into three groups: unfired clay, earthenware or terracotta, and stoneware and porcelain.

== Ceramic deterioration ==
Rodent damage to ceramic pottery

All materials used for construction eventually degrade and deteriorate. Degradation of an object occurs as a result of the interaction with the environment or with the materials that form the object; however, in the case of ceramics, environmental factors are the major cause. There are several ways in which ceramics break down physically and chemically.

Additionally, the type of ceramic will affect how it will break down. Unfired clay, like mud and clay adobe, is clay that is fired under 1000°C or 1832°F. This type of clay is water-soluble and unstable. Earthenware is clay that has been fired between 1000–1200°C or 1832°–2192°F. The firing makes the clay water insoluble but does not allow the formation of an extensive glassy or vitreous within the body. Although water-insoluble, the porous body of earthenware allows water to penetrate. A glaze can be applied that will protect the vessel from water. Due to its porosity, earthenware is susceptible to moisture and creates problems including cracks, breaks and mold growth. Porcelain and stoneware are fired at the highest temperatures between 1200–1400°C or 2192–2552°F. Porcelain clay mixtures are fired to create a non-porous and very hard surface. However, the materials also create a very brittle surface which increases the potential for chips, cracks and breaks.

=== Physical degradation ===
Due to their fragility, damage to ceramics typically comes from mishandling and packing. However, other factors, such as vandalism, frost, mold, and other similar occurrences, can also inflict harm.

==== Manufacturing defects ====
Also known as inherent vice, the intrinsic instability of the fabric and components of an object can lead to its own physical degradation. This is difficult to prevent because it occurs within the fabric of the material and therefore is a natural occurrence. Deterioration of an object can happen even before the object is used. How the piece is created can instill manufacturing defects in the piece. This means that objects can be damaged even before they are used. This would include a body that contains inadequate quantities of filler materials. A second typical defect is from poor design and construction. An example of this would be a ceramic piece with a handle too thin to support the weight of the cup. A third manufacturing defect is careless firing: a ceramic piece that has been fired too rapidly or allowed to dry unevenly will crack or break.

==== Impact and abrasion ====
With its delicate nature, ceramics that have been used over a period of time will sustain cracks, nicks, and blemishes. Additionally in a museum environment, damage can occur from packing, storing, and handling of objects.

==== Frost ====
Damage can occur when ceramics are exposed to freezing temperatures and frost. The problem occurs when ice crystals form inside of the pores of the ceramic piece. The frost inside of the pores will exert pressure onto the fabric of the pottery and cause the material to crack and break.

=== Mold growth ===
When humidity is high molds can begin to form on ceramic, particularly ones in which there is no glaze. Mold spores are found throughout the atmosphere and will attach to suitable substrates, including ceramics. Earthenware ceramics are frequently affected due to their porosity and lack of glaze.

=== Chemical degradation ===
Chemical degradation of objects occurs not in the physical structure of the object but rather at the chemical level. The degradation of the chemical constituents of an object will hinder or weaken the stability of the object when exposed to environmental factors such as water, air, pollution, heat, humidity, and the like.

==== Water ====
Water can dissolve or deform ceramics that have been low fired, i.e., at temperatures around 600°C. Ceramic fired at high temperatures may also have water-soluble mineral constituents, for example gypsum or calcite. Additionally, water may carry solutes that damage ceramics. For example, dissolved carbon dioxide increases the solubility of calcite by reacting to form calcium bicarbonate which is comparatively soluble. Stagnant water is less damaging because the carbon dioxide is not exhausted.

==== Soluble salts ====
Acoma ceramic pottery, spalling due to salt

A common degradation issue in ceramics involves soluble salts. Soluble salts can either enter the clay body from the environment, for example from being buried underground for decades, or they are already naturally occurring due to the components of the materials or clay used. Non-archaeological objects, such as modern dishware, can acquire salts from normal use such as storing salt. Soluble salts respond to changes in humidity both high and low. In high humidity salts become soluble and in low humidity they crystallize. The changing from soluble to crystallization and back damages the surface of the ceramic because salt crystals are larger than liquid salt and therefore will shrink and expand the ceramic body. A white haze on the surface is the first indication of soluble salts, which is the salt crystallizing. Over time, the physical component of the body will crumble until it is completely destroyed.

== Preventive care of ceramics ==
In the realm of conservation there are two distinct practices: non-interventive and active conservation. Non-interventive types of conservation are used to control the surrounding environment such as light, humidity, and temperature. Active conservation is when a conservator practices treatments to alleviate physical problems in the object such as fading, chipping, or breaks.

=== Display ===
Although ceramics are utilitarian, some pieces are made to be artwork and therefore displayed. Displaying an object improperly can cause damage either physical or chemically from the environment. One of the most common causes for damage is a ceramic piece falling over or off a shelf. To prevent this issue, many historic houses will line storage and display shelves with a thin layer of ethafoam (polyethylene foam) or bubble wrap.

=== Storage ===
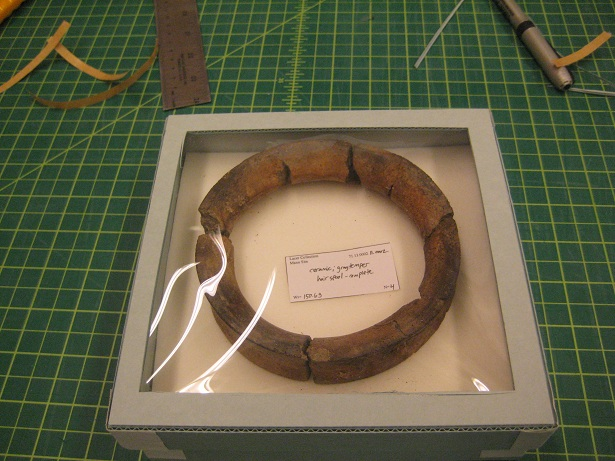
This ceramic ring is housed in a blue board box with an acrylic plastic lid. The ring is laid upon a layer of carved ethafoam to prevent it from shifting during handling.

Ceramics are very delicate in nature and damage can occur even when they are stored away. The most common way in which ceramics become damaged is when they are stacked one inside the other. Unless this is part of the original design, this will typically cause nicks, cracks, or breaks. Some ceramics, depending on their provenance, survive better in different temperature and humidity conditions. Pottery that has been buried, such as from an archaeological site, is better stored at a constant low humidity. This will help to keep any salts from efflorescing, a process which can mar the surface as well as remove the surface glaze.

In general ceramics are typically inert and are not sensitive to elevated light levels. However, extreme changes in temperature and humidity can cause chemical and physical damage. Typically, museums strive to store ceramics, as well as many other material types, in a stable temperature of 68 °F with ± 3°. Additionally relative humidity should be stabilized at 50% also with a ±5%. Storing objects near windows, heaters, fireplaces, and exterior walls can create an unstable environment with temperature and humidity fluctuation and increase potential for damage.

Some storing materials can be harmful to ceramic objects. Wool felt attracts and harbors insects including moths and silverfish which can be potentially very harmful to other collection material types. Polyurethane foam deteriorates over time, leaving a sticky and acidic by-product.

=== Handling ===
One of the rules in object handling is to treat every object as if it is fragile and easily breakable. Museum technicians, curators, and conservators are trained to prepare a moving plan before an object is even touched. A vessel, or any object, should be held and handled by its strongest part, such as the base, and with both hands. Areas such as the handle or neck of a vessel tend to be the weakest points and may break if picked up by these components.

== Removal of previous conservation actions ==
Damage also can occur to ceramics from previous restoration. Although the intent was to repair the object for use or display, some dated practices are now known to increase damage either physically, from rivets or staples, or chemically, from formerly used adhesives that off-gas.

=== Removal of surface coating ===
Overpaint is a technique that is used to cover imperfection on the surface of a ceramic piece. Differences can be seen to the naked eye due to discoloration, being matched poorly, and change in texture or gloss. Subtle difference can also be seen by restorers by using lighting and magnification. Overpaint and surface coatings can be removed either mechanically or with the use of solvents.

Mechanical removal of overpaint include physical techniques to remove the coating from the surface. On a glazed surface a sharp needle or scalpel can be used. If mechanical removal is not possible without damaging the surface, solvents can be used instead. The archetype solvents typically used are water, white spirit, industrial methylated spirits (denatured alcohol), acetone, and Dichloromethane which is usually found in the form of a commercial paint stripper. The appropriate solvent works by being applied to the ceramic surface by a cotton wool swab and is rolled on the surface rather than being wiped. Wiping the solvent on the surface will push the paint into the surface rather than lift it off.

=== Removal of filling materials ===
Fill materials are used to fill in missing parts or breaks in a ceramic piece in order to stabilize the piece. A wide range of materials and techniques have been used to restore losses in ceramics. Today the most common filling materials are made from calcium-sulphate-based fillers or synthetic resins such as epoxy, acrylic, or polyester resin. These new resins are stronger and do not harm the object. Removing previous filling materials, either mechanically or chemically, and replacing them with new fillers can help keep the piece strong and stable.

Fillers can be removed physically by mechanical ways, depending on the filler material type. Cement mortar can be chiselled away with a hammer and chisel gradually. Plaster is easily removed through mechanical methods such as chiselling and chipping away with sharp implements. Saws, drills, and other mechanical methods can be used to remove the bulk of protruding materials; however, scratches, chips, and breaks can occur.

Filler material can also be removed chemically. Typically, chemical removal is used once the bulk of filler material is left and only a small portion is left.

Unlike adhesives, fills tend to be easier to remove from ceramics. Plaster of Paris is one example of a fill that comes apart easily with warm.

=== Removal of adhesives ===
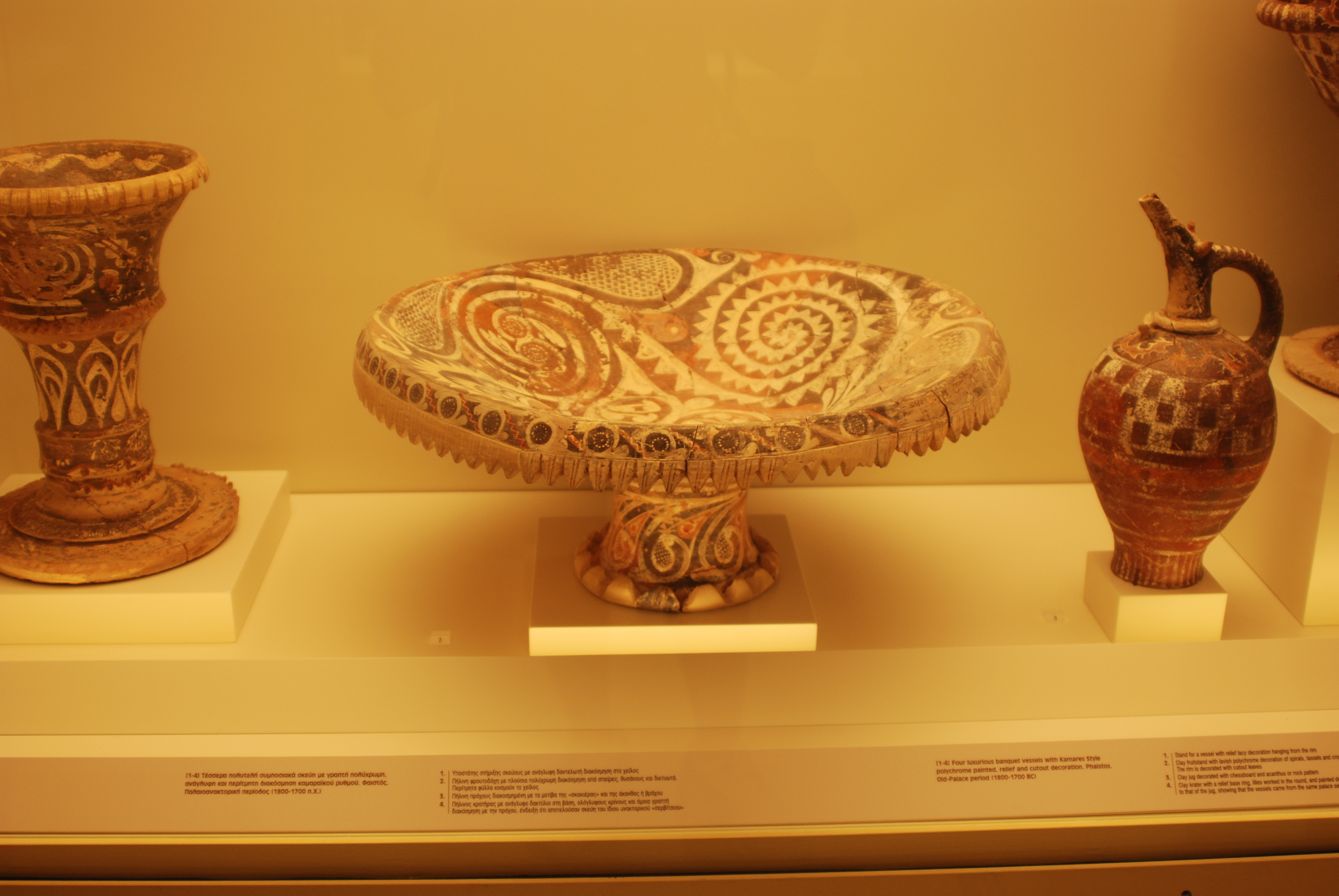
A Minoan ceramic piece from the Archaeological Museum of Herakleion that has gone under restoration

The selection for the proper solvent is based on the identification of the adhesive itself. Every adhesive has a particular solvent that work best to break down its chemical composition. Color, hardness, and other physical properties will allow for identification of the adhesive. The adhesive can be soften once exposed to the solvent, in either liquid or vapor form, for some time. The length of time depends on the solubility of the adhesive and the thickness of the joint. Porous bodies, low-fired clays, are sometimes pre-soaked in water to prevent the adhesive from being drawn back into the body once it joins with the removal solution. If the adhesive that is being removed is part of the support for the object, then supports, such as tissue paper or propping up the object, will be used to make sure the object does not sustain damage once the adhesive is removed. Insufficiently softened adhesive may take with it part of the ceramic surface when removed. The information on solvents for specific adhesives are found below, under each adhesive section.

== Cleaning ==
Removal of surface dirt and deposits benefits the health and longevity of an object by preventing the dirt from being drawn into the body. Dust and grease may be held on the surface loosely by electrostatic forces or weak chemical bonds and are easily removed. Some deposits, such as calcium salts, can be strongly adhered to a ceramic surface, especially if the surface is unglazed. There are two main methods in which ceramics are cleaned and treated: mechanically and chemically.

Not all ceramic pieces are dry when they need cleaning. Some ceramics, such as those that are excavated archaeologically, will be damp or wet in nature. Conservators tend to remove the surface dirt before the object is completely dry. This is done because it is easier to do before the dirt hardens and because as it dried the dirt may shrink and cause physical damage to the ceramic surface. Some ceramics are kept damp until treatment can be completed.

=== Mechanical methods ===
Mechanical methods include dusting, picking and cutting, and abrading. Mechanical cleaning is typically much easier to control than chemical treatments and there is no danger of dirt being drawn into a solution and then absorbed by the ceramic. The danger of mechanical cleaning is the potential for the surface to break or become scratched with a tool. Dusting is used when dirt is not strongly adhered to the surface of the ceramic and is carried out by either a brush or a soft cloth. Large ceramic vessels are cleaned with a delicate vacuum cleaner with a soft, muslin-covered head. Picking and cutting is used when there is hardened dirt, encrustations, or old restoration materials closely adhering to the surface. Needles, sharp scalpels, other custom made tools, usually made from wood, and electric vibrotools are used. The dangers with these tools are the increase potential for scratches, gouges, cracking, and breaking of the object due to pressure.

Abrading is the process in which surface deposits are removed using abrasives. Abrasives come in both solid and cream forms. Solid forms of abrasives include glass-fiber brush or a rubber burr on a dental drill. Cream forms are usually attached to paper or film. Polishing creams are commonly used to remove thin layers of insoluble surface deposits such as calcium. These creams can also remove surface dirt and marks made by tools. The best creams of ceramic do not have oil, grease, or bleach as additives and are used only on glazed ceramics.

=== Chemical methods ===
Chemical methods for cleaning ceramics involve water, solvents, acids, and alkalis. Prolonged soaking in water may be used as a conservation method. The goal is to either remove stains from the surface or to remove the soluble salts in the clay body.

== Repair and restoration ==
The repair and restoration of ceramics has occurred since ceramics were invented including fillings, adhesives, reinforcements, and even patch work. The history of ceramic repair is vast and ranges from different methods and methodologies. For example, in 16th century China, people would repair broken ceramics by using pieces from other objects to disguise the patch. A sixteenth-century manuscript describes the process of patching broken ceramics:

16th century - "Old pieces of porcelain from any famous kiln such as censers lack ears or feet or if vases have damaged mouth rims one can use old bits to patch the old; and if one adds glaze and then bakes it is just the same as the old. But the colour is weak at the patch. Yet people prefer this to the new stuff. And if one uses the method of blowing the glaze on to the patched parts there is still less of a trace".

Today there are new advances in ceramic restoration including consolidation, bonding, adhesives, dowels, rivets, and fillers.

=== Consolidation ===
Consolidation is the process in which the fabric of the ceramic is strengthened by introducing a material into the fabric that will bind it together. The most common ceramics that need consolidation are excavated pieces because they tend to have lost their bonding fabrics due to leaching or absorption of soluble salts. A consolidant works in two ways: it either links to the particles in the ceramic chemically or it may form a support system mechanically without reacting with the fabric itself. Chemical consolidants that are used in modern conservation include isocyanates, silanes, siloxanes, and methyl methacrylates; however the consolidants that create a mechanical support system are used more frequently.

==== Adhesives ====
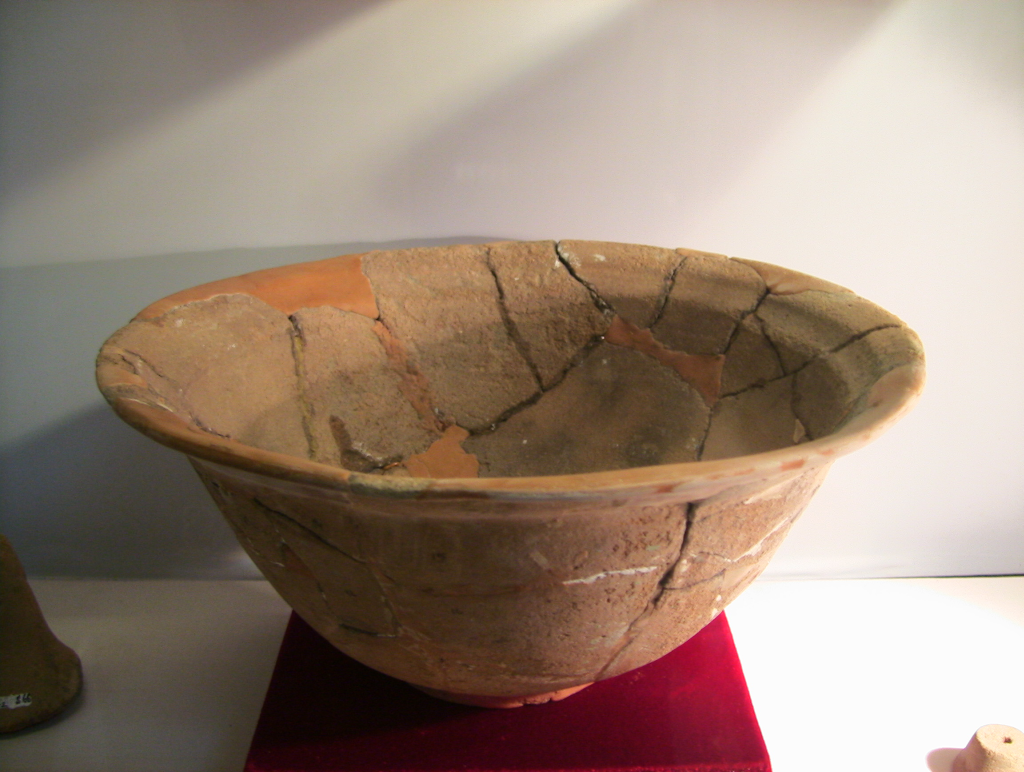
Repaired ceramic bowl from the National Museum of Vietnam History

A chemical compound that adheres or bonds items together, such as pieces of ceramic. In ceramic conservation there are several different types that range from natural to man-made adhesives. Conservators characterise the best adhesive as one which can be undone.

===== Animal glue =====
Animal glue is a widely used adhesive derived from animal parts such as bone or skin. It is a soft adhesive and can appear white, but usually has a pale yellow or brown appearance. Animal glue is very soft and can easily be broken down and removed with warm water and steam. Although easily reversible, the relative ease with which the glue breaks down makes it a less strong bonding method.

===== Shellac =====
A widely used old adhesive that is orange or very dark brown in appearance. Once dried, the adhesive is very hard and becomes increasingly more brittle over time. Shellac does not break down easily with commercially available products. Additionally, the resin has naturally occurring dyes that can stain ceramic pink or black. The solvent that works best on this resin is Industrial methylated spirit (IMA). Shellac is prepared by dissolving flakes of shellac in hot alcohol. The properties of shellac make it vulnerable to climatic conditions and inclined to deteriorate over time. Damage can even occur to shellac under the hot light of photography.

===== Epoxy resin =====
Epoxy resin is typically used post-1930s and is an indication of modern conservation work. Generally, epoxy is very hard, but unlike shellac it is not brittle. The color of epoxy resin can range from yellow/green to a dark yellow/brown. Yellowing of the resin is an indication of aging. Warm to hot water or acetone are known to be the solvents of this adhesive.

===== Rubber adhesives =====
Rubber cements are solutions of synthetic or natural rubber products in solvents, with or without resins and gums. Vulcanizers, accelerators, and stabilizers are considered problematic due to the nature of their compounds. One example is the additive of sulfur, which is harmful to some types of material, including silver, because it can cause discoloration. Rubber adhesives can be confused with epoxy resins due to their similar appearance. However, unlike epoxy resins, rubber adhesives will stretch when pulled. Nitromors or Polystrippa solvent brands are used as a solvent, but warm water can also loosen the bond.

===== Vinyl acetate polymers =====
Vinyl acetate polymers include polyvinyl acetate, polyvinyl alcohol and polyvinyl acetal; all come from reaction products of vinyl acetate. Some forms of acetates are known to be acidic and will do damage to an object with direct contact. Additionally, polyvinyl acetate mixtures tend to degrade in storage and release acetic acid, which in some cases can corrode lead. This compound's coloring ranges from clear/white to a soft yellow. As it ages, it will change to a deeper yellow. It can have a similar appearance to rubber adhesives, but the difference is that PVA turns white when comes into contact with water. Warm water and acetone are typically used as solvents.

===== Cellulose nitrate =====
There are early and modern forms of this adhesive. While both tend to tinge with yellow as they age, the early form tends to become more brittle than the modern version, which contains a plasticizer to make the compound more stable. As with many adhesives, acetone is generally used as a solvent, however IMS can also be used.

===== Paraloid B-72 =====
B-72 is a thermoplastic resin that was created by Rohm and Haas for use as a surface coating and as a vehicle for Flexographic ink. However B-72 is now being used more as an adhesive specifically for ceramic and glass. One of the major advantages of B-72 as a consolidate is that it is stronger and harder than polyvinyl acetate without being extremely brittle. This adhesive is more flexible than many of the other typically used adhesives and tolerates stress and strain on a join that most others can not. One major drawback to using B-72 is the difficulty of applying the acrylic resin as an adhesive, as is difficulty in manipulating the substance as a workable agent. The most suitable solvent for B-72 is acetone.

Unlike cellulose nitrate, B-72 does not need additives like plasticizers to stabilize its durability. Fumed colloidal silica is a chemical that can be added to help with the workability of the resin. Additionally research shows that the silica will better distribute stress and strain that occurs during evaporation of the solvent and during the setting of the adhesive film.

=== Dowels and rivets ===
Dowels and rivets are physical ways in which ceramics can be reinforced and strengthen beneath the surface. Dowels are cylindrical rods that consist of wood, metal, or plastic. They are drilled into the ceramic piece and usually are set in the hole with an adhesive that is used to repair the ceramic piece. Removing dowels can be hard because they lie under the surface and are usually hidden. Conservators will cut through dowels with a piercing saw and soften the area with a solvent, like acetone to remove two pieces of ceramic from one another.

Riveting is a process in which holes are drilled in the surface of the ceramic but does not go completely through the piece. The rivets are angled toward the joint and provide additional structural support. There are two methods to removing rivets: the 'cut' and 'pull'. The 'cut' method consists of cutting the rivets through the middle with a file and then pulled out. The 'pull' method involves placing a thin blade under the rivet and pushing out any plaster packing. This method uses leverage to pull the rivet from the ceramic piece.

=== Fillers ===
Fillers are used to replace gaps and losses from ceramic materials for either aesthetic reasons or for support. There are several different filler materials used in ceramics including plaster of Paris and other commercially available putties and fillers.

Plaster of Paris is a material that consists of calcium sulphate hemihydrate power and is produced by heating gypsum to 120 °C. The chemical formula is as follows: :CaSO_{4}·2H_{2}O + Heat → CaSO_{4}·½H_{2}O + 1½ H_{2}O (released as steam). When mixed with water, an exothermic reaction occurs and forms a hard white filling similar to density of fired ceramics. Different grades of plasters are available and vary based on their particle size, setting time, density, expansion, and color.

A thermoplastic synthetic wax resin mixture developed by John W Burke and Steve Colton in 1997 can be used to compensate losses in objects from translucent materials such as alabaster, marble, calcite, diorite, and anhydrite. The mixture consists of polyvinyl acetate (PVAC) AYAC, ethylene acrylic acid (EAA) copolymers A-C 540, and 580, antioxidants Irganox 1076 or 1035, dry pigments, marble powder, and other additives which were all melted together. This wax resin is a better substitute to wax-resins because wax collects dust and dirt and make the fill noticeable. Polyester resin and epoxies are toxic and noxious. The wax-resin is fast and easy to use, making it a possible new alternative to fill materials in the conservation field. The wax-resin works best on losses that allow for large contact with the original, primed surface and on losses that are thicker than 1/16in. Shallow losses and small gaps are more difficult due to the ease in which the fill is pulled out.

== Education and training ==
In France, conservators specialized in earthenware and glassware are trained at the Institut National du Patrimoine (The National Institute of Cultural Heritage). Their mission is to intervene when heritage resources are threatened or deteriorated for several reasons. The conservator prevents works of art from disappearing or loses its purpose whilst analyzing the complex stage of its material history and the cause of alteration.

== See also ==
- Conservation and restoration of metals
- Conservation and restoration of copper-based objects
- Conservation and restoration of ferrous objects
- Conservation and restoration of glass objects
- Conservation and restoration of ivory objects
- Conservation and restoration of silver objects
