= Conservation and restoration of glass objects =

Activity to extend the life of historical objects

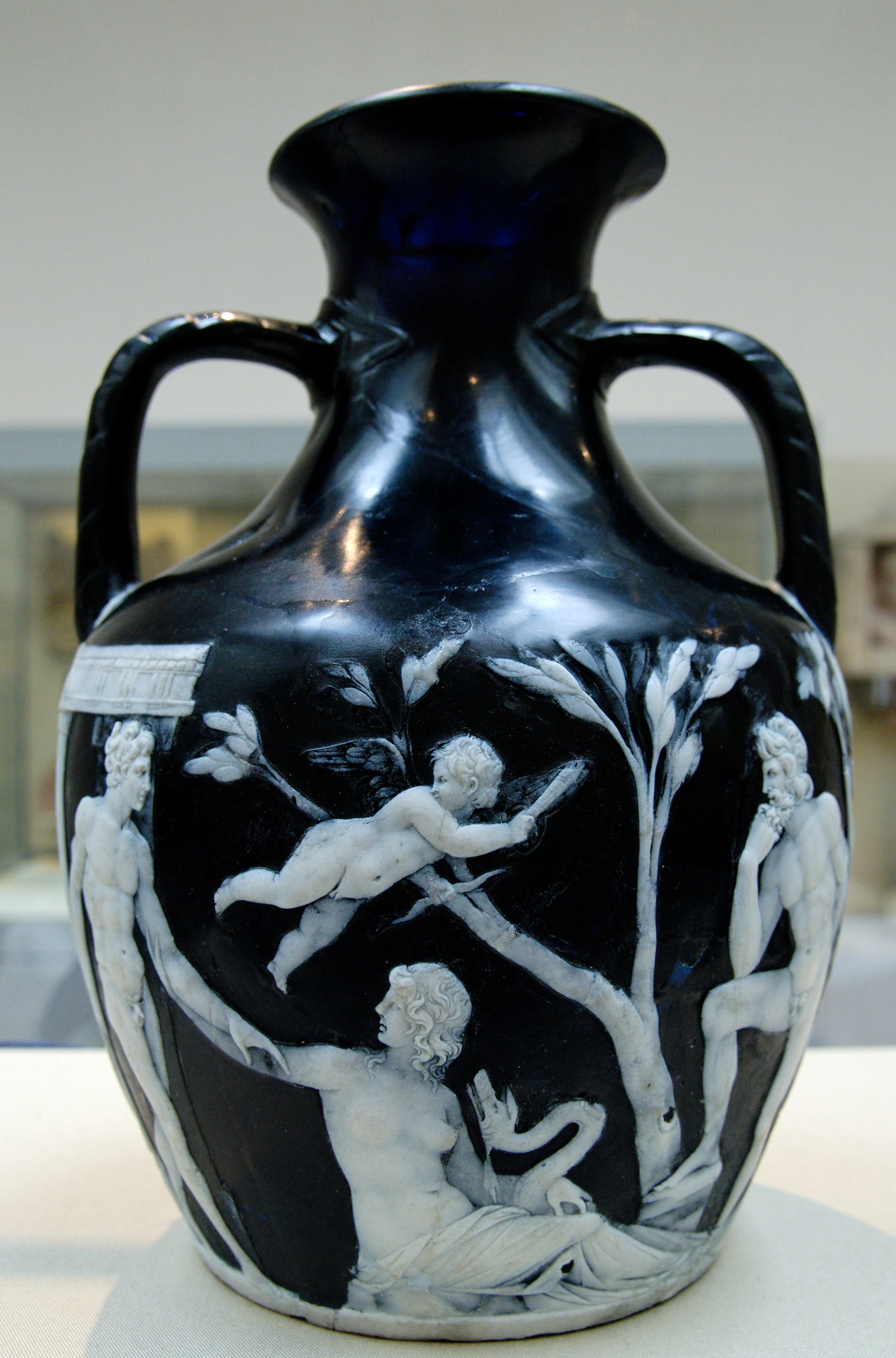
Portland Vase, British Museum, restored by Nigel Williams

Conservation and restoration of glass objects is one aspect of conservation and restoration of cultural heritage. The nature and varying composition of the material, and the variety of types of object made from it, demand certain specialized techniques. The conservator needs to be aware of "agents of deterioration" presenting particular risk to glass objects, and how to prevent or counteract their effects. Relevant education and training is available in certain countries through museums, conservation institutes and universities.

== The practice of conservation-restoration ==
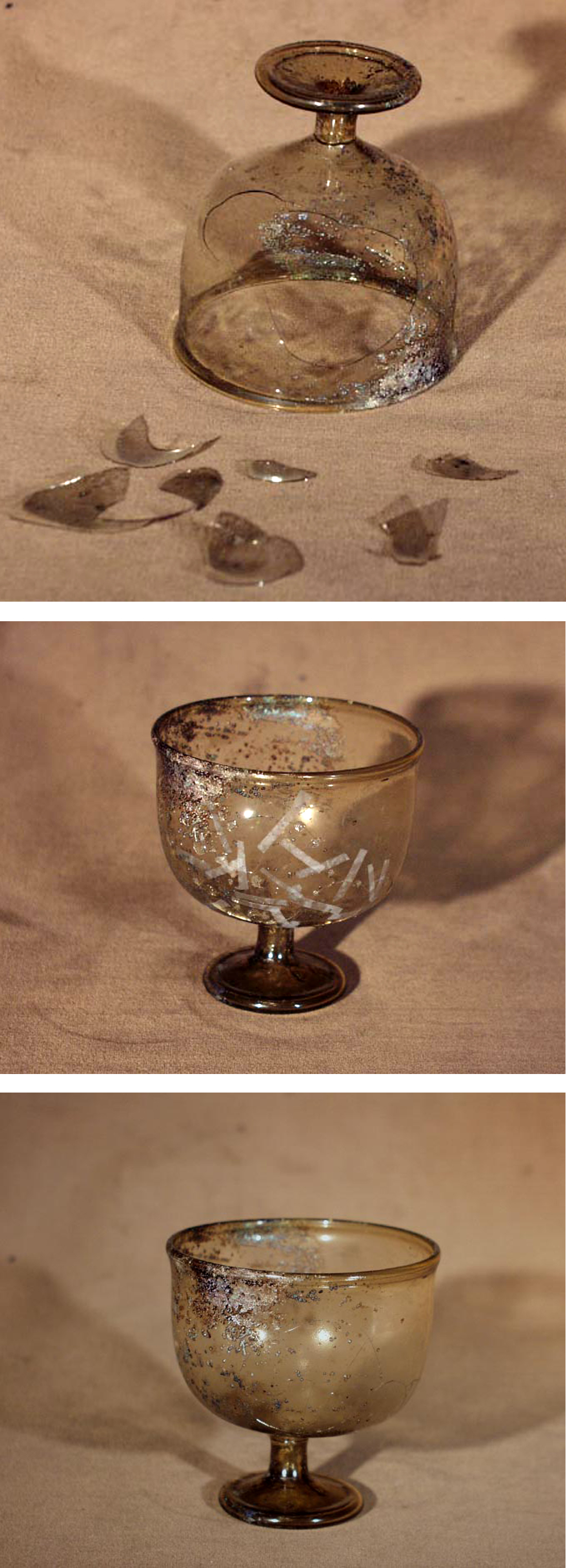
Roman Brown Glass during and after conservation - restoration

Conservation-restoration is the practice of cleaning and discovering the original state of an object, investigating the proper treatments and applying those treatments to restore the object to its original state without permanently altering the object, and then preserving the object to prevent further deterioration for generations to come (Caple, p. 5-6). It can involve many different people from various backgrounds to properly assess and treat an object, such as museum curators, conservators, scientists, and historians. The Metropolitan Museum of Art concludes that "conservators and scientists examine objects in the Museum's collections and those being considered for acquisition to determine their methods of manufacture and chemical compositions, as well as any damage or deterioration they may have undergone... conservators may then perform treatments, such as cleaning, repair, and restoration. They also recommend appropriate conditions for the storage, exhibition, and transportation of objects" (Pilosi and Wypyski, p. 66). Conservator-restorers can be found in museums, private for hire institutions, conservation associations, and government or state organizations. They not only treat glass objects, but also art, metal, ceramics, wood, and various other materials that are in need of preservation.

== Historic methods of glass cleaning ==
Glass has been around since the Egyptian XVIII Dynasty, as the very earliest specimen is a glass bead that has been dated to that time during the reign of Queen Hatshepsut. Glass is very versatile, and there many different types of glass that serve various purposes, such as stained-glass windows, table glassware, and even glass photographic plates. This means that the treatment of these objects depends upon their uses and original purposes. Glass throughout the ages mostly consisted of glass drinking or eating vessels, and then evolved to be part of churches and housing in the form of window glass. According to the Victoria and Albert Museum, most glass is composed of silica (sand), alkali (usually soda or potash), an alkaline earth (lime) and a little waste glass. Other materials, such as lead and barium, could also be added to create a specialized effect in the finished product. Methods of cleaning have evolved from washing with water, to using special chemical cleansers especially made for glass, to even dismantling a large glass object, like a window, to be assessed and cleaned under a microscope in a lab. There was not a need to clean glass thoroughly until glass evolved as part of the 20th-century home, and it suddenly became important to keep glass windows clean and the common cleanser Windex came into the picture in the 1930s. For glass objects that are not window glass, the most common way of cleaning is by water if the glass object is intact and not super fragile. The Victoria and Albert Museum provides guidance about how to go about this way of cleaning. The methods of cleaning may differ if the glass is already damaged, extremely thin or fragile, or very old.

== Agents of deterioration ==
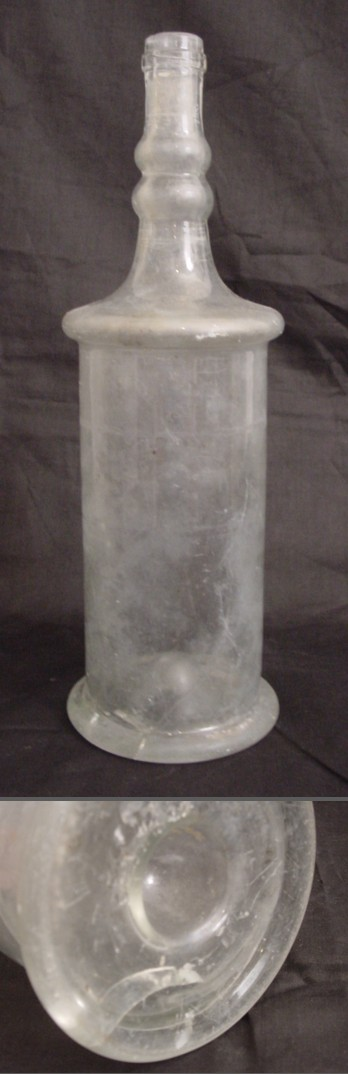
Glass disease

One of the ways in which preventive-conservators address the care of material collections is through assessing risk and needs based on the chief agents of deterioration. Best practices employ the system of "avoiding, blocking, detecting, and responding" to any address threats. By considering these key factors as potential problems with their own needs, stakeholders can make strides in safeguarding assets such as glass objects.

Physical forces to be considered in the preventive-conservation of glass objects can include: "impact, shock, vibration, pressure, abrasion", and may relate to the need to secure both the objects themselves as well as the environment in which they reside.

Fire is a means of deterioration that can impact glass objects ranging from a potentially minimal amount of damage to a total loss. Problems with fire include burning, soot deposits, and melting, warping, discoloration, embrittlement, cracking, and even shattering. Possible interventions to these consequences include creating and maintaining plans and that cover the installation of fire protection equipment and establishing procedures for emergency situations.

Pests, such as microorganisms, insects, rodents, birds, and bats, are agents of deterioration not as often associated with the problems that occur with glass objects. However, they can affect glass objects by proxy of other agents, like physical force, such as a bird that might fly into a stained-glass window, pollutants when a rodent that leaves a byproduct.

Light, ultraviolet and infrared radiation impact glass in unique ways. While visible light can cause colorful glass to fade, ultraviolet radiation is identified as a non-problematic entity. Infrared radiation does not have a direct effect but can be a cause of heating and therefore subject the glass to problems related to incorrect temperature (see below). The best way of protecting glass from radiation is to eliminate the source as best as possible. It is not always practical to keep a piece of glass out of sight, but strategic scheduling of exposure can reduce impact.

Incorrect temperature of glass objects can lead to possible fracture. Stabilization of temperature can help significantly in keeping them from destruction.

Incorrect relative humidity in glass objects can lead to crizzling or weeping of glass. Crizzling can occur when relative humidity is below 40%, and lead to cracks in its surface. Glass weeping or sweating can occur when relative humidity is above 55% and loses luster.

Thieves and vandals are a potential problem for any object. Since glass objects are generally fragile their susceptibility to vandalism might be preempted by a collections care plan that calls for them to be secured to a stable fixture. Here, the strategy is to "protect, detect, response, and recover" any possible losses.

Water itself is not a hazard to stable glass, but in the case of a piece with existing "glass disease", it can accelerate problems associated with it such as weeping, and crizzling as mentioned above. Here, glass should not be kept in places where the threat of water exposure could occur, such as low to the ground, or near places where water might pool.

Pollutants that are airborne or atmospheric pose less of a threat to glass. However, intrinsic pollutants might cause deterioration or degradation.

Dissociation is a threat for glass objects just as it might be for any other piece. Since glass objects can be small as well as large, they can be at a greater risk for being mishandled than something more obtrusive. Dissociation can cause problems that range from misplacement, to damage, to total loss. Good records keeping is always a best practice but proves to be one of the best strategies for addressing the threat of dissociation.

== Education and training ==
=== The United States ===
In the United States, the Corning Museum of Glass in New York is the institute for glass research through the conservation department and library. The conservation department advises on the best practices of displaying, mounting, lighting, storing, and handling glass objects. Additionally, the museum regularly holds courses on the principles and practice of historical and archaeological glass cleaning, care, conservation and restoration for conservators.

=== The United Kingdom ===
The Institute of Conservation in the United Kingdom works to conserve cultural heritage in the country with a group that specializes specifically in the care of ceramics and glass. Events hosted through the Institute include conferences and study days.

The University of York in England offers a Master's level program in Stained Glass Conservation within the Department of History of Art and in partnership with the Department of Archeology.

=== Portugal ===
The VICARTE – Vidro e Cerâmica para as Artes (Glass and Ceramic for the Arts) is a research unit composed of the Faculty of Sciences and Technology of the Universidade Nova de Lisboa and the Faculty of Fine Arts of the Universidade de Lisboa which works to further the research of glass and ceramics. In partnership with cultural heritage institutions across the country, they offer a Master's program in Glass and Ceramic Art and Science with an interdisciplinary approach to the coursework.

=== France ===
In France, the only academy where conservators and curators can receive training is at the Institut national du patrimoine (The National Institute of Cultural Heritage). A five-year training program for aspiring conservators is offered which grants students with a Master's in Conservation-Restoration, with specialties in earthenware and glassware.

== See also ==
- Conservation and restoration of metals
- Conservation and restoration of copper-based objects
- Conservation and restoration of ferrous objects
- Conservation and restoration of ivory objects
- Conservation and restoration of ceramic objects
- Conservation and restoration of silver objects
