= Oddy test =

The Oddy test is a procedure created at the British Museum by conservation scientist William Andrew Oddy in 1973, in order to test materials for safety in and around art objects. Often, materials for construction and museum contexts (including artefact conservation) are evaluated for safety. However, though materials may be safe for building purposes, they may emit trace amounts of chemicals that can harm art objects over time. Acids, formaldehyde, and other pollutants can damage and even destroy delicate artifacts if placed too close.

== Procedure ==
This test calls for a sample of the material in question to be placed in an airtight container with three coupons of different metals—silver, lead, and copper—that are not touching each other or the sample of the material. The container is sealed with a small amount of de-ionized water to maintain a high humidity, then heated at 60 degrees Celsius for 28 days. An identical container with three metal coupons acts as a control. If the metal coupons show no signs of corrosion, then the material is deemed suitable to be placed in and around art objects. The Oddy test is not a contact test, but is for testing off-gassing.

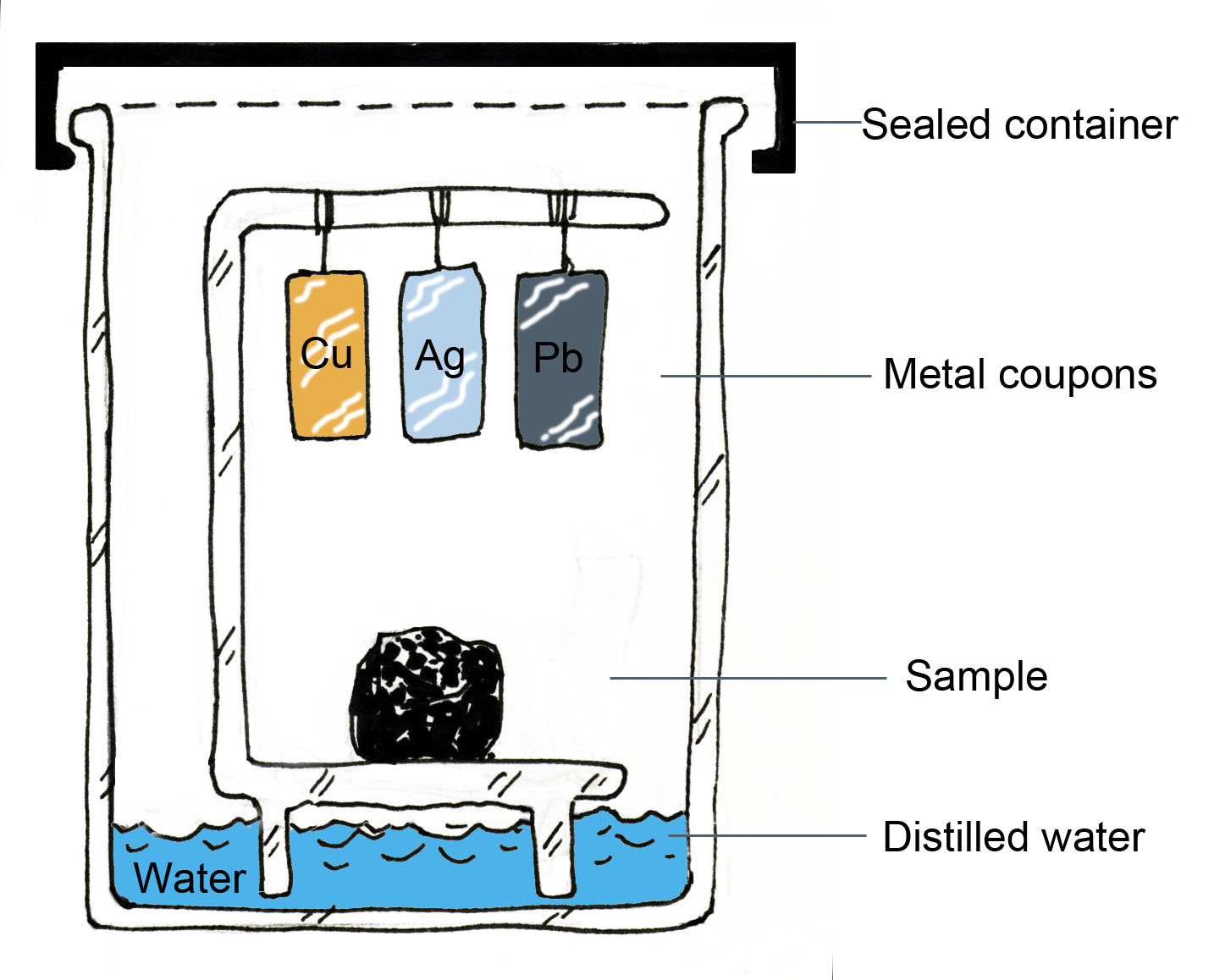
A basic layout of a three-in-one Oddy Test

Each metal detects a different set of corrosive agents. The silver is for detecting reduced sulfur compounds and carbonyl sulfides. The lead is for detecting organic acids, aldehyde, and acidic gases. The copper is for detecting chloride, oxide, and sulfur compounds.

There are many types of materials testing for other purposes, including chemical testing and physical testing.

== Development ==
The Oddy test has gone through many changes and refinements over time. Whereas Andrew Oddy proposed to place each metal coupon in a separate glass container with the material to be tested, Bamberger et al. proposed a "three-in-one" test, where all three metal coupons shared one container, simplifying the procedure. Robinett and Thickett (2003) refined the "three-in-one" test by stabilizing the metal coupons.

One of the main issues with the Oddy test is that there is some subjectivity to the interpretation of the results, since it is primarily a visual determination. Some proposals have been made to use objective quantification methods for assessment of the results of the Oddy test.

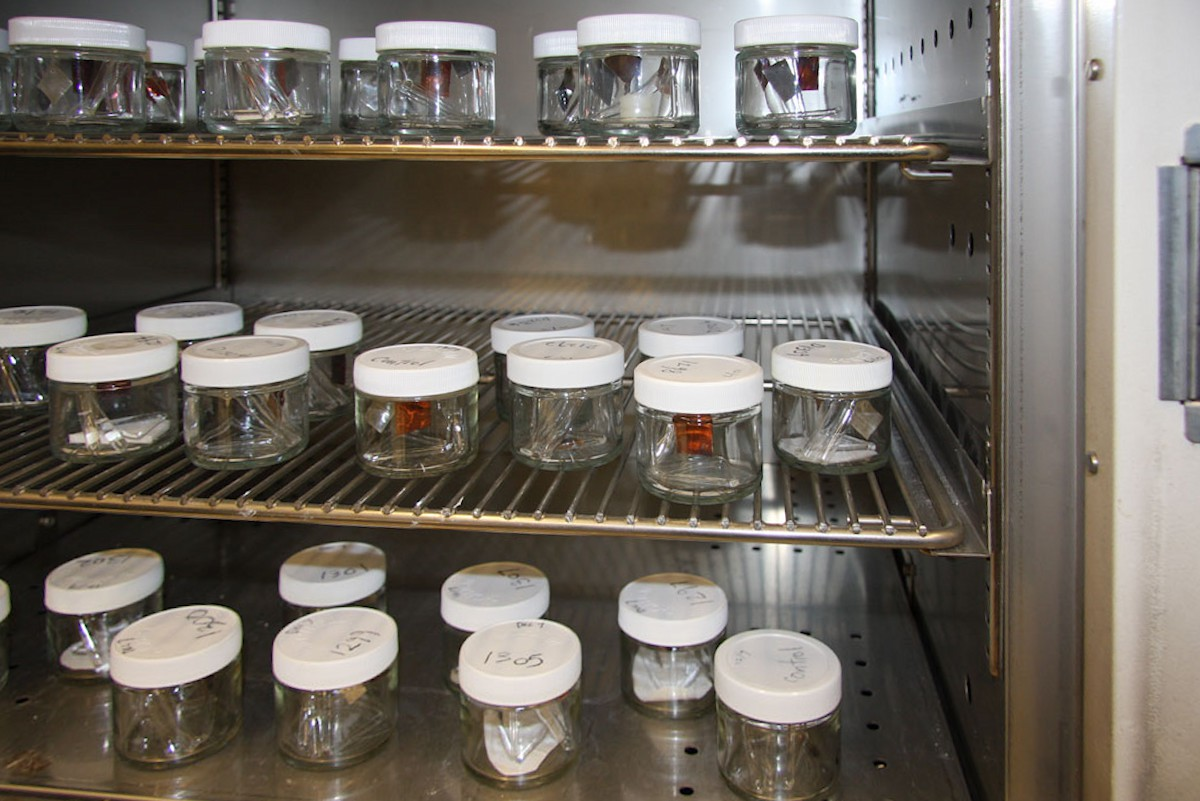
Oddy-tests 0823b

Institutions that use the Oddy test in their research are mainly art museums such as The J. Paul Getty Museum, The Nelson-Atkins Museum of Art, and the Metropolitan Museum of Art.
