= Conservation and restoration of copper-based objects =

The conservation and restoration of copper-based objects involves processes of characterization, preservation, protection, and further treatment aimed at stabilizing and maintaining items made from copper and copper alloys, particularly those with historical, archaeological, or cultural significance. These activities are typically carried out by professional conservator-restorers.

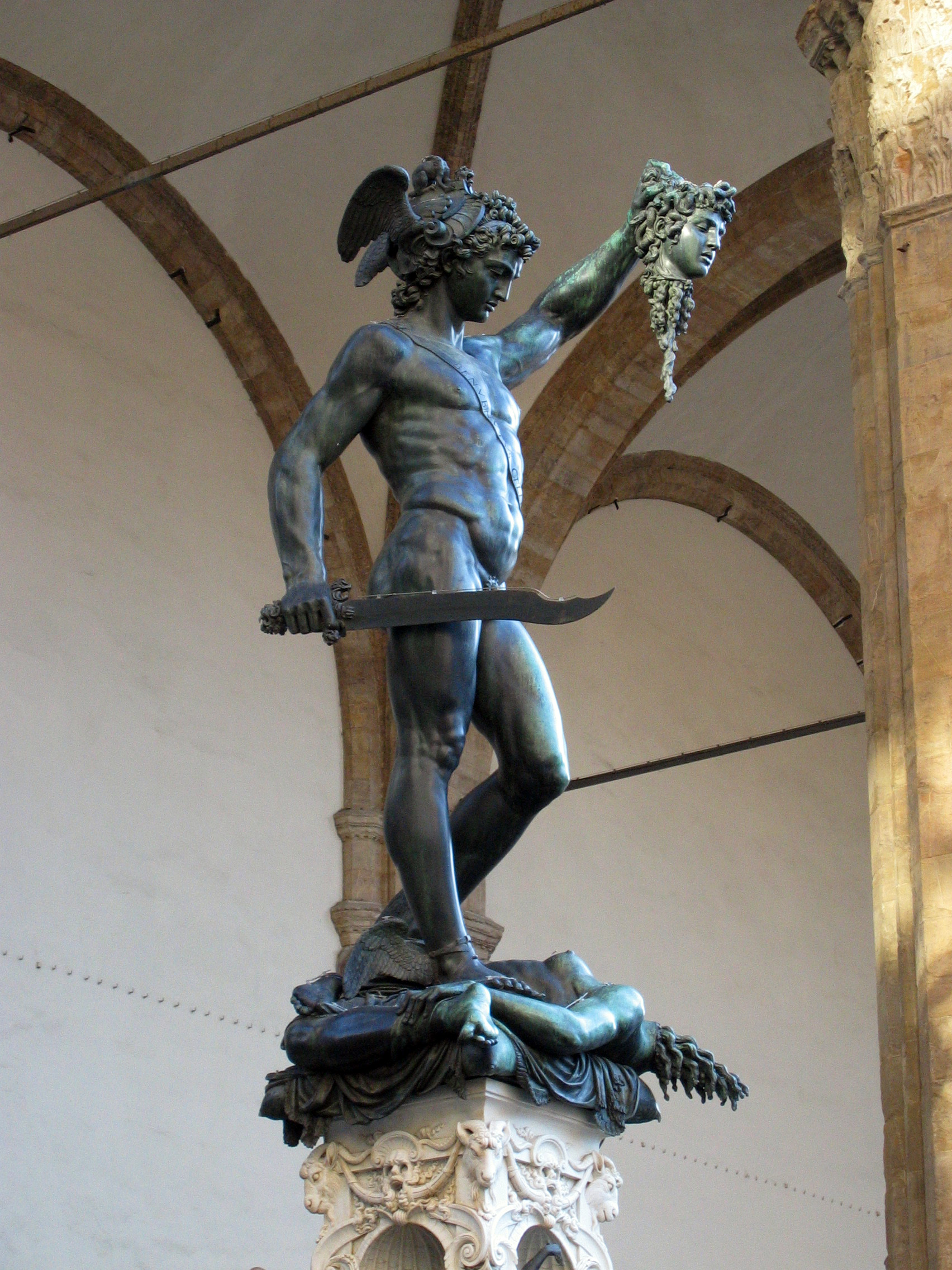
Perseus with the Head of Medusa, bronze, by Benvenuto Cellini, in the Loggia dei Lanzi gallery on the edge of the Piazza della Signoria in Florence; picture taken after the statue's cleaning and restoration

Copper is one of the most widely used metals in the field of cultural heritage. Copper and its alloys, such as bronze and brass, historically have been widely used not only in the artistic field but also in architecture to create elements for outdoor exposure. Sometimes, ancient copper artefacts (coins, jewellery, weapons, and ritual items) can be found preserved in soil. Copper is known for developing a distinctive patina over time, which is often valued not only for its notable corrosion resistance but also for its aesthetic and historical value. Particularly in the case of copper and bronze, the term Noble Patina is commonly used to describe patinas that enhance corrosion resistance. The surface of the monuments is often very complex, not only due to the heterogeneous aspect of patina formation, but also due to the possible previous conservation works performed on the works of art. Additionally, the intricate form and shape of the object's geometry have a great influence on the homogeneity of the formation of various corrosion products: areas more exposed to rain act differently in comparison to the areas that are sheltered. This makes the restoration and conservation process highly complex, requiring specialized knowledge, technical skill, and professional expertise on the part of the conservator-restorer.

== History ==
=== Copper Age ===
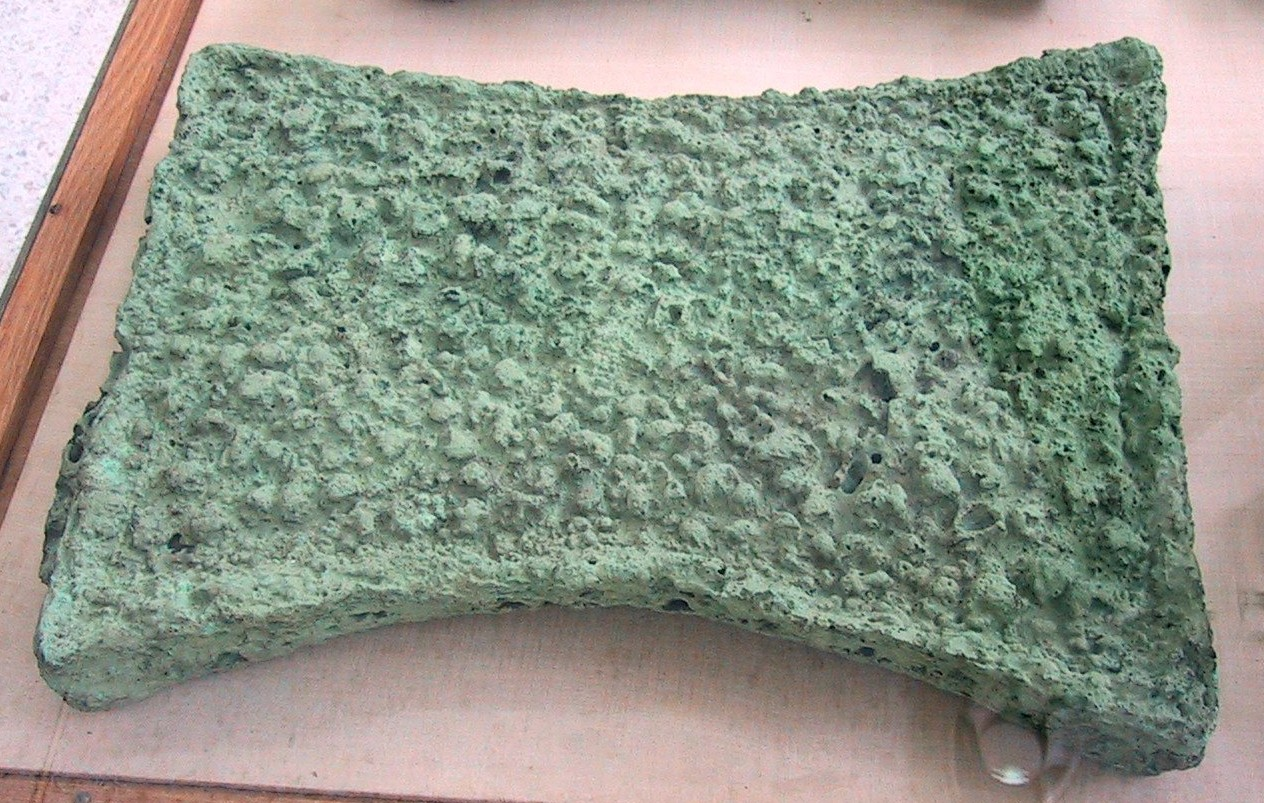
A corroded copper ingot from Zakros, Crete, shaped in the form of an animal skin typical in that era

Copper occurs naturally as native copper and was known to some of the oldest civilizations on record. It has a history of use that is at least 10,000 years old, and estimates of its discovery place it at 9000 BC in the Middle East; a copper pendant was found in northern Iraq that dates to 8700 BC. There is evidence that gold and meteoric iron (but not iron smelting) were the only metals used by humans before copper. The history of copper metallurgy is thought to have followed the following sequence: 1) cold working of native copper, 2) annealing, 3) smelting, and 4) the lost wax method. In southeastern Anatolia, all four of these metallurgical techniques appear more or less simultaneously at the beginning of the Neolithic c. 7500 BC. However, just as agriculture was independently invented in several parts of the world (including Pakistan, China, and the Americas), copper smelting was invented locally in several different places. It was probably discovered independently in China before 2800 BC, in Central America perhaps around 600 AD, and in West Africa about the 9th or 10th century AD. Investment casting was invented in 4500–4000 BC in Southeast Asia and carbon dating has established mining at Alderley Edge in Cheshire, UK, at 2280 to 1890 BC. Ötzi the Iceman, a male dated from 3300 to 3200 BC, was found with an axe with a copper head 99.7% pure; high levels of arsenic in his hair suggest his involvement in copper smelting. Experience with copper has assisted the development of other metals; in particular, copper smelting led to the discovery of iron smelting. Production in the Old Copper Complex in Michigan and Wisconsin is dated between 6000 and 3000 BC. Natural bronze, a type of copper made from ores rich in silicon, arsenic, and (rarely) tin, came into general use in the Balkans around 5500 BC. Previously the only tool made of copper had been the awl, used for punching holes in leather and gouging out peg-holes for wood joining. However, the introduction of a more robust form of copper led to the widespread use, and large-scale production of heavy metal tools, including axes, adzes, and axe-adzes.

=== Bronze Age ===
Alloying copper with tin to make bronze was first practiced about 4000 years after the discovery of copper smelting, and about 2000 years after "natural bronze" had come into general use. Bronze artifacts from Sumerian cities and Egyptian artifacts of copper and bronze alloys date to 3000 BC. The Bronze Age began in Southeastern Europe around 3700–3300 BC, in Northwestern Europe about 2500 BC. It ended with the beginning of the Iron Age, 2000–1000 BC in the Near East, 600 BC in Northern Europe. The transition between the Neolithic period and the Bronze Age was formerly termed the Chalcolithic period (copper-stone), with copper tools being used with stone tools. This term has gradually fallen out of favor because in some parts of the world the Calcholithic and Neolithic are coterminous at both ends. Brass, an alloy of copper and zinc, is of much more recent origin. It was known to the Greeks, but became a significant supplement to bronze during the Roman Empire.

=== Antiquity and Middle Ages ===
In alchemy the symbol for copper was also the symbol for the goddess and planet Venus.

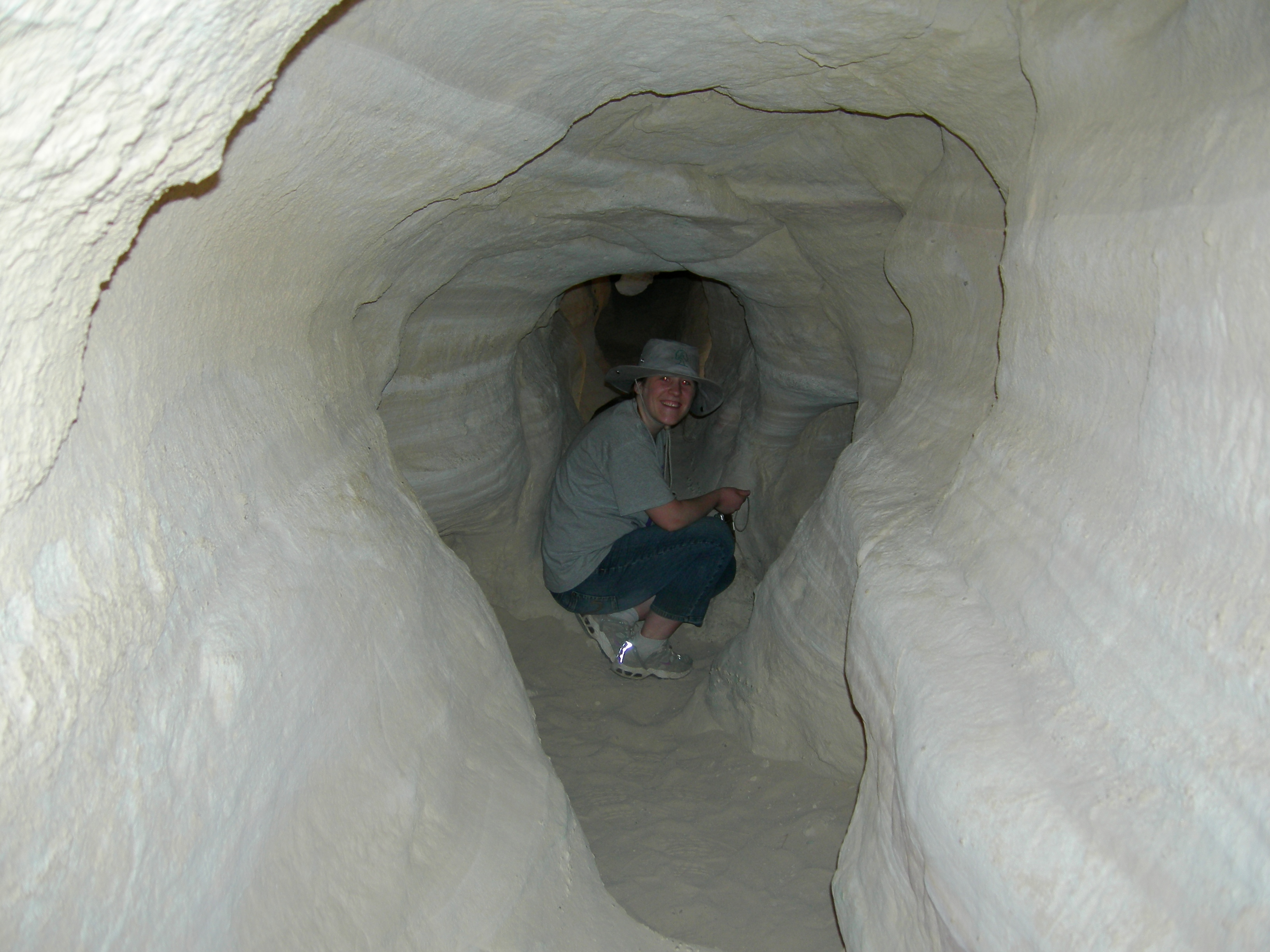
Chalcolithic copper mine in Timna Valley, Negev Desert, Israel

In Greece, copper was known by the name chalkos (χαλκός). It was an important resource for the Romans, Greeks and other ancient peoples. In Roman times, it was known as aes Cyprium, aes being the generic Latin term for copper alloys and Cyprium from Cyprus, where much copper was mined. The phrase was simplified to cuprum, hence the English copper. Aphrodite and Venus represented copper in mythology and alchemy, because of its lustrous beauty, its ancient use in producing mirrors, and its association with Cyprus, which was sacred to the goddess. The seven heavenly bodies known to the ancients were associated with the seven metals known in antiquity, and Venus was assigned to copper.

Britain's first use of brass occurred around the 3rd–2nd century BC. In North America, copper mining began with marginal workings by Native Americans. Native copper is known to have been extracted from sites on Isle Royale with primitive stone tools between 800 and 1600.

=== Modern period ===
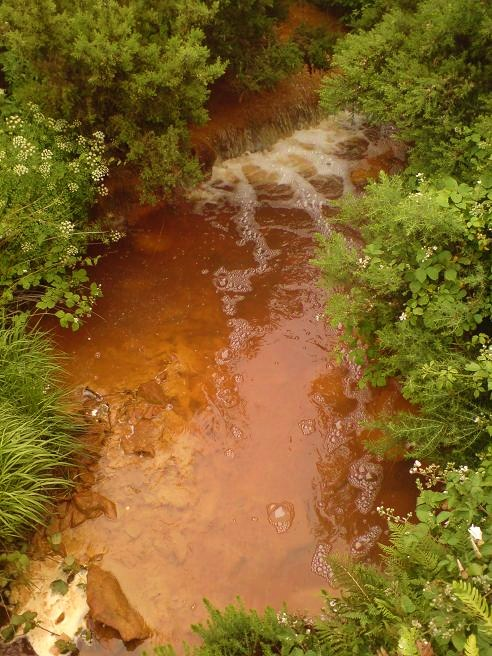
Acid mine drainage affecting the stream running from the disused Parys Mountain copper mines

The Great Copper Mountain was a mine in Falun, Sweden, that operated from the 10th century to 1992. It produced two-thirds of Europe's copper demand in the 17th century and helped fund many of Sweden's wars during that time. It was referred to as the nation's treasury; Sweden had a copper backed currency.

The uses of copper in art were not limited to currency: it was used by Renaissance sculptors, in photographic technology known as the daguerreotype, and in the Statue of Liberty. Copper electroplating and copper sheathing for ships' hulls was widespread; the ships of Christopher Columbus were among the earliest to have this feature. The Norddeutsche Affinerie in Hamburg was the first modern electroplating plant starting its production in 1876. The German scientist Gottfried Osann invented powder metallurgy in 1830 while determining the metal's atomic mass; around then it was discovered that the amount and type of alloying element (e.g., tin) to copper would affect bell tones. Flash smelting was developed by Outokumpu in Finland and first applied at Harjavalta in 1949; the energy-efficient process accounts for 50% of the world's primary copper production.

The Intergovernmental Council of Copper Exporting Countries, formed in 1967 with Chile, Peru, Zaire and Zambia, played a similar role for copper as OPEC does for oil. It never achieved the same influence, particularly because the second-largest producer, the United States, was never a member; it was dissolved in 1988.

== Pure and alloyed copper in sculptures ==
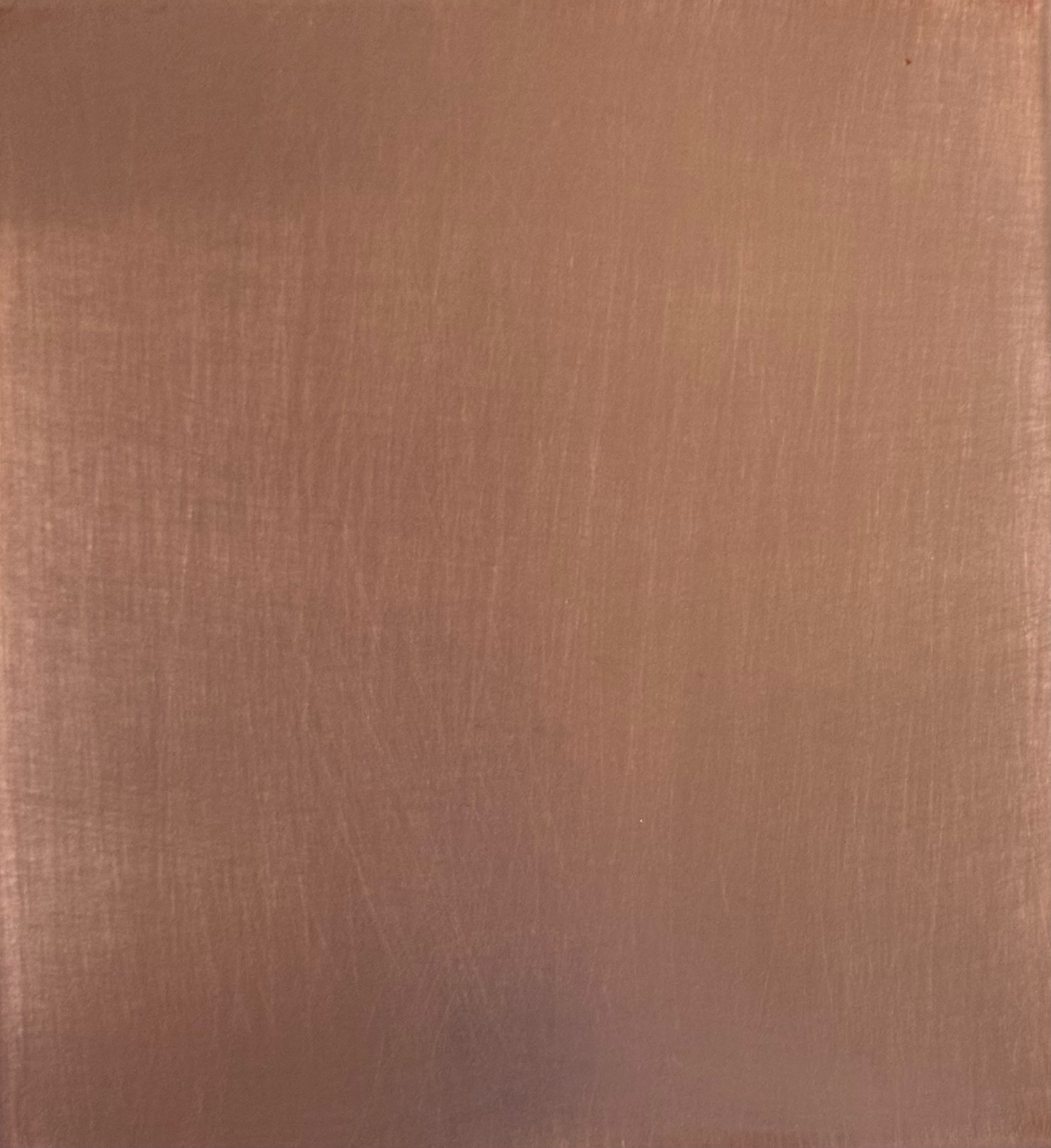
Photo of a pure, polished copper

One of the most important properties of copper from a sculptural point of view is its high degree of malleability. The metal possesses great tenacity or physical strength and is highly resistant to corrosion in dry air. In the presence of humidity and/or moisture, there is a superficial formation of a darker patina layer. Copper is sometimes used in a relatively pure form in place of bronze as a casting material. It is a foundation of all bronzes, brasses, and nickel-silver alloys. The cost of copper as a sculptural material is fairly moderate.

=== Brass ===
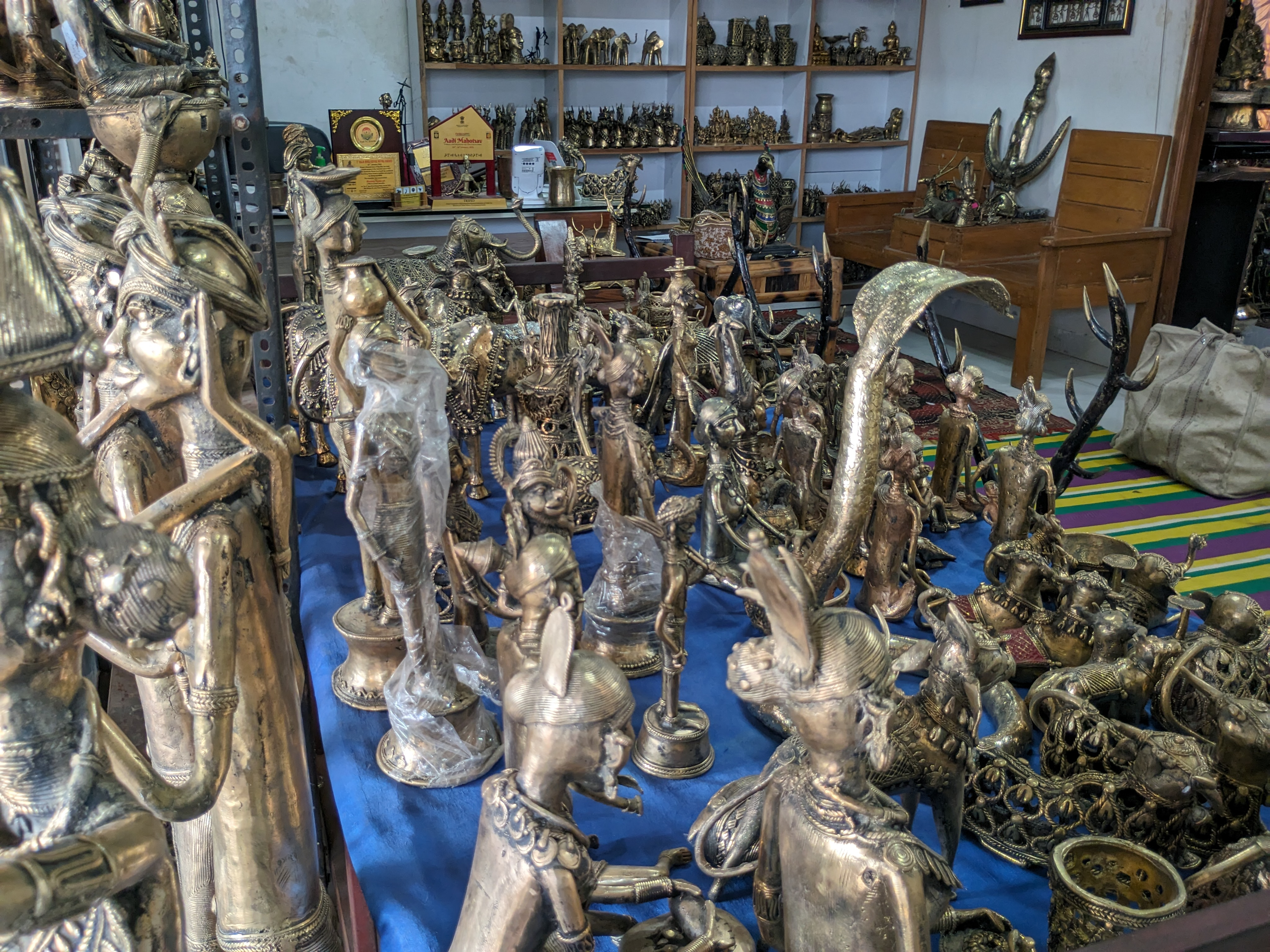
Brass structures created using the Bharai Kaam lost-wax casting technique in Craft Village, Tigariya, Betul, Madhya Pradesh.

The discovery and early application of brass are not accurately known, but it appears that ancient people already used it. Brass is an important alloy in sculpture and is composed fundamentally of copper and zinc. The colour of the alloy is golden yellow. As the copper content increases, the colour of the alloy becomes darker and richer. Alloys containing from 15 to 25% of zinc will resemble gold in colour and be somewhat malleable. An alloy composed of 10 parts copper to each part zinc will have a reddish-yellow colour. As the zinc content of a brass alloy is increased, the metal formed becomes increasingly hard and brittle, and the colour changes to a silvery white, finally turning grey. The type of brass called "fine casting brass" is composed of approximately 90 parts of copper, 7 parts of zinc, 2 parts of tin and 1 part of lead. Today, brass is almost exclusively used as a casting medium. The alloy is substantially harder than copper and wears better. It takes a fine polish and is more resistant than pure copper to atmospheric corrosion. Although the surface must be protected with wax or other treatment almost immediately to avoid tarnishing. Brass is almost invariably kept brightly polished and free from artificial patination.

=== Bronze ===
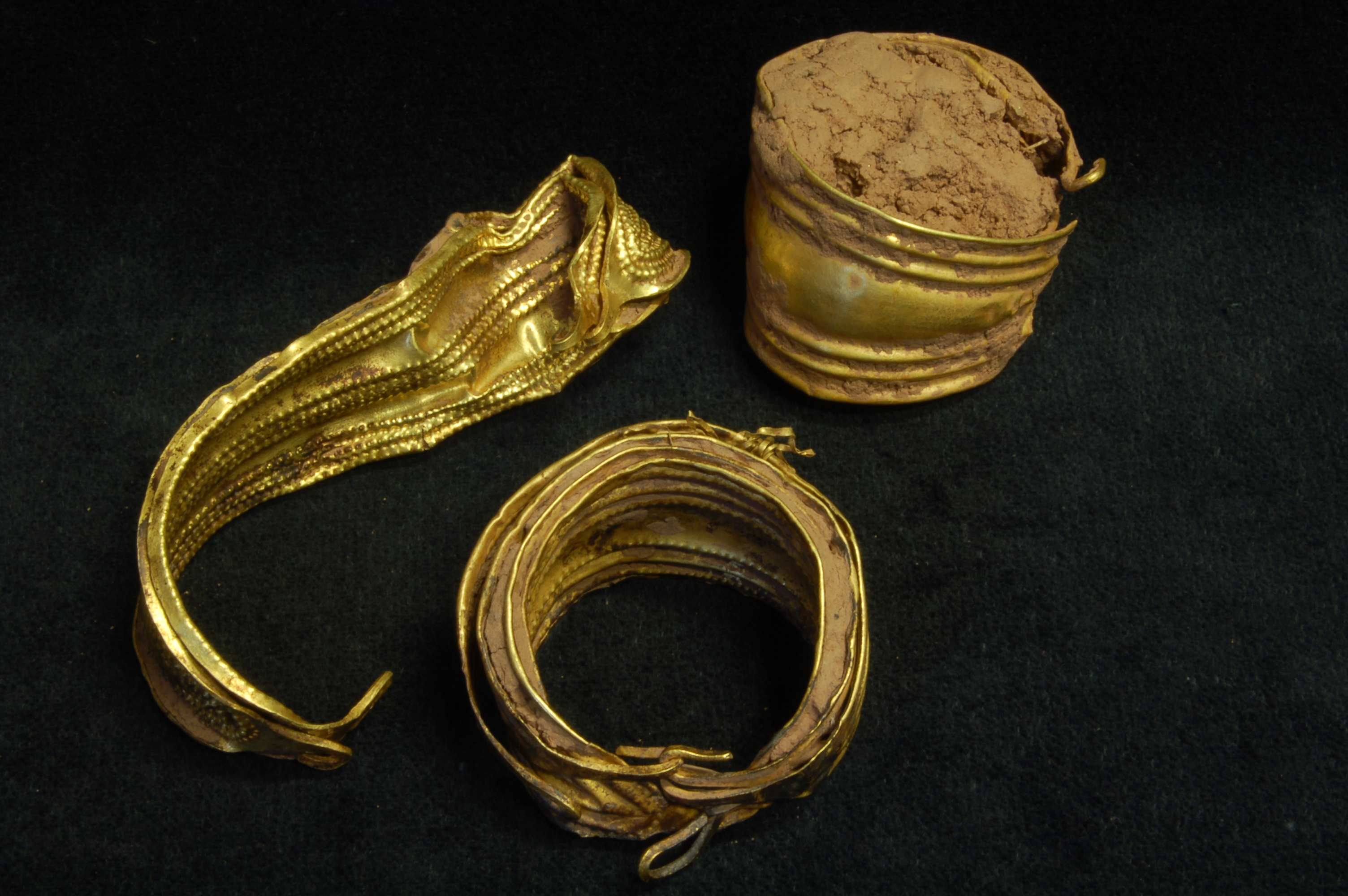
Bronze Age gold bracelet hoard (FindID 627280)

Bronze appears to be the most extensively used material of all the sculptural media. Its great popularity is deserved due to the excellent structural strength, physical permanence and resistance to atmospheric corrosion. Among other qualities of bronze is its relatively easy casting process and a fine, compact surface that takes a great finish or patina. Bronze is an alloy composed of copper and tin, although other metals in small quantities are occasionally added for reasons of appearance, physical strength, or increased resistance to corrosion. The major ingredient of bronze is always copper, with the next metal in proportion being tin. The addition of tin to copper results in an alloy with greater strength, hardness, and durability than an alloy with zinc additions (brass). Bronze alloys range in colour from a pure silvery appearance, resulting from a larger proportion of tin in the alloy, through golden-yellow colour to a rich coppery red. One of the most popular ancient recipes for a warm-coloured bronze consists of 88 parts of copper, 10 parts of tin, and 2 parts of zinc. It has a fine grain, a high resistance to corrosion, and takes an excellent finish. Giorgio Vasari describes more popular recipes, such as an Italian rule (two-thirds copper and one-third brass) and an Egyptian formula (one-third copper and two-thirds brass). The finest of all was considered an "electron metal", made of two parts copper and one part silver. Standard alloy commercially known as United States Standard Bronze consists of 90% copper, 7% tin, and 3% zinc. Some sculptors occasionally add a small quantity of lead to a molten bronze mass to lower the melting point of the resulting bronze and also to soften it physically.

=== Aluminium bronze ===
Aluminium bronze is produced by alloying copper with aluminium instead of tin. The substance is used as a positive casting material. Aluminium bronzes contain aluminium in a proportion rarely exceeding 10% of the total alloy. The alloy is superior physically to ordinary tin-copper bronze, but it is substantially harder to work and finish.

=== Copper-nickel alloys ===
Copper-nickel alloys have great physical strength and are highly resistant to corrosion. When nickel is added to brass or bronze, there is a marked increase in the toughness of the resulting alloy. When nickel is present in a copper-nickel alloy in excess of 20%, the resulting alloy is while or silvery in colour. The use of this alloy is restricted to the casting of positives.

=== Monel metal ===
Monel metal is an alloy of copper and nickel containing around 65% nickel, 28% copper and about 7% of impurities of iron, manganese, and cobalt. It is much harder than either pure copper or pure nickel and is stronger structurally. The alloy is highly resistant to corrosion, possesses a pleasant silvery appearance, and can be used as a casting medium.

=== German silver ===
German silver is also referred to as nickel-silver. It is a brass alloy composed of 10 to 30% nickel and 5 to 50% zinc, the balance consisting of copper. The name is derived from the silvery appearance of the alloys. They possess a high resistance to atmospheric corrosion and are used as positive casting materials.

== Patina classification ==
=== Natural patina ===
Most of the general types of natural corrosion occur in the atmosphere. Atmospheres can be classified into four types, but in reality, they could be mixed and present together with no clear separation:

- Industrial (Urban) environment
- Marine environment
- Rural environment
- Indoor environment

Special case: Corrosion in soils

Additionally, the type of atmosphere varies with the wind patterns, especially where corrosive pollutants are concerned. Major components of copper patinas are well-known and are related to the trace species found in the atmosphere (oxygen, pollutants such as NOx, SO2, sea salt, etc.). Patina components usually do not reflect the atmospheric composition directly but favour some with certain crystal structures, solubility, and chemical reactivity. Below is a table of a general summary of all minerals and other crystalline substances found on corroded copper.

Substances found on corroded copper
Substance	Formula	Colour
Copper	Cu	Salmon-pink
Cuprite	Cu_{2}O	Red/brown
Tenorite	CuO	Gray-black
Spertiniite	Cu(OH)_{2}	Blue-green
Chalcocite	Cu_{2}S	Dark grey
Covellite	CuS	Dark blue/black
Inorganic copper salts
Brochantite	Cu_{4}SO_{4}(OH)_{6}	Black-grey
Antlerite	Cu_{3}SO_{4}(OH)_{4}	Dark green/black
Atacamite	Cu_{2}Cl(OH)_{3}	Bright green
Paratacamite	Cu_{2}Cl(OH)_{3}	Green
Gerhardtite	Cu_{2}NO_{3}(OH)_{3}	Emerald green
Malachite	Cu_{2}CO_{3}(OH)_{2}	Bright, pale green
Azurite	Cu_{3}(CO_{3})_{2}(OH)_{2}	Greenish blue
Organic copper salts
Formate	Cu(HCO_{2})_{2}	Royal blue
Acetate	Cu(CH_{3}CO_{2})_{2}	Blue-green
Oxalate	Cu(C_{2}O_{4})×xH_{2}O	Bluish-white
Other components: Atmospheric particles

==== Cuprite and tenorite ====
Copper(I) oxide, or cuprite, is the initial corrosion product that forms on copper under atmospheric conditions; particularly for exposure no more than a few months, it is already easily detected by X-ray diffraction. Some studies report on the rapid formation of copper (II) oxide – tenorite. This compound is known to react with gaseous constituents at ambient conditions, specifically with SO_{2}, to transform into more stable compounds. Since several of the crystalline structures in copper patinas contain the –OH group, the presence of hydroxides or hydrated oxides on the copper surface during initial exposure serves as a "building block" for various patina constituents. Cuprite growth rate, thickness and physical barrier properties depend mainly on environmental conditions and are responsible for the initial surface colour change into darker shades of brown.

==== Chalcocite and covellite ====
In urban areas, when copper is exposed to sulfur gases in humid air, copper(I) and (II) sulphides are occasionally found. The formation of chalcocite is unlikely, except under unusual conditions. But, in each case, the exact composition and form of the mineral have not been identified. It was suggested that chalcocite was the initial form, and later, it was oxidized to covellite and co-existed with brochantite since Cu^{+} is rapidly oxidised to Cu^{2+} in open environments.

==== Brochantite ====
Basic copper sulfate is nearly always the most common component of the patina formed in an urban environment. Posnjakite works as a precursor for the formation of brochantite. This process is characteristic of urban and rural environments where sulfate deposition predominates, with minimal chloride influence. Sometimes, another precursor, langite, is observed together with posnjakite, especially in less polluted and more humid conditions. In rare cases, strandbergite also acts as a precursor.

==== Antlerite ====
Antlerite may occur in earlier stages of the patination process than brochantite. In more acidic environments, strandbergite and, less commonly, posnjakite form as precursors. Brochantite and antlerite are probably forming independently because of localised corrosion differences.

==== Atacamite and paratacamite ====
In chloride-rich environments, such as near the seaside, via dissolution of Cu_{2}O and reaction of newly formed cuprous ions with chloride ions, a precursor called nantokite (CuCl) is formed. Through many dissolution – ion pairing – precipitation steps, two isomorphic compounds are produced: atacamite and/or paratacamite. CuCl was locally observed and identified within the patina in between the inner layer of cuprite and the outer layer of atacamite/paratacamite. Atacamite is stable only at chloride concentrations near the top of the range of concentrations found in rain, so in both rain and fog, it is only marginally stable.

==== Gerhardtite ====
A crystalline form of basic copper (II) nitrate is occasionally seen on copper surfaces near electrical discharges. It is stable only at high nitrogen concentrations and, therefore, is not expected to be a common patina component.

==== Malachite and azurite ====
Nowadays, malachite is recognised to be a minor trace rather than the principal component. Azurite is a less stable phase, and in the presence of moisture, it tends to transform into malachite.

=== Artistic patina ===
The practice of creating artistic patinas originated during the Renaissance period. Giorgio Vasari in his book "Lives of the Most Excellent Painters, Sculptors and Architects" in Chapter IV (IX) discusses the following methods of artificial patination of bronze: surface can be turned black with oil or varnish, and green with vinegar. Generalised use of artificial patina as a common practice began in the early 20th century: some of the most popular methods of artistic patination are described by Richard Hughes and include methods described below.

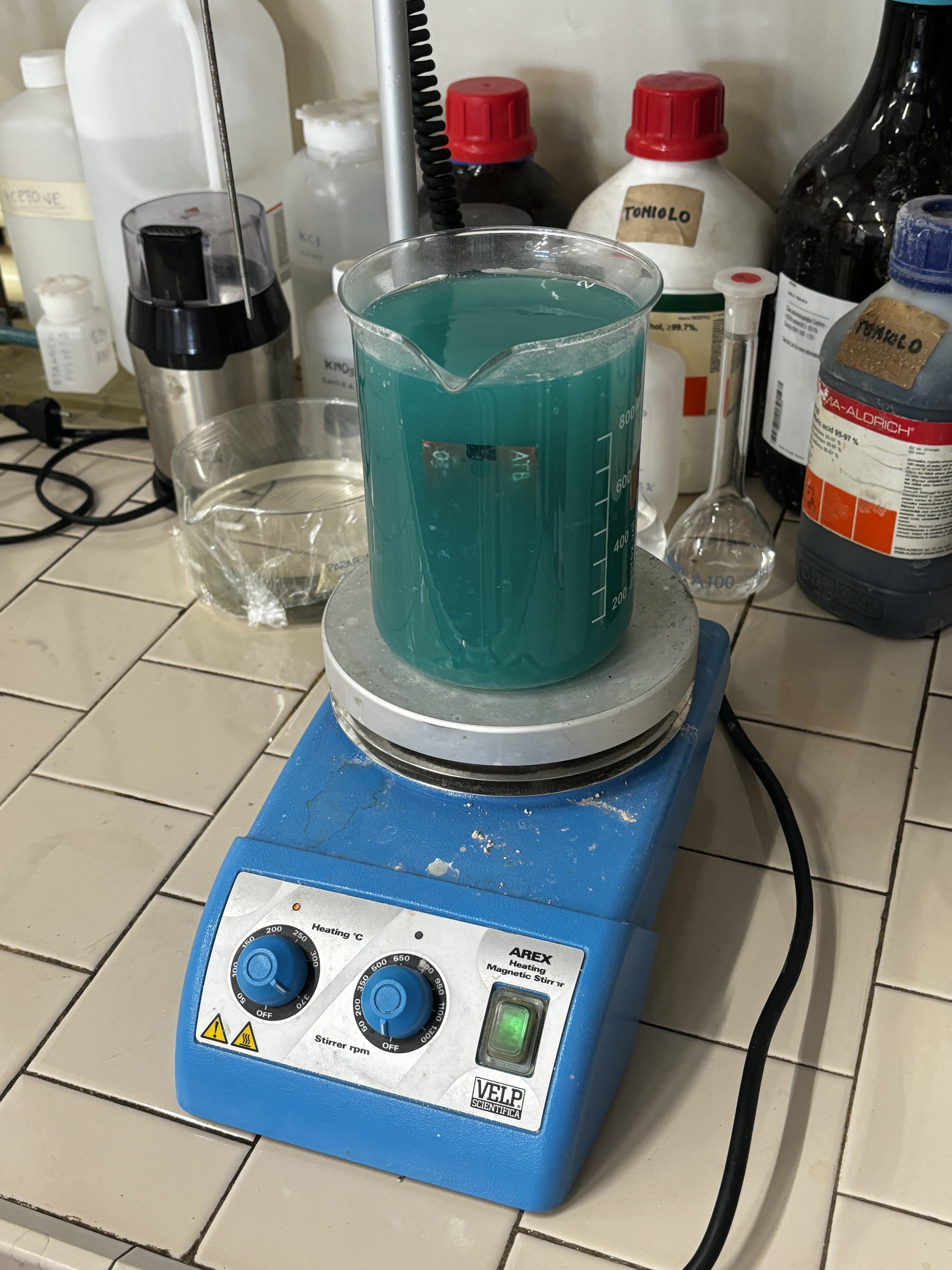
A photo of a beaker with a chemical solution on a heater with a copper sample inside

Immersion

For small objects, such as, for example, jewellery, total immersion in a solution of chemicals at various temperatures can be used as a way to achieve a quick layer of patina on the surface.

Applied pastes

A certain range of chemicals is traditionally used in the form of pastes to colour objects of various sizes. Two main approaches are usually implemented. The first one is when the patinating solutions are thickened into pastes using inert materials (clay, gelatin, flour). Generally, this approach tends to fail because it excludes air from reacting with the surface directly. The second approach is when, to the solid ingredients of the patinating solution, only a small quantity of water is added. This approach, with a thick creamy consistency, is the most suitable for patination, especially on vertical surfaces.

Torch technique

This method involves stippling the solution onto a metal surface that is pre-heated with the blowtorch. A wide range of colours, from green to brown, can be produced, but the quality of the patina largely depends on the skill of the artist.

Heat colouring

Using heat is a good way to colour the metal surface without any additional chemicals. Application of heat induces the formation of natural oxides in metal, making the colour of the surface vary from red to brown-black, depending on the temperature used.

Other application techniques

Many traditional patination procedures are direct applications of the solutions to the surface of an object. Basic colouring is achieved even after one application, but the usual process involves a cycle of applications and periods of drying until the desired colour is developed. There are four main ways of the solution application variants: dabbing/wiping, dipping, brushing, and spraying. Each variant has its advantages and disadvantages, but the main problem is the failure to wet the surface of the metal (especially finely polished) evenly due to the retraction of the solution into small pools.

=== Laboratory patina ===
Laboratory patination aims to replicate an accurate representation of the naturally formed patina in the shortest time possible. Since natural ageing procedures are quite time-consuming, some specific artistic techniques can be commonly adapted to particular scientific needs. Generally, there are three main categories of laboratory patination procedures, which include artificial ageing of the specimens, chemical and electrochemical procedures.

Artificial ageing

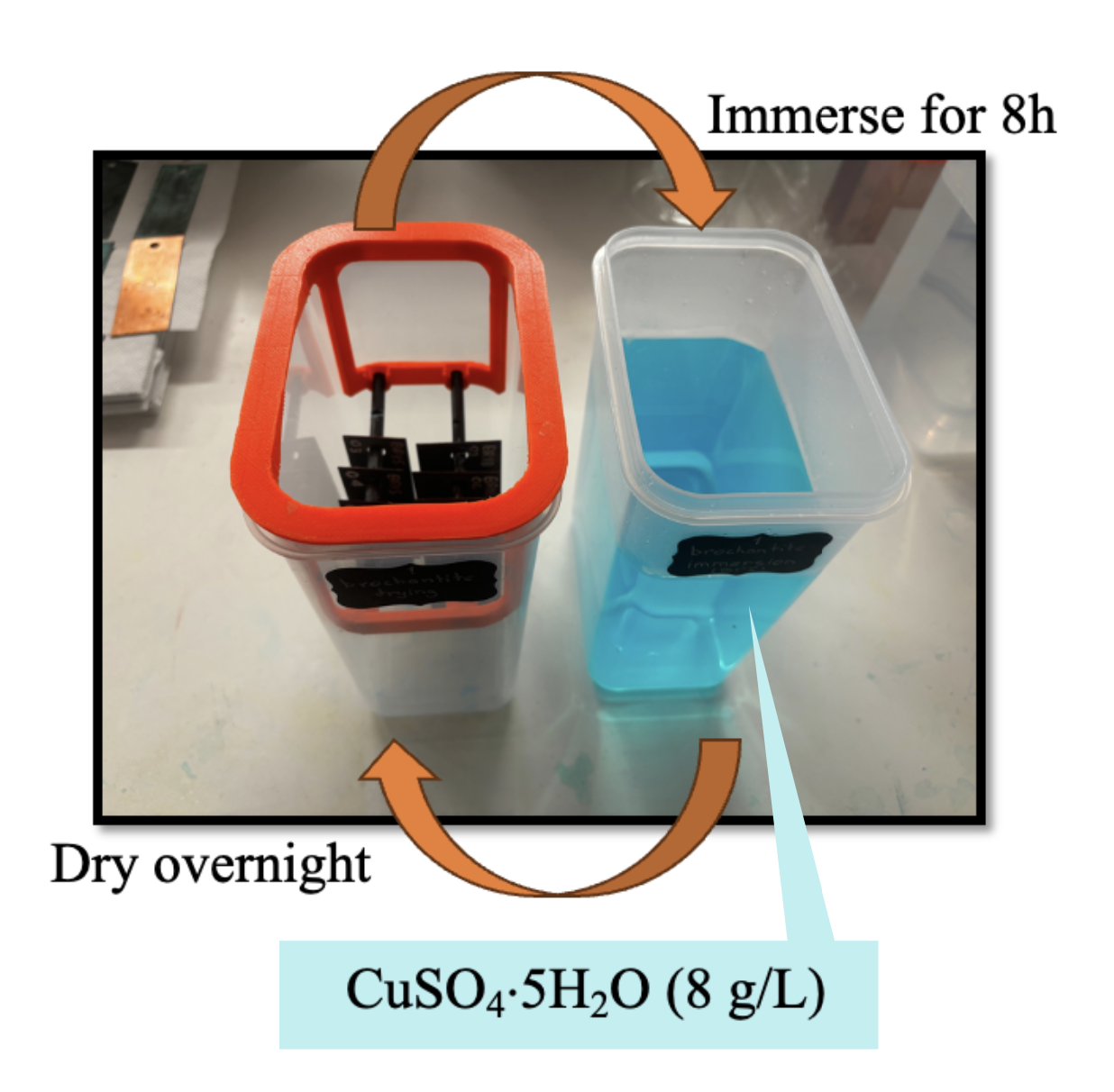
A scheme of a "wet&dry" patination method to obtain brochantite patina

Artificial ageing is based on the exposition of the sample to specific environmental conditions, imitating the natural environment. Rainwater stagnation, also known as wet&dry cycles, is typically simulated through alternating immersion, where specimens are periodically submerged in a synthetic rain solution and then allowed to dry naturally.

Chemical patination

Chemical patination involves the application of specific chemicals and corrosive agents on the metal surface. This fast and straightforward technique often draws from artistic patination methods.

Electrochemical patination

When performing electrochemical patination, the sample is immersed in a saline solution with a specific composition, and the corrosion process is enhanced by imposing currents or potentials.

== Conservation ==
Bronze disease

=== Cleaning ===
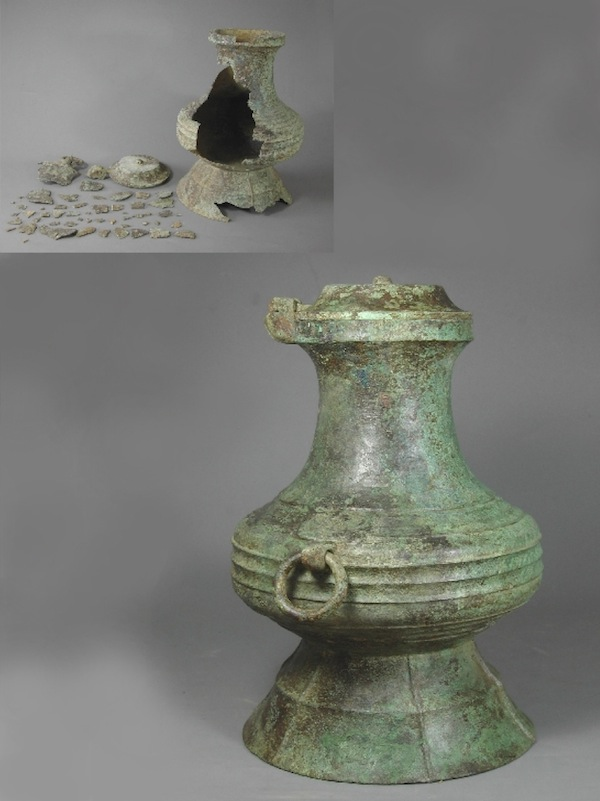
Bronze Hui before and after conservation

Cleaning the metallic work of art is a fundamental yet challenging step. Not only is it necessary in cases when the sculpted details of the metallic surfaces are no longer recognisable, but also for the selective removal of all of the corrosion/deposit layers that are unstable and can be harmful to the metallic surfaces and can cause further degradation. During this procedure, also remains of the previous conservation interventions are normally removed. This process is irreversible, so it is crucial to keep it at a minimum invasiveness. Therefore, the importance of natural and artistic patinas has to be considered: they contribute to the historic and aesthetic value of the work of art, and should be properly preserved. Complete removal of artistic and natural patinas should also be avoided from the corrosion point of view, as some of these patinas enhance corrosion resistance of the metal surface. Cleaning should be aimed selectively only to remove the layers of atmospheric particulate deposits, surface layers that have lost cohesion and adherence and aged/degraded protective coatings from past restoration interventions. The experience and perception of the conservators are often leading factors in the definition of the cleaning procedures to be adopted, since there is no general protocol to perform cleaning procedures. Each case is unique and different, and the procedure should be modified accordingly to the specific conservation state of the artefact.

Traditional cleaning procedures for copper alloys include a variety of methodologies based mainly on mechanical or chemical removal. To remove dust and thin atmospheric deposits, soft cleaning procedures can be used, such as cyclic deionised water rinses, low-pressure water blasting, and mechanical removal by nylon brushes. With thicker surfaces to be removed, stronger abrasive or vibrating tools can be used. Chemical methods include the use of aqueous neutral solutions of salts, like sodium bicarbonate. Organic solvents are also often used to dissolve and remove residual aged organic coatings. After rinsing surfaces with water, ethanol or acetone is used to facilitate the rapid and complete drying of the surface.

It is quite rare for a cleaning intervention to be carried out using only one methodology, and they are usually used in combination to achieve optimal results. For example, it is common to clean the surface first mechanically, with a brush or scalpel, and then perform more precise cleaning in localized areas using more critical techniques.

As an alternative, a laser cleaning technique induced by a pulsed laser is sometimes used by restorers.

Chemical
Ammonium citrate 5% / pH 9

Citric acid 20% + 4% thiourea

Phosphoric acid 10–20% + 1% thiourea

EDTA 4% pH 10

Potassium sodium tartarate 25%

NaOH 120 g/40 g glycerol/1 L water

Polymethacrylic acid 10–15% pH 4.5–5.5

Electrochemical
NaOH 2–5%, stainless steel anodes + Ecorr measurement!
Mechanical
Precipitated chalk/water mixture

scalpel

micromotor and steel/or bristle brushes

microsanblasting unit

dry ice blasting

Ultrasonic
4–6 g sodium carbonate /6–8 g sodium phosphate

10–12 g sodium metasilicate 1 L distilled water 2–5 minutes, then rinse well and repeat if needs

Laser
Can be used

Plasma
Can be used

=== Protective coatings ===
Employment of protective systems constituted by protective coatings (often in combinations with corrosion inhibitors or with each other) is one of the most commonly adopted solutions to prevent or at least mitigate corrosion of the cultural heritage artefacts. The application of protective coatings is aimed at avoiding the contact of the electrolyte (usually rainwater for objects exposed outdoors) with the surface by creating a hydrophobic physical barrier.

==== Traditional methods ====
===== Waxes =====
Waxes have been used since historical times to protect and give luster to the metallic surfaces, and are still commonly used nowadays. They are normally applied to create a barrier between the metal and moisture and oxygen from the atmosphere. Waxes are widely appreciated in the conservation field due to their naturally looking finish. Due to its low durability, waxes are usually used in combination with other types of coatings as a final topcoat layer to prolong the lifespan of the other coatings. In addition, when applied to porous patinas, they can produce the darkening of the surface and accumulations of dust, which is considered a disadvantage in the cultural heritage field, as it alters the visual appearance of an artefact. In general, when compared to varnishes, waxes offer poor corrosion protection in the long term, as their resistance to weathering is very limited.

Natural wax

Natural waxes, which were used in the past, are now being avoided because when in contact with metal, they can produce damaging organic acids. Furthermore, wax can even accelerate the speed of corrosion due to its porosity by retaining the water solution in contact with the metal surface. Carnauba and paraffin waxes are also sometimes used in the conservation of metallic cultural heritage, but are not highly recommended.

Microcrystalline wax

Microcrystalline wax is a mix of paraffinic, isoparaffinic and naphthenic hydrocarbons. They have an improved elasticity that prevents cracking, due to fine crystals in their composition. Some of the widely used commercial products of microcrystalline wax are Renaissance, Cosmolloid H80, TeCe (by Tromm GmbH), Butchers (or Bowling Alley Wax), and Scoter waxes. Microcrystalline waxes offer poor protection for outdoor use, and are preferred for use on the artefacts kept indoors.

Polyethylene wax

Polyethylene (PE) waxes are polymers with a high degree of crystallinity and linearity. They have a higher melting point in comparison with microcrystalline waxes. Mainly, this type of wax has been used in mixed formulations with microcrystalline waxes. Commercially produced PE wax emulsions, such as Poligen ES, showed better results than commonly used acrylic resins Paraloid B-72 and B-44, with a better visual appearance, close to the natural aspect of waxes. Unfortunately, the alkaline content in some of the Poligen formulations makes it unsuitable for use on copper and brass.

===== Acrylic resins =====
Acrylic resins are the most commonly used group of coatings for the protection of copper-based cultural heritage objects. Generally, this is a group of transparent thermoplastic resins that are based on acrylic and/or methacrylic polymers or copolymers. Most of the acrylics show great chemical stability and adhesion properties, especially when exposed indoors. On the contrary, when the artefact is exposed outdoors, a slight yellowing and loss of some mechanical properties are unavoidable. The most common commercial group of acrylic resins for cultural heritage use is the Paraloid family by Rohm & Haas. The most common products for the conservation of copper-based artefacts are Paraloid B-72, Paraloid B-44 and Incralac. Other possible acrylics that are sometimes used are Paraloid B48-N, Paraloid B-67 and Paraloid B-82. Paraloid formulations are mainly used for the indoor-kept metallic artefacts. Incralac, on the other hand, showed the best performance for outdoor use. It is a mix of Paraloid B-44, benzotriazole (BTA) and some other additives. A big disadvantage of these acrylic resins is their very limited reversibility, which makes it difficult to remove the leftover coating during restoration procedures.

===== Nitrocellulose lacquers =====
Nitrocellulose lacquers are polynitrate esters of the natural polysaccharide cellulose, first marketed as Agateen (Agate Lacquer LLC.) and Ercolene/Frigilene (W. Canning & Co.). Even though it could be used for all metals, its main application is on silver to be kept indoors. This type of coating showed yellowing and damage in the same way acrylic resins act over time, as well as becoming insoluble in the same organic solvents used to prepare them, making the cleaning procedures during restoration processes highly complicated.

==== Ongoing research ====
===== Fluoropolymers =====
Fluorinated coatings are composed of organic polymers in which some or all of the hydrogen atoms that are bonded to carbon are replaced by fluorine. Depending on the fluorine content and its distribution, the final polymer results in different properties. The most common fluoropolymers are polytetrafluoroethylene (PTFE), polyvinyl fluoride (PVF) and polyvinylidene (PVDF). PVDF is found to be the biggest use of them all in the field of metallic heritage due to its great resistance to UV radiation and chemical inertness. On the other hand, this chemical inertness makes it difficult for PVDF to adhere to the surface, so usually it is blended with acrylic resins, such as Paraloid B-44 and Paraloid A-21. More recent mixtures of fluorinated acrylic (FA) copolymers have started to be commercialised (Funcosil AG). To further increase adherence to bronze, some studies on adhesion promoters such as poly-methylmethacrylate (MS) are in progress.

===== Organosilanes =====
Silane-based coatings have become a more environmentally friendly alternative to traditional treatments. Silane sol-gel coatings offer possibilities of different application techniques and good adhesion and penetration both in metal surfaces and in patinas, which is extremely important when working with metallic heritage objects that are often very corroded.

The first studies of organosilanes on bronze were performed on ORMOCERs developed by the Fraunhofer Institute. In general, good adhesion is achieved, and there is no loss of performance after ageing; however, limited reversibility, together with colour changes, are great disadvantages of this type of coating.

Among silicon alkoxides, the most popular is tetraethoxysilane (TEOS). TEOS was used as a precursor to prepare nanosilica (SiO_{2}) coatings on the surface of copper, bronze and brass (not patinated). The coatings were obtained using modifying agents trimethylchlorosilane (TMCS) and hexamethyldisilozane (HMDS). When SiO_{2} is modified with HMDS under alkaline conditions, coatings with good hydrophobic properties are obtained. However, its protective ability is limited since parameters such as polarisation resistance are higher for bare bronze than for the coated one. The protective HMDS modified alkaline silica coatings could be successfully used for the protection and conservation of copper, bronze and brass in ambient conditions.

Among the most commonly used alkoxysilanes, research on 3-mercapto-propyl-trimethoxy-silane (PropS-SH) has shown that the thiolate bond leads to the formation of highly protective layers on copper and improves the adhesion of the coating to the surface, because the thiolate bond was found to be stronger than that of the oxane bond in other tested silane coatings (n-octadecyl-trimethoxy-silane (OctadecS), bis-trimethoxy-silyl-ethane (BTSE), phenyl-trimethoxy-silane (PhS)). PropS-SH film applied to gilded bronze proved to be effective in inhibiting galvanic corrosion. In terms of protective efficiency, Props-SH has good results not only on gilded, but also on pre-patinated by accelerated ageing bronze. When sprayed onto patinated with K_{2}S bronze samples, an inhibiting efficiency of 97% was achieved after 30 days of exposure to acid rain compared to Incralac, which obtained 89%. Two lines of research are working on the improvement of Props-SH behaviour when exposed to UV radiation and high temperature, which results in photo-oxidation and/or hydrolysis. The first one is the possibility of adding particulate material or nanoparticles as TiO_{2}, LaO_{3} or CeO_{2}. The second line of research focuses on the encapsulation of inhibitors such as Β-Cyclodextrin complexes into the layer to increase the protective ability of the coating.

== Preventive conservation ==
The items should be stored in rooms that are protected from polluted air, dust, ultraviolet radiation, and excessive relative humidity – ideal values are temperature of 16–20 °C and up to 40% (35–55% according to recent Canadian Conservation Institute recommendations) relative humidity, noting that if metal is combined with organic materials, relative humidity should not be below 45%. Archaeological objects must be stored in rooms (or plastic boxes) with very low relative humidity or, in the case of particularly valuable items, in the chambers with nitrogen or argon. Copper or copper alloy objects with active corrosion up to 35% RH. Shelves in the storerooms must be of stainless steel or chlorine and acetate-free plastic or powder-coated steel. Wood and wood-based products (particleboard, plywood) must be avoided. Also do not use rubber, felt, or wool. When you are handling metal objects, always wear clean cotton gloves . Lighting levels must be kept below 300 lux (up to 150 lux in case of lacquered or painted objects, up to 50 lux in case of objects with light sensitive materials).

== See also ==
- Conservation and restoration of metals
- Conservation and restoration of ferrous objects
- Conservation and restoration of glass objects
- Conservation and restoration of ivory objects
- Conservation and restoration of ceramic objects
- Conservation and restoration of silver objects
