= Serpierite =

Rare sky-blue coloured hydrated sulfate mineral

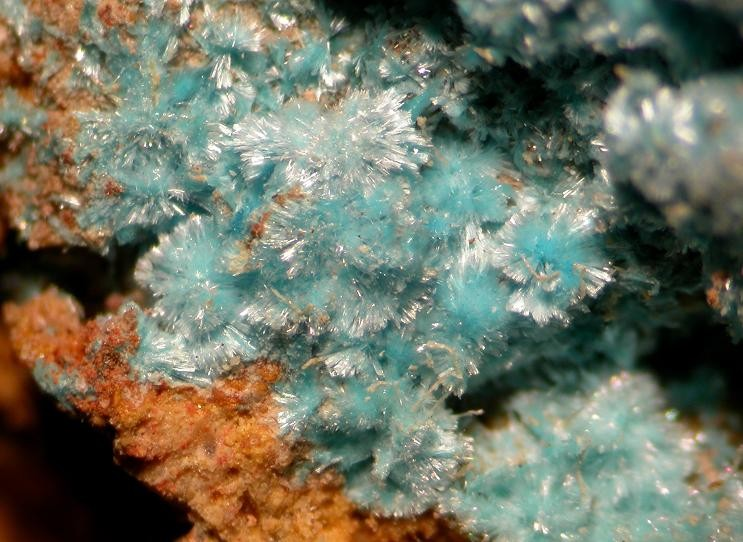
- Serpierite from the Genna zinc smelter, Germany (slag locality)

General
- Category: Sulfate mineral
- Formula: Ca(Cu,Zn)_{4}(SO_{4})_{2}(OH)_{6}·3H_{2}O
- IMA symbol: Spe
- Strunz classification: 7.DD.30 (10 ed.); VI/D.19-20 (8 ed.)
- Dana classification: 31.06.02.01
- Crystal system: Monoclinic
- Crystal class: Prismatic (2/m) (same H-M symbol)
- Space group: B2/b

Identification
- Formula mass: 644.32 g/mol
- Colour: Sky blue
- Crystal habit: Crusts and tufted aggregates of tiny lathlike crystals
- Cleavage: Perfect on {001}
- Fracture: Splintery
- Tenacity: Brittle
- Lustre: Vitreous, pearly on cleavages
- Streak: White, pale blue or greenish white
- Diaphaneity: Transparent
- Specific gravity: 3.07
- Optical properties: Biaxial (−)
- Refractive index: n_{α} = 1.58, n_{β} = 1.64, n_{γ} = 1.65
- Birefringence: 0.065, 0.0640
- Pleochroism: X = pale green; Y = bluish green; Z = bluish green
- Solubility: Soluble in acids
- Other characteristics: Serpierite is not radioactive

Serpierite (Ca(Cu,Zn)_{4}(SO_{4})_{2}(OH)_{6}·3H_{2}O) is a rare, sky-blue coloured hydrated sulfate mineral, often found as a post-mining product. It is a member of the devilline group, which has members aldridgeite (Cd,Ca)(Cu,Zn)_{4}(SO_{4})_{2}(OH)_{6}·3H_{2}O, campigliaite Cu_{4}Mn^{2+}(SO_{4})_{2}(OH)_{6}·4H_{2}O, devilline CaCu_{4}(SO_{4})_{2}(OH)_{6}·3H_{2}O, kobyashevite Cu_{5}(SO_{4})_{2}(OH)_{6}·4H_{2}O, lautenthalite PbCu_{4}(SO_{4})_{2}(OH)_{6}·3H_{2}O and an unnamed dimorph of devilline. It is the calcium analogue of aldridgeite and it is dimorphous with orthoserpierite CaCu_{4}(SO_{4})_{2}(OH)_{6}·3H_{2}O.

It was discovered in 1881 and named by Alfred Des Cloizeaux in honour of Giovanni Battista Serpieri. Serpieri was an Italian revolutionary, engineer and mining entrepreneur who developed mines in the Lavrion area of Greece and founded the Montecatini Company. He was born in Italy in 1832 and died in Greece in 1897.

== Crystallography ==
Serpierite is a hydrated sulfate with the formula Ca(Cu,Zn)_{4}(SO_{4})_{2}(OH)_{6}·3H_{2}O with molar mass 644.32 g and calculated density 3.08 g/cm^{3}. It belongs to the monoclinic crystal system, point group 2/m and space group C2/c. It is pseudo-orthorhombic and isostructural with aldridgeite.

The unit cell has side a of length 22.2 Å, side c of length 21.9 Å and the angle β between them equal to 113.4°. The third side b, which is perpendicular to both a and c, has length 6.25 Å. There are 8 formula units (Z = 8) per unit cell.

== Appearance ==
Serpierite is a sky-blue coloured mineral, with a white or almost white streak and a vitreous lustre, pearly on cleavages. It is transparent, and appears greenish-blue in transmitted light. No large crystals have been found. It occurs as tufts and crusted aggregates of lath-like or bladed crystals typically less than 1 mm long. These crystals are elongated along the crystallographic direction a, and flattened perpendicular to the c direction.

== Physical properties ==
Sources differ widely about the hardness of serpierite, giving values varying between 2 and 4. They all agree, however, that the specific gravity is 3.07, a very little less than the calculated value. Cleavage is perfect perpendicular to the c direction, which is the direction in which the crystals are flattened. The mineral is brittle and breaks with a splintery fracture. It is soluble in acids and it is not radioactive.

== Optical properties ==
Monoclinic crystals (and triclinic and orthorhombic crystals) have two directions in which light travels with zero birefringence; these directions are called the optic axes, and the crystal is said to be biaxial. The speed of a ray of light travelling through the crystal differs with direction. The direction of the fastest ray is called the X direction and the direction of the slowest ray is called the Z direction. X and Z are perpendicular to each other, and a third direction Y is defined as perpendicular to both X and Z; light travelling along Y has an intermediate speed. Refractive index is inversely proportional to speed, so the refractive indices for the X, Y and Z directions increase from X to Z. For serpierite the orientation with respect to the crystal axes a, b and c is Y = b, Z = c and X is inclined to an at angle 24°. The refractive indices are n_{α} = 1.58, n_{β} = 1.64, n_{γ} = 1.65.

The maximum birefringence δ is the difference between the highest and lowest refractive index; for serpierite δ = 0.065. The angle between the two optic axes is called the optic angle, 2V, and it is always acute, and bisected either by X or by Z. If Z is the bisector then the crystal is said to be positive, and if X is the bisector it is said to be negative. Serpierite is biaxial (-) and the measured value of 2V is 33° to 37°. Also 2V can be calculated from the values of the refractive indices, giving values close to the measured values; different sources give 34°, 37° and 37° +/- 6°. 2V depends on the refractive indices, but refractive index varies with wavelength, and hence with colour. So 2V also depends on the colour, and is different for red and for violet light. This effect is called dispersion of the optic axes, or just dispersion (not to be confused with chromatic dispersion). If 2V is greater for red light than for violet light the dispersion is designated r > v, and vice versa. For serpierite dispersion is strong, r > v.

The mineral is pleochroic; when viewed along the X direction it appears pale green, and bluish green along the Y and Z directions.

== Occurrence ==
The type locality is the Serpieri Mine, Kamariza, Lavrion District, Greece, and type material is conserved at the National Museum of Natural History, Paris, France, reference 73.38, 78.226. Serpierite is a secondary mineral found in altered smelter slags and oxidised sulfide veins. At the type locality it is associated with smithsonite and it has also been found associated with devilline, posnjakite, ktenasite, linarite, langite, brochantite, wroewolfeite, namuwite, schulenbergite, hydrozincite, malachite and gypsum.

== Localities ==
- Scatterings of sky blue serpierite needles have been collected in dump material from the Kintore and block 14 open cuts, Broken Hill, New South Wales, Australia as matted crusts and hemispherical sprays to 0.5 mm, with a silky lustre. The most commonly associated sulfate minerals are schulenbergite and brochantite, with less abundant antlerite, ktenasite and linarite. The serpierite contains appreciable zinc.
- At the Lloyd copper mine at Burraga, New South Wales, serpierite and langite together with other species coat the bed of an open adit that drains water affected by acid mine drainage from the open workings.
- At the Tynebottom Mine, Garrigill, Cumbria, England, post-mining deposits have been found containing serpierite as pale turquoise-blue radiating, usually flat, crusts of feathery needles with a silky lustre. Individual crystals are up to 0.5 mm long.
- At the Brownley Hill Mine, Alston Moor, Cumbria, England, serpierite occurs with harmotome and gypsum, and rarely with brochantite, in fractures in quartz lining of a large cavity in the Brownley Hill vein. The aggregates of blue lathlike crystals reach about 2 mm and appear to have been produced by post-mining oxidation of chalcopyrite.
- Serpierite is extremely rare at Red Gill, Caldbeck Fells, Cumbria, England, where it has been reported as soft, pale blue micaceous aggregates on cerussite. It is probably a dump formed mineral.
- Acicular serpierite crystals to 1 mm have been found at Neudorf in the Harz Mountains of Germany, as leafy pale blue iridescent crystals overgrown by gypsum and aragonite.
- At the old copper mine of Ross Island, Killarney, County Kerry, Ireland, specimens of serpierite were obtained from dump debris from a large water-logged hole called the Blue Hole. The ores worked in the Blue Hole were sphalerite, galena, pyrite and chalcopyrite. Smithsonite is “tolerably abundant”.
