= Langite =

Rare hydrated copper sulfate mineral

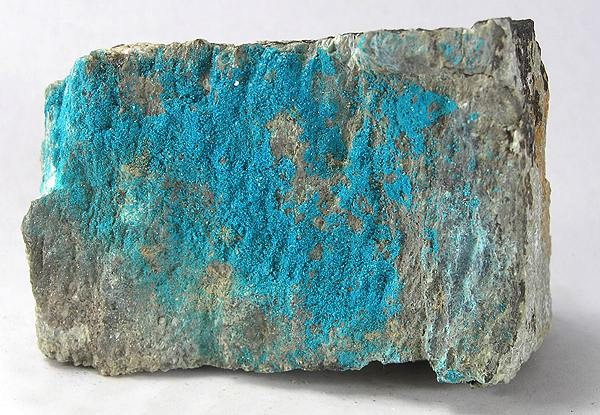
- Langite from Podlipa and Reinera Mines, Slovakia

General
- Category: Copper minerals
- Formula: Cu_{4}(SO_{4})(OH)_{6}·2H_{2}O
- IMA symbol: Lgt
- Strunz classification: 7.DD.10
- Dana classification: 31.4.3.1
- Crystal system: Monoclinic
- Crystal class: Domatic (m) (same H-M symbol)
- Space group: Pc
- Unit cell: a = 7.118, b = 6.031 c = 11.209 [Å] β = 90.00–90.02°; Z = 2

Identification
- Formula mass: 488.32 g/mol
- Color: Greenish blue, sky-blue to bluish green
- Crystal habit: Crystals scaly, or as crusts; earthy
- Twinning: Common on {110}, typically repeated
- Cleavage: {001} perfect, {010} distinct
- Fracture: Uneven
- Mohs scale hardness: 2.5 to 3
- Luster: Vitreous, crusts silky
- Streak: Blue green
- Diaphaneity: Translucent
- Specific gravity: 3.28 3.48 to 3.5 3.5 2.28 to 3.34
- Optical properties: Biaxial (−) r>v weak
- Refractive index: n_{α} = 1.708 n_{β} = 1.760 n_{γ} = 1.798
- Birefringence: δ = 0.090
- Pleochroism: X = c = light yellowish green Y = b = blue-green Z = a = sky blue
- Solubility: Insoluble in water, easily soluble in dilute acids or NH_{4}OH
- Other characteristics: May be altered to brochantite. Not radioactive

Langite is a rare hydrated copper sulfate mineral, with hydroxyl, found almost exclusively in druses of small crystals. It is formed from the oxidation of copper sulfides, and was first described in specimens from Cornwall, United Kingdom. It is dimorphous with wroewolfeite. Langite was discovered in 1864 and named after the physicist and crystallographer Viktor von Lang (1838–1921), who was Professor of Physics at the University of Vienna, Austria.

== Unit cell ==
Langite belongs to the monoclinic crystal class m, meaning that it has just one mirror plane, and no axes of rotational symmetry. The crystal is built up of identical unit cells stacked together, with no space in between. The unit cell for the monoclinic system has a base which is a rhombus, with sides a and c inclined at angle β. The third side b is perpendicular to both a and c. For langite the angle β is very close to 90°, so the unit cell is almost brick-shaped (as for the orthorhombic system). Different sources give slightly different values for the unit cell parameters, but they all fall within the ranges a = 7.118 Å to 7.137 Å, b = 6.031 Å to 6.034 Å, c = 11.209 Å to 11.217 Å, β = 90.00 to 90.02°, Z (the number of formula units per unit cell) = 2.

== Physical properties ==
Langite usually occurs as druses of small greenish-blue crystals which may be scaly or earthy. It is translucent, with a vitreous to silky luster and a blue-green streak. It has perfect cleavage perpendicular to the c crystal axis, and distinct cleavage perpendicular to b. Twinning is common, and typically repeated to give snowflake or star shaped groupings. The mineral is soft, with hardness 2.5 to 3, a little less than that of calcite. Fracture is uneven, and specific gravity is in the range 3.28 to 3.50, a little less than that of diamond.

== Optical properties ==
Langite is biaxial (−). Since it is monoclinic, it has three different refractive indices, corresponding to the three crystallographic directions. All the refractive indices are in the range 1.64 to 1.80, which is comparatively large, almost as high as garnet. Different sources give these values:

N_{x} = 1.641, N_{y} = 1.690, N_{z} = 1.712
N_{x} = 1.708, N_{y} = 1.760, N_{z} = 1.798
N_{x} = 1.641 to 1.654, N_{y} = 1.690 to 1.713, N_{z} = 1.705 to 1.722
N_{x} = 1.641, N_{y} = 1.690, N_{z} = 1.705 to 1.712

The mineral is pleochroic, with X light yellowish green, Y blue-green and Z sky blue.

== Occurrence ==
Langite is an uncommon but widespread secondary mineral in the oxidised zone of copper sulfide deposits, which may be of post-mine formation. It is associated with wroewolfeite, posnjakite, serpierite, devilline, chalcophyllite, connellite, brochantite, malachite and gypsum.

There are two type localities for langite, Fowey Consols, Tywardreath, Par Area, St Austell District, and St Just, St Just District, both in Cornwall, England. The type material is conserved at the Natural History Museum, Vienna, Austria, reference A.a.4353.

Other reported occurrences include:

- With serpierite coating the bed of a water course affected by acid mine drainage at the Lloyd Copper Mine at Burraga, New South Wales, Australia
- Intergrown with ktenasite forming fibrous and botryoidal crusts and coatings less than 0.1 mm thick, at the Kintore Open Cut, Broken Hill, New South Wales, Australia
- Associated with a new mineral mallestigite, reported in 2004, near Carinthia, Austria, on the dump of a copper-lead-zinc mine. The mallestigite formed in fractures during weathering of primary galena and tetrahedrite. Other associated minerals were anglesite, brochantite, linarite and schultenite
- At Silver Gill, Caldbeck Fells, Cumbria, England, partly altered to brochantite, Cu_{4}SO_{4}(OH)_{6}
- As microcrystals in small vugs in prehnite-quartz vein sections at the Clark Mine, Keweenaw Peninsula, Michigan, US
