= Lautenthalite =

Sulfate mineral

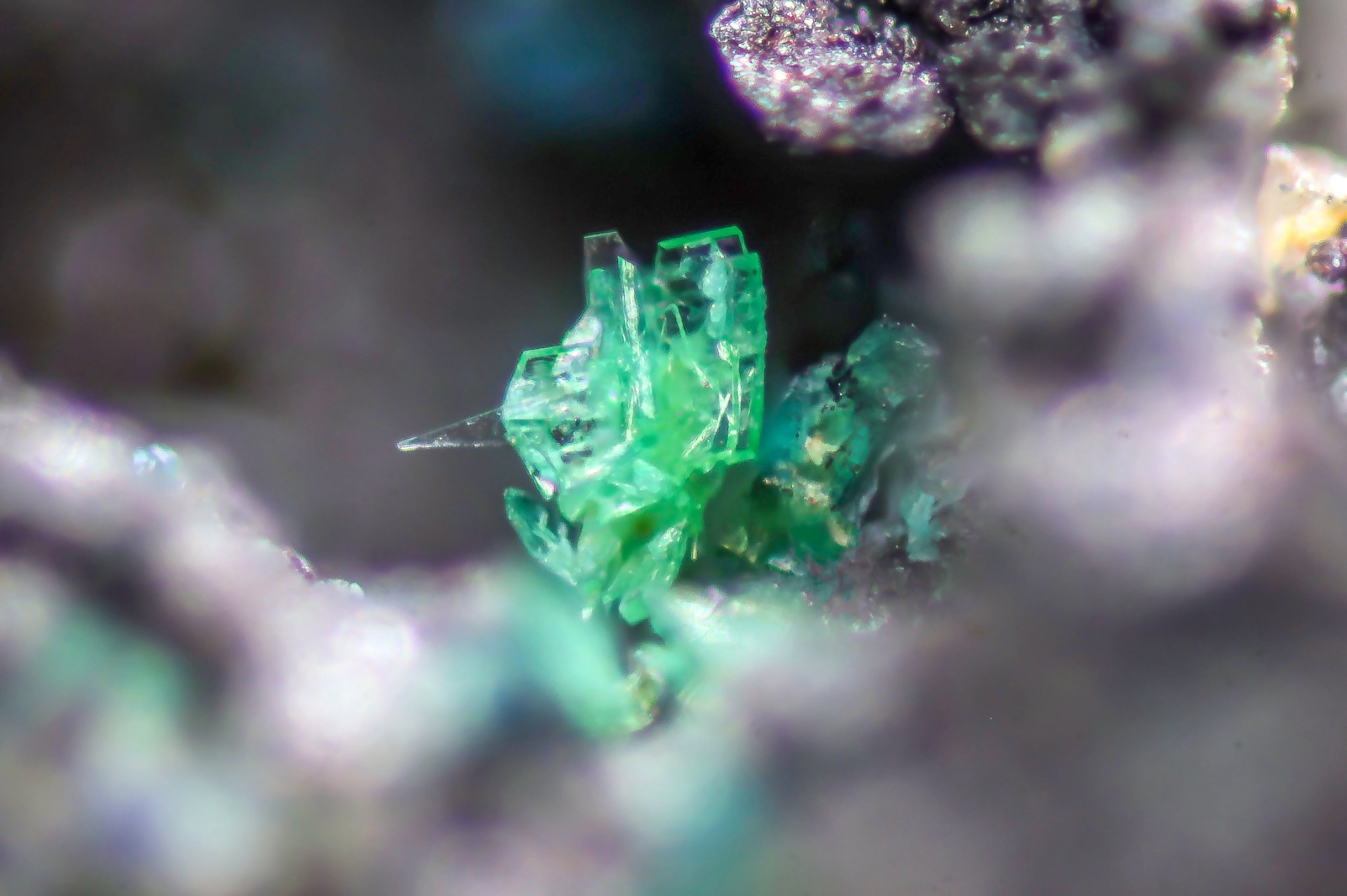

General
- Category: Minerals
- Formula: PbCu_{4}(SO_{4})_{2}(OH)_{6} · 3H_{2}O
- IMA symbol: Lth
- Strunz classification: 07.DE.70
- Dana classification: 31.06.01.02
- Crystal system: Monoclinic
- Crystal class: Prismatic; H-M symbol: (2/m)
- Space group: P2_{1}/b
- Unit cell: 2,799.47

Identification
- Color: Blue green, green, greenish blue
- Twinning: Polysynthetic on {100}
- Cleavage: Good on {001} and {010}, distinct
- Mohs scale hardness: 2.5
- Luster: Vitreous
- Streak: White
- Diaphaneity: Transparent
- Specific gravity: 3.84
- Density: 3.84
- Optical properties: Biaxial (−)
- Refractive index: n_{α} = 1.659(2) n_{β} = 1.703(2) n_{γ} = 1.732(2)
- Birefringence: 0.073
- Pleochroism: Weak
- 2V angle: 78° – 79°
- Dispersion: Strong, r < v

Lautenthalite is a mineral that was named after its location, Lautenthal, Harz mountains, Germany. It can be found in several slag localities. It was approved by the IMA in 1993. It is a member of the devilline group, and it is the lead analogue of devilline and campigliaite. Without analytical methods, it is hard to distinguish the mineral from both. It shows pleochroic properties, which is an optical phenomenon. Depending on which angle the mineral is inspected, the color of it differs. On the x optical axis, the mineral could be seen in a pale blue color; on the y and z axis, the mineral's color changes to blue. It has tabular crystals and sheaflike or irregular aggregates. Lautenthalite is associated with wroewolfeite, which it tends to overgrow. It is also associated with anglesite, devilline–serpierite, galena, linarite, brochantite and schulenbergite. It forms small singular crystals with a size of up to 0.5 × 0.3 × 0.03 mm.

== Chemical properties ==
Lautenthalite forms during the oxidation of copper, lead and zinc sulphides. It mostly consists of oxygen (33.60%), copper (31.40%) and lead (25.59%), but also contains sulfur (7.92%) and hydrogen (1.49%).
