= Fehrite =

Sulfate mineral

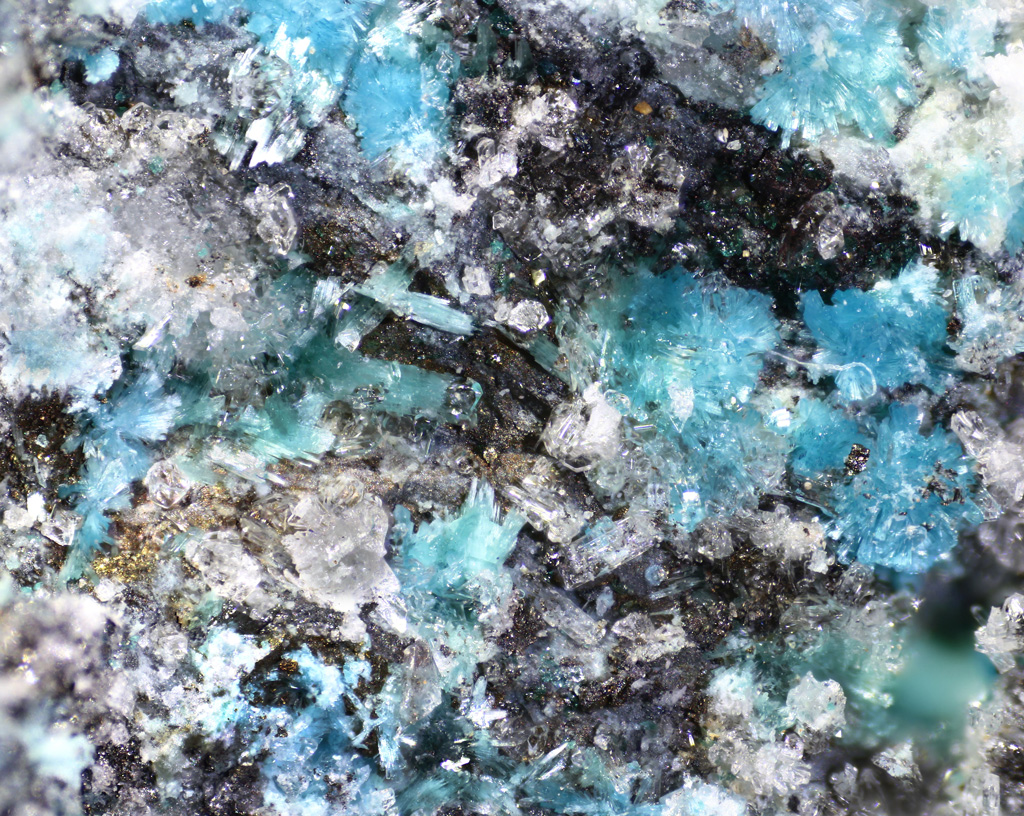
- Fehrite microcrystals. Mina de Les Ferreres, Rocabruna, Camprodón, Gerona (Spain)

General
- Category: Mineral sulfate
- Formula: MgCu₄(SO₄)₂(OH)₆·6H₂O
- IMA symbol: Feh
- Strunz classification: 7.DD.10
- Crystal system: monoclinic
- Crystal class: 2/m-Prismatic

Identification
- Color: turquoise blue
- Cleavage: Perfect on {001}
- Fracture: Irregular
- Tenacity: Brittle
- Density: turquoise blue

Fehrite is a hydroxyl-bearing, hydrated, copper-magnesium sulfate mineral approved by the International Mineralogical Association as a new species in 2019 and formally described in 2021 from specimens obtained from the Casualidad mine, located near Baños de Sierra Alhamilla, in Pechina (Almería), Spain, which is consequently the type locality. The name is a tribute to Karl Thomas Fehr, Professor of Mineralogy at the Ludwig-Maximilians-Universität München (LMU) in Germany.

== Properties ==
Fehrite is the only magnesium copper sulfate known so far. It is isostructural with ktenasite and gobelinite, with magnesium instead of zinc and cobalt. It is found as radiating aggregates of elongated, tabular, ribbon-like crystals with a maximum length of 200 μm. In addition to the elements of the formula, its composition includes significant proportions of Zn and traces of Mn.

== Deposits ==
Fehrite is a secondary mineral produced by the altering of sulfides. It seems to be a very rare mineral, and so far, it has only been found in two localities: At the type locality, the Casualidad mine, in Pechina (Almeria), Spain, it was seen as an alteration product of tetrahedrite. It is associated with kapellasite, connellite and serpierite. Its appearance is very similar to serpierite, in which the presence of slight greenish tones in the fehrite can be differentiated. In contrast, the colour of serpierite is sky blue, without green tones. It is also found in the Les Ferreres mine, Rocabruna, Camprodón (Gerona), Spain.
