= Asagiite =

Sulfate mineral

General
- Category: Mineral sulphate
- Formula: NiCu_{4}(SO_{4})_{2}(OH)_{6}·6H_{2}O
- IMA symbol: Asa
- Strunz classification: 7.DD.
- Crystal system: monoclinic
- Crystal class: 2/m-Prismatic

Identification
- Color: Pale blue-green
- Cleavage: Perfect on {001}
- Tenacity: brittle
- Mohs scale hardness: 2.5
- Luster: vitreous
- Streak: white
- Density: 2.90 g/cm^{3}
- Refractive index: 1.58,1.62,1.63
- Birefringence: 0.054
- 2V angle: 52^{o}

Asagiite is a rare hydrous nickel copper sulphate mineral, with the formula NiCu_{4}(SO_{4})_{2}(OH)_{6}·6H_{2}O. The mineral name was approved by the International Mineralogical Association in 2022, and the type description was published in 2023. It is isostructural with ktenasite, which has zinc in place of nickel.

Asagiite was first described from the Nakauri copper mine in Aichi prefecture, Japan, where it co-exists with the cobalt analogue of ktenasite, gobelinite. At this locality, platy crystals of asagiite are found as a secondary mineral in fractures in serpentinite, where they grow on aggregrates of smithsonite (ZnCO_{3}). Asagiite has subsequently been confirmed from several other locations, including the Cap Garonne mines of France, which is the type locality of gobelinite.

The mineral is named for its light blue colour, which in Japanese is asagi-iro.
