= Posnjakite =

Hydrated copper sulfate mineral

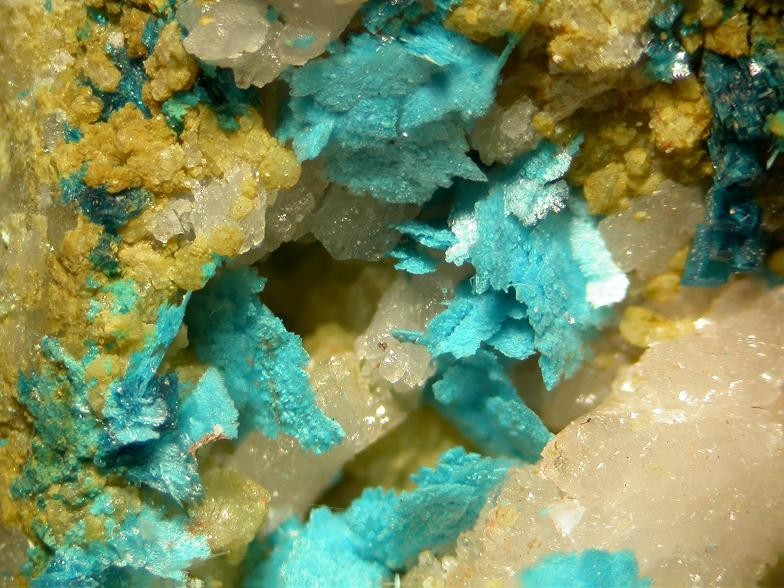
- Posnjakite from Špania Dolina in Slovakia

General
- Category: Copper minerals
- Formula: Cu_{4}[(OH)_{6}|SO_{4}] • H_{2}O
- IMA symbol: Pnk
- Strunz classification: 7.DD.10
- Dana classification: 31.4.1.1
- Crystal system: Monoclinic
- Crystal class: Domatic (m) (same H-M symbol)
- Space group: Pa
- Unit cell: a = 10.578 Å, b = 6.345 Å, c = 7.863 Å; β = 117.98°; Z = 2

Identification
- Formula mass: 488.32 g/mol
- Color: Sky-blue to dark-blue
- Crystal habit: Crystals scaly, or as crusts; earthy
- Mohs scale hardness: 2 to 3
- Luster: Vitreous
- Refractive index: n_{α} = 1.625 n_{β} = 1.680 n_{γ} = 1.706

Posnjakite is a hydrated copper sulfate mineral. It was discovered in the Tungsten deposit of Nura-Taldy in Karaganda Region in Kazakhstan and described in 1967 by Aleksandr Ivanovich Komkov (1926–1987) and Yevgenii Ivanovich Nefedov (1910–1976) and named after geochemist Eugene Valdemar Posnjak (1888–1949).

== Occurrence ==
Posnjakite is an uncommon but widespread secondary mineral in the oxidised zone of copper sulfide deposits, which may be of post-mine formation. It is associated with brochantite, langite, devilline, serpierite, woodwardite, wroewolfeite, aurichalcite, azurite, malachite and chalcopyrite.
