= Caledonite =

Mineral

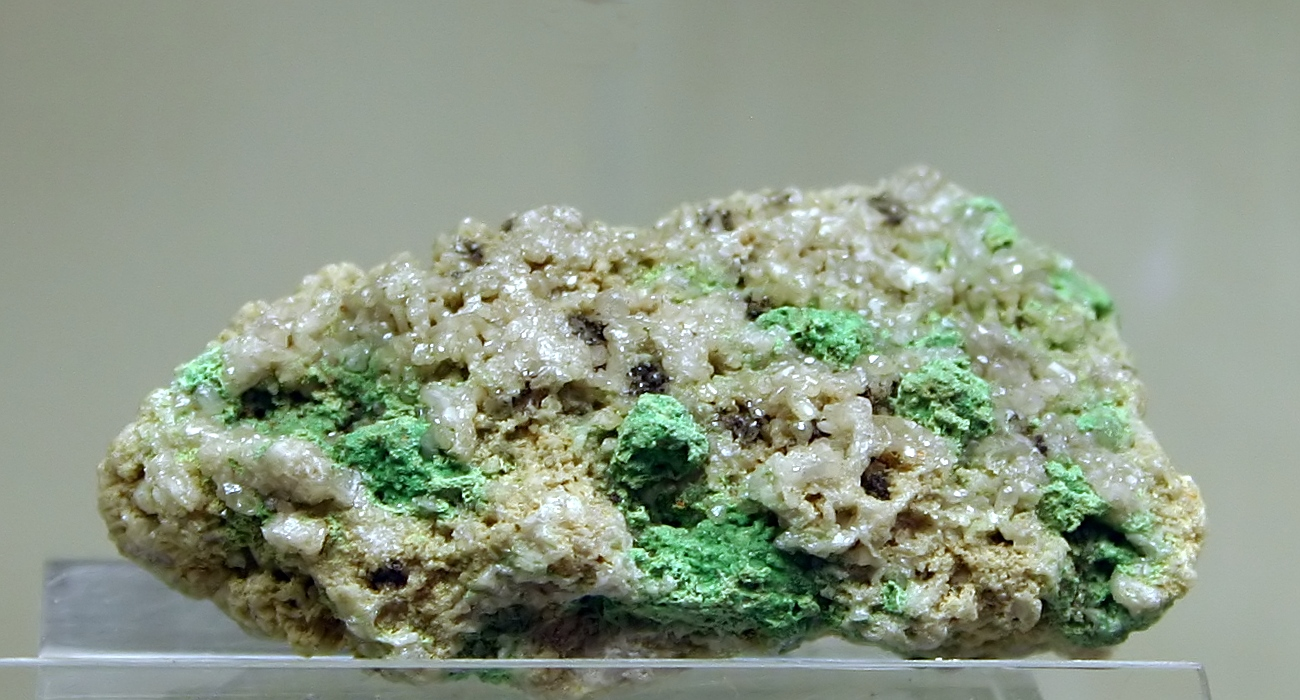
- Caledonite (green) on cerussite

General
- Category: Sulfate minerals
- Formula: Cu_{2}Pb_{5}(OH)_{6}CO_{3}(SO_{4})_{3}
- IMA symbol: Cdo
- Strunz classification: 7.BC.50
- Crystal system: Orthorhombic
- Crystal class: Pyramidal (mm2) (same H-M symbol)
- Space group: Pmn2_{1}
- Unit cell: a = 20.089(7) Å, b = 7.146(3) Å, c = 6.56 Å; Z = 2

Identification
- Color: Blue; green
- Crystal habit: Typically striated prismatic or tabular crystals; radial aggregates
- Cleavage: [001] perfect; [100] distinct
- Fracture: Uneven
- Tenacity: Brittle
- Mohs scale hardness: 2.5–3
- Luster: Vitreous
- Streak: Green-white; blue-green
- Diaphaneity: Transparent to translucent
- Specific gravity: 5.6–5.8
- Optical properties: Biaxial (−)
- Refractive index: n_{α} = 1.818(3) n_{β} = 1.866(3) n_{γ} = 1.909(3)
- Birefringence: δ = 0.091
- Pleochroism: Weak
- 2V angle: Measured: 85°

Caledonite, whose name derives from Caledonia, the historical name of its place of discovery (Scotland), is a richly colored blue-green sulfate-carbonate mineral of lead and copper with an orthorhombic crystal structure. It is an uncommon mineral found in the oxidized zones of copper-lead deposits.

== Properties ==
Although it contains copper and lead, it is a secondary mineral and is not prevalent enough in any known deposits to be used as an ore. Caledonite, when developed into full crystals, can have a deep blue-green color reminiscent of secondary copper minerals. Its high lustre, on the other hand, is more like secondary lead minerals. Localities in which caledonite occurs as well developed crystals are quite rare and include the Mammoth-St. Anthony Mine at Tiger, Arizona, a few mines in California, such as the Reward Mine. A few other mines in Arizona and Chile have been known to produce samples.

== Associated minerals ==
Given that caledonite is found in oxidized copper/lead deposits, it is frequently found in association with other copper and lead minerals. Frequently associated minerals include: linarite, malachite, cerussite, brochantite, anglesite, leadhillite, and azurite.

== Notes for identification ==
Caledonite's blue color is a useful indicator, but insufficient, especially since one of its associates, linarite, is a vivid blue as well. Useful tests for determining if a specimen is caledonite include its density, streak, and crystal habit.
