= Devilline =

Sulfate mineral

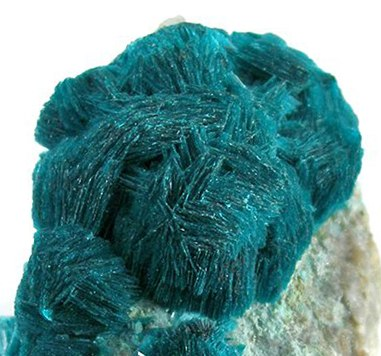
- Devilline

General
- Category: Sulfate minerals
- Formula: CaCu_{4}(SO_{4})_{2}(OH)_{6}·3(H_{2}O)
- IMA symbol: Dev
- Strunz classification: 7.DD.30
- Crystal system: Monoclinic
- Crystal class: Prismatic (2/m) (same H-M symbol)
- Space group: P2_{1}/c
- Unit cell: a = 20.870, b = 6.135 c = 22.91 [Å], β = 102.73° V = 2,861.23 Å^{3}

Identification
- Color: Green, blueish green; green in transmitted light
- Crystal habit: Prismatic, lamellar, platy pseudohexagonal crystals
- Twinning: On {010}
- Cleavage: Perfect (001) distinct (110) and (101)
- Tenacity: Brittle
- Mohs scale hardness: 2.5
- Luster: Vitreous, pearly
- Streak: Light green
- Density: Measured: 3.13 g/cm^{3} Calculated: 3.084 g/cm^{3}
- Optical properties: biaxial negative
- Refractive index: n_{α}=1.585, n_{β}=1.649, n_{γ}=1.660
- Birefringence: δ=0.075
- Pleochroism: Visible
- 2V angle: 42°
- Solubility: Insoluble in water and concentrated H_{2}SO_{4}. Completely soluble in HNO_{3}.

Devilline is a sulfate mineral with the chemical formula CaCu_{4}(SO_{4})_{2}(OH)_{6}·3H_{2}O. The name originates from the French chemist's name, Henri Etienne Sainte-Claire Deville (1818–1881).

Devilline crystallizes in the monoclinic system. Crystallographically, it contains three vectors of unequal lengths and two pairs of vectors are perpendicular while the other pair makes an angle other than 90°. Devilline is prismatic and belongs to the crystal class 2/m. This mineral belongs to the space group P 2_{1}/c. Devilline is an anisotropic mineral, meaning that the mineral has different properties in different directions. Optically, this mineral is biaxial negative, meaning that it contains two optic axes. Devilline has a moderate mineral relief. Mineral relief refers to the way a mineral appears to stand out when viewed under polarized light and it is dependent on the mineral's index of refraction.

Devilline is a rare and unusual secondary mineral found in the oxidized portions of copper sulfide ore deposits. Because Devilline occurs in such oxidation zones, this mineral often is of post-mining origin. Devilline is found in mines all around the world.

== Devilline group ==
Devilline group minerals are monoclinic sulfates.

| Mineral | Chemical formulae | Crystal system |
|---|---|---|
| Campigliaite | Cu_{4}Mn^{2+}(SO_{4})_{2}(OH)_{6}·4H_{2}O | Monoclinic |
| Devilline | CaCu_{4}(SO_{4})_{2}(OH)_{6}·3H_{2}O | Monoclinic |
| Kobyashevite | Cu_{5}(SO_{4})_{2}(OH)_{6}·4H_{2}O | Triclinic |
| Ktenasite | Zn(Cu,Zn)_{4}(SO_{4})_{2}(OH)_{6}·6H_{2}O | Monoclinic |
| Lautenthalite | PbCu_{4}(SO_{4})_{2}(OH)_{6}·3H_{2}O | Monoclinic |
| Serpierite | Ca(Cu,Zn)_{4}(SO_{4})_{2}(OH)_{6}·3H_{2}O | Monoclinic |
