= Antler Mine =

Former copper mine in Mohave County, Arizona

Coordinates: 34.8828°N 113.9689°W

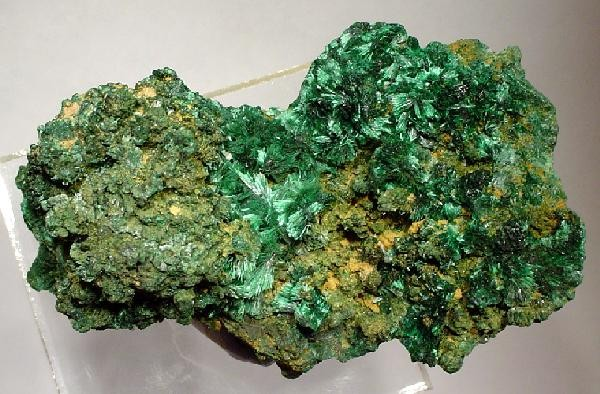
Antlerite, a mineral first discovered at the Antler Mine

Antler Mine, also known as Vendetta Mine, is a former copper and zinc drift mine in the Hualapai Mountains of Cedar Valley District, Mohave County, Arizona, United States. It is notable as the location where antlerite was first discovered, and was the source for the mineral's name.

The deposit was discovered in 1879, and the claim patented in 1894. The Antler Mine itself opened in 1916 and was sporadically exploited until 1970, with the most productive period lasting from 1943 to 1954. During its active period, the mine produced 78,251 tons of copper-zinc sulfide ore, from an estimated deposit size of 350,000 to 400,000 tons of volcanogenic 1–4% copper / 1–2% zinc ore, along with small amounts of lead sulfide, silver, and gold.

The mine itself comprises drifts on eight levels with a cumulative length of 6,600 ft, with a single deeply-inclined 650 ft shaft, arranged to exploit a roughly 2,000 ft tabular copper and zinc sulfide deposit running from 20º North to 30º East, into the Wabayuma Peak Wilderness Study Area. The area around Antler Mine includes several other notable mineral deposits, including those exploited by the Copper World Mine and the Boriana Canyon and Bull Canyon, Arizona deposits.

While the land is managed by the Bureau of Land Management, the mineral rights for Antler mine were purchased by Standard Metals Incorporated in 1987. The mine has remained defunct, in part because of an assessment by Standard Metals that declared the mine inaccessible due to both toxic levels of hydrogen sulfide gas, and the hoist having been rendered inoperable since the mine's closure.
