= Niedermayrite =

Sulfate mineral

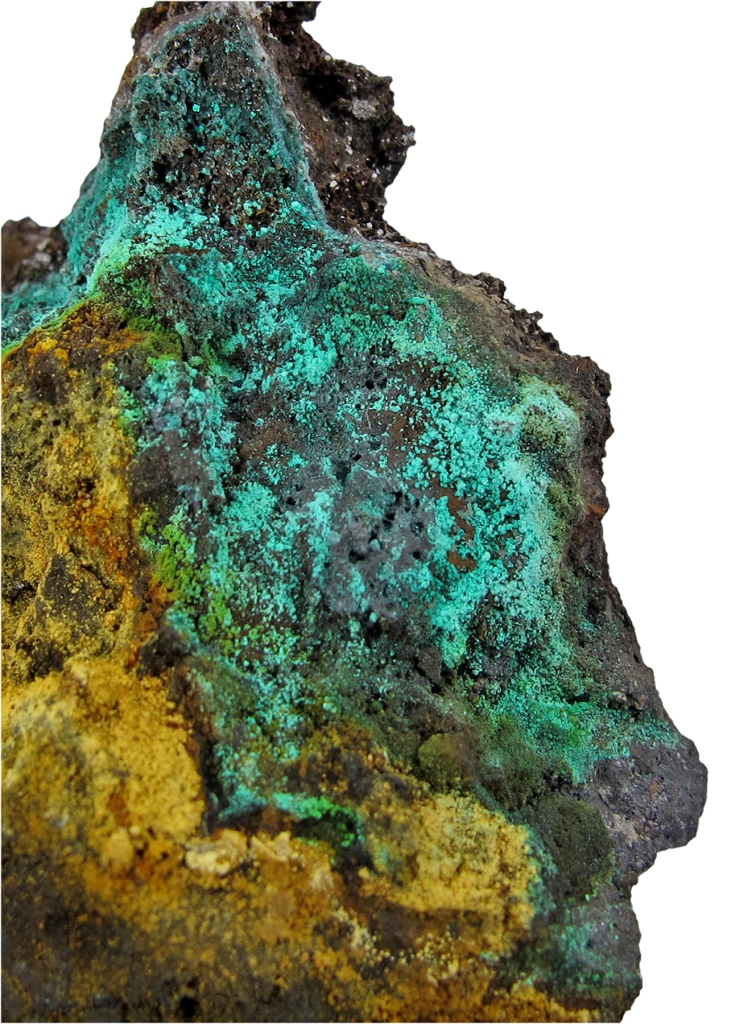

General
- Category: Sulfate mineral
- Formula: Cu_{4}Cd(SO_{4})_{2}(OH)_{6}·4H_{2}O
- IMA symbol: Ndm
- Strunz classification: 7.DD.30
- Crystal system: Monoclinic
- Crystal class: Prismatic (2/m) (same H-M symbol)
- Space group: P2_{1}/m
- Unit cell: a = 5.543(1), b = 21.995(4) c = 6.079(1) [Å]; β = 92.04(3)°; Z = 2

Identification
- Color: Bluish green
- Crystal habit: Platy euhedral crystals and as green crusts
- Cleavage: Perfect on {010}
- Tenacity: Brittle
- Luster: Vitreous
- Streak: White
- Diaphaneity: Transparent
- Specific gravity: 3.292
- Optical properties: Biaxial (-)
- Refractive index: nα = 1.599 - 1.619 nβ = 1.642 nγ = 1.661
- Birefringence: δ = 0.062
- 2V angle: Measured: 84°

Niedermayrite is a rare hydrated copper cadmium sulfate hydroxide mineral with formula: Cu_{4}Cd(SO_{4})_{2}(OH)_{6}·4H_{2}O. It crystallizes in the monoclinic system and occurs as encrustations and well formed vitreous blue-green prismatic crystals. It has a specific gravity of 3.36.

Niedermayrite was named for Gerhard Niedermayr (born 1941), an Austrian mineralogist affiliated with the Naturhistorisches Museum in Vienna, Austria. It was first described in 1998 from a mine in the Lavrion District, Attica, Greece. It is also reported from the Ophir District, Tooele County, Utah. The environment is in brecciated marble, the cadmium dominant analogue of campigliaite. In 2020, it was found in Tsumeb, Namibia.
