= Gobelinite =

Sulfate mineral

- Lath-shaped pale-green crystals of gobelinite from Cap Garonne, France. Field of view is 1 mm. Photo: Pierre Clolus. Collection: Valérie Galea-Clolus.

General
- Category: Mineral sulphate
- Formula: CoCu_{4}(SO_{4})_{2}(OH)_{6}·6H_{2}O
- IMA symbol: Gob
- Strunz classification: 7.DD.10
- Crystal system: monoclinic
- Crystal class: 2/m-Prismatic

Identification
- Color: Pale green, bluish green, greyish green
- Cleavage: none observed
- Fracture: irregular/uneven
- Tenacity: brittle
- Mohs scale hardness: 2.5
- Luster: vitreous, pearly
- Streak: white
- Density: 2.95 g/cm^{3}
- Refractive index: 1.58,1.62,1.63
- Birefringence: 0.054
- Pleochroism: strong
- 2V angle: 58^{o}
- Dispersion: weak

Gobelinite is a rare hydrous cobalt copper sulphate mineral, with the formula CoCu_{4}(SO_{4})_{2}(OH)_{6}·6H_{2}O. The mineral name was approved by the International Mineralogical Association in 2018, and the type description was published in 2020. It is isostructural with ktenasite, which has zinc in place of cobalt.

Gobelinite was first described from the Cap Garonne copper lead mine in Var, France, and the Eisenzecher Zug mine near Siegen in Germany, where it forms as an acid weathering product of sulphide minerals such as cobaltite (CoAsS), gersdorffite (NiAsS) or tennantite Cu_{6}[Cu_{4}(Fe,Zn)_{2}]As_{4}S_{13}.

Gobelinite has subsequently been found in other locations around the world, including at the Nakauri copper mine in Aichi prefecture, Japan, where is co-exists with the nickel analogue of ktenasite, asagiite.

The name gobelinite was coined in reference to the German word "kobold" and to the Old French term "gobelin", meaning goblin. These terms were used by early miners in Germany and France to describe cobalt ore, and superstitions around the evil creatures which would poison silver ores, and make miners sick.
