= Historic value =

Historic value (or historical value) is an increase in value because of historical aging. Original materials and signs of craftsmanship are important to historic value, while later-date changes can diminish it.

== Records and documents ==
With regard to items like library records or written documents, historical value can mean that the item contains "unique information, regardless of age, which provides understanding of some aspect of the government and promotes the development of an informed and enlightened citizenry."

== Real property ==
The increase in the value of a property, due to its historic value is based on the property's age, quality, and rarity. A property's historic value may be due to being associated with a historical activity, event, period, or person, or it may have particular historical architectural properties.

== Art-historic value ==
In art, historic value is sometimes called art-historic value. This is independent of a work's aesthetic value and is based on it being an important part of art history.
