= Ilvaite =

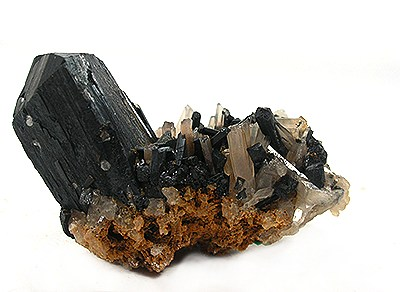

General
- Category: Sorosilicates
- Formula: Ca(Fe^{2+})_{2}Fe^{3+}[O|OH|Si_{2}O_{7}]
- IMA symbol: Ilv
- Strunz classification: 9.BE.07
- Crystal system: Monoclinic
- Crystal class: Prismatic (2/m) (same H-M symbol)
- Space group: P2_{1}/a

Identification
- Mohs scale hardness: 5.5–6.0
- Streak: black
- Specific gravity: 3.8–4.1

Ilvaite is a sorosilicate of iron and calcium with formula: CaFe^{2+}_{2}Fe^{3+}Si_{2}O_{7}O(OH). Both manganese and magnesium substitute in the structure. Ilvaite crystallizes in the monoclinic system in black prismatic crystals and columnar masses. It is black to brownish black to gray and opaque. It has a Mohs hardness of 5.5 to 6 and a specific gravity of 3.8 to 4.1. Ilvaite is structurally related to lawsonite.

It occurs in contact metamorphic rocks and skarn ore deposits. It also occurs less commonly in syenites.

Ilvaite was first described in 1811 on the island of Elba and the name ilvaite from the Latin name Ilva of the island. Sometimes referred to as yenite.
