= Antlerite =

Copper sulfate mineral

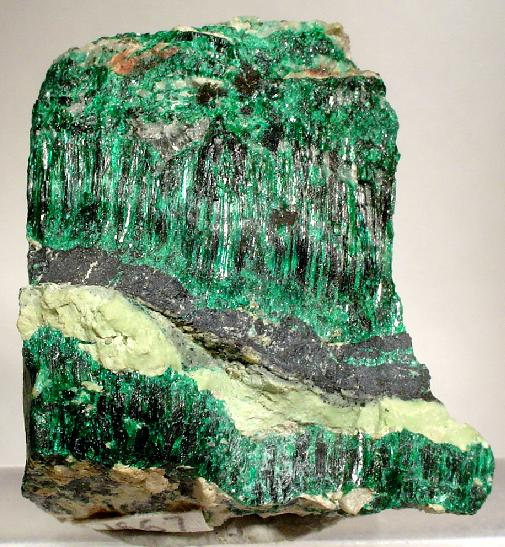
- A vein of acicular, green antlerite crystals from Chuquicamata, Chile (dimensions: 3.5 × 3.4 × 1.8 cm)

General
- Category: Sulfate minerals
- Formula: Cu_{3}(SO_{4})(OH)_{4}
- IMA symbol: Atl
- Strunz classification: 7.BB.15
- Crystal system: Orthorhombic
- Crystal class: Dipyramidal (mmm); H-M symbol: (2/m 2/m 2/m)
- Space group: Pnma

Identification
- Color: Bright green, through darker greens to black
- Crystal habit: Tabular and acicular or fibrous. Also found as reniform, massive or granular specimens
- Cleavage: Perfect on [010]
- Fracture: Uneven
- Mohs scale hardness: 3 to 3.5
- Luster: Vitreous
- Streak: Pale green
- Diaphaneity: Translucent
- Specific gravity: 3.9
- Optical properties: Biaxial (+)
- Refractive index: nα = 1.726 nβ = 1.738 nγ = 1.789
- Pleochroism: x: yellowish green y: bluish green z: bluish green

Antlerite is a greenish hydrous copper sulfate mineral, with the formula Cu_{3}(SO_{4})(OH)_{4}. It occurs in tabular, acicular, or fibrous crystals with a vitreous luster. Originally believed to be a rare mineral, antlerite was found to be the primary ore of the oxidised zones in several copper mines across the world, including the Chuquicamata mine in Chile, and the Antler mine in Arizona, US from which it takes its name. It is chemically and optically similar in many respects to other copper minerals such as malachite and brochantite, though it can be distinguished from the former by a lack of effervescence in hydrochloric acid.

Antlerite is a common corrosion product on bronze sculptures located in urban areas, where atmospheric sulfur dioxide (a common pollutant) is present. Antlerite forms mainly in sheltered areas where weathering is low, which permits accumulation of copper ions and enhancement in the acidity of water films. In exposed areas, the main corrosion product is brochantite.

Antlerite specimens

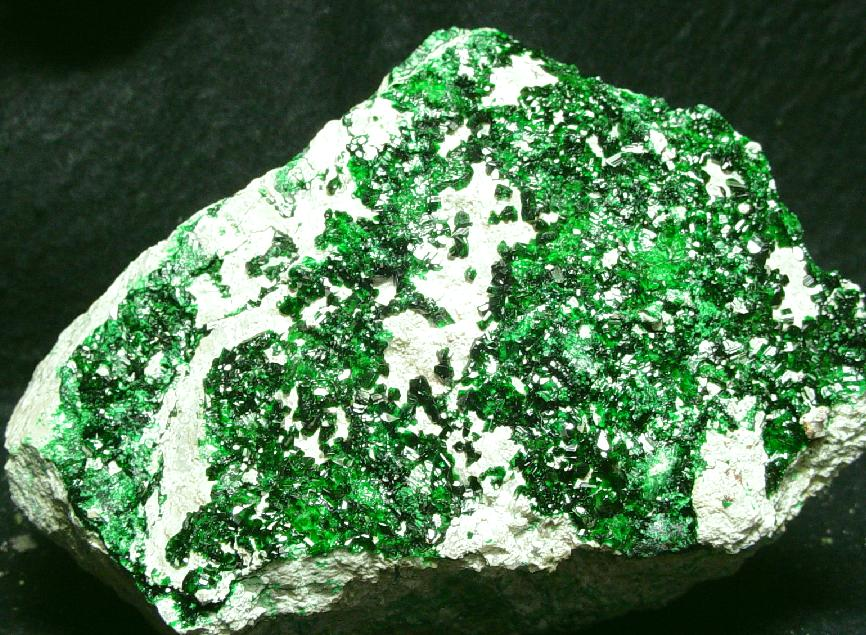
Antlerite crystals on white matrix, Chuquicamata mine, Chile

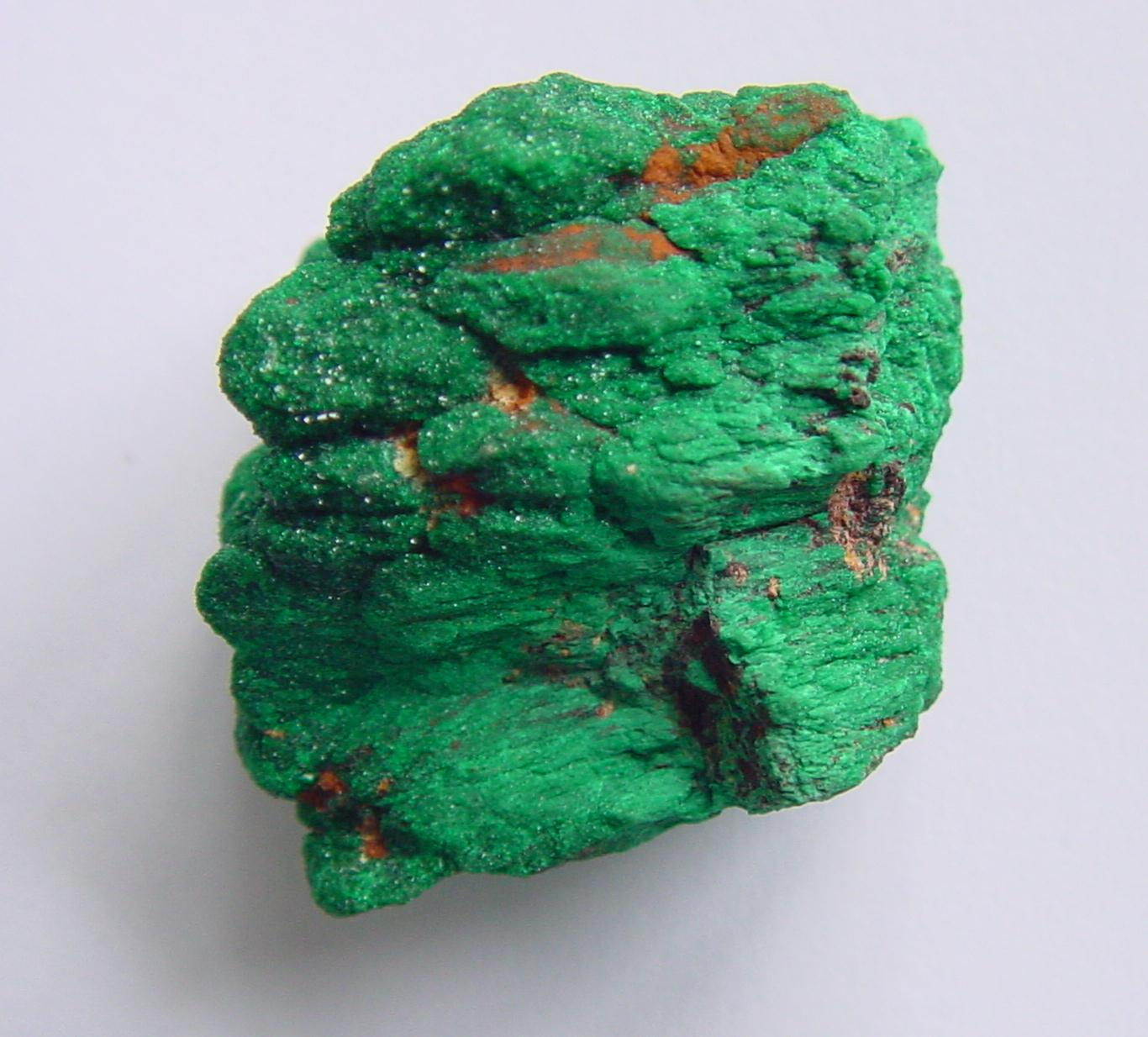
Antlerite, Lady Fanny Group, Brushy Park Station, Queensland, Australia

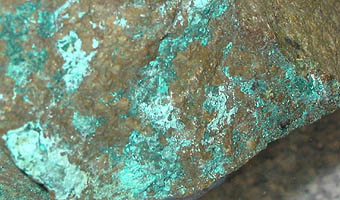
Antlerite, Piesky, Slovakia
