= Campigliaite =

Copper and manganese sulfate mineral

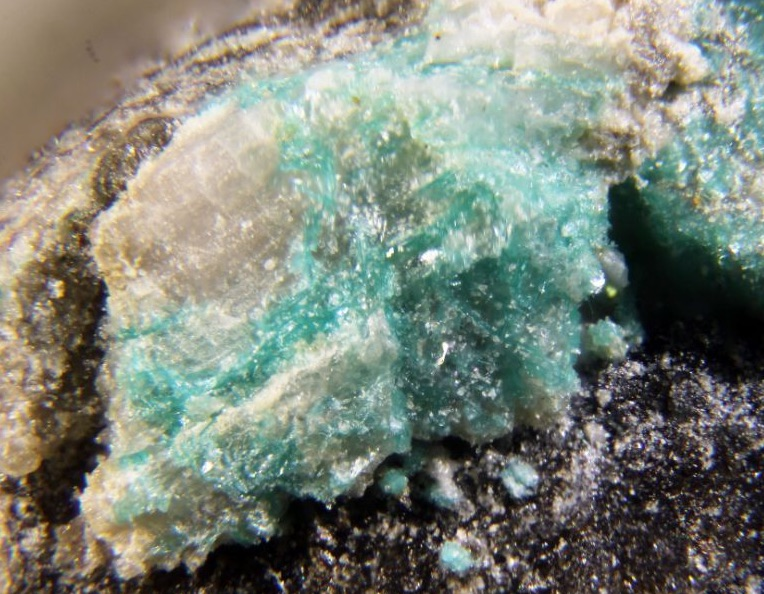

General
- Category: Copper oxysalt mineral
- Formula: Cu_{4}Mn(SO_{4})_{2}(OH)_{6}·4H_{2}O
- IMA symbol: Cpg
- Strunz classification: 7.DD.30
- Crystal system: Monoclinic
- Crystal class: Spheroidal (2) (same H-M symbol)
- Space group: C2
- Unit cell: a = 21.7 Å, b = 6.09 Å, c = 11.24 Å; β = 100.3°; Z = 4

Identification
- Color: Pale blue to pale greenish blue
- Crystal habit: Typically as clusters or tufts of elongated or bladed crystals
- Twinning: Polysynthetic, with {100} as twin plane, ubiquitous
- Cleavage: Perfect on {100}
- Luster: Vitreous
- Specific gravity: 3.0
- Optical properties: Biaxial (−)
- Refractive index: n_{α} = 1.589 n_{β} = 1.645 n_{γ} = 1.659
- Birefringence: δ = 0.070
- 2V angle: 52° measured
- Dispersion: r < v, weak

Campigliaite is a copper and manganese sulfate mineral with a chemical formula of Cu_{4}Mn(SO_{4})_{2}(OH)_{6}·4H_{2}O. It has a chemical formula and also a crystal structure similar to niedermayrite, with Cd(II) cation replacing by Mn(II). The formation of campigliaite is related to the oxidation of sulfide minerals to form sulfate solutions with ilvaite associated with the presence of manganese. Campigliaite is a rare secondary mineral formed when metallic sulfide skarn deposits are oxidized. While there are several related associations, there is no abundant source for this mineral due to its rare process of formation. Based on its crystallographic data and chemical formula, campigliaite is placed in the devillite group and considered the manganese analogue of devillite. Campigliaite belongs to the copper oxysalt minerals as well followed by the subgroup M=M-T sheets. The infinite sheet structures that campigliaite has are characterized by strongly bonded polyhedral sheets, which are linked in the third dimension by weaker hydrogen bonds.

== History ==
S. Menchetti and C. Sabelli discovered campigliaite in one of the side tunnels of the Temperino Mine in Campiglia Marittima, Tuscany, Italy. The new mineral was named after its type locality and was approved by the Commission of New Minerals and Mineral Names, International Mineralogical Association.

== Structure ==
When tested with a Weissenberg camera and single-crystal diffractometer, campigliaite is found to be twinned with the (100) as its twinning plane. Campigliaite is monoclinic with a point group of 2 and space group of C2. The infinite sheet structures that campigliaite has are characterized by strongly bonded sheets of polyhedra which are linked in the third dimension by the weaker hydrogen bonds.

== Physical properties ==
Campigliaite crystals are transparent with a vitreous luster. Crystals of campigliaite and gypsum are often mixed but small amounts of pure crystals appear to grow on gypsum. Campigliaite crystals are flattened on the {100} and elongated on the [010]. These crystals are light or pale blue in color but under light transmission, the crystal color changes to pale greenish blue. The measured density was 3.0 g cm^{−3} by heavy-liquid method but this is uncertain due to the size of the crystals. The calculated density was 3.063 g cm^{−3} with a normalized empirical formula of 7 H_{2}O.

== Geologic occurrence ==
The formation of campigliaite is related to the oxidation of sulfide minerals to form sulfate solutions with ilvaite associated with the presence of manganese. Campigliaite is closely associated with gypsum because of the geologic processes that form campigliaite.

In addition to the type locality, campigliaite has also been reported from the Biccia Mine in Alessandria Province, Piedmont, Italy, and from the Deer Trail Mine of the Tushar Mountains of Piute County, Utah, US.
