= Linarite =

Copper lead sulfate hydroxide mineral

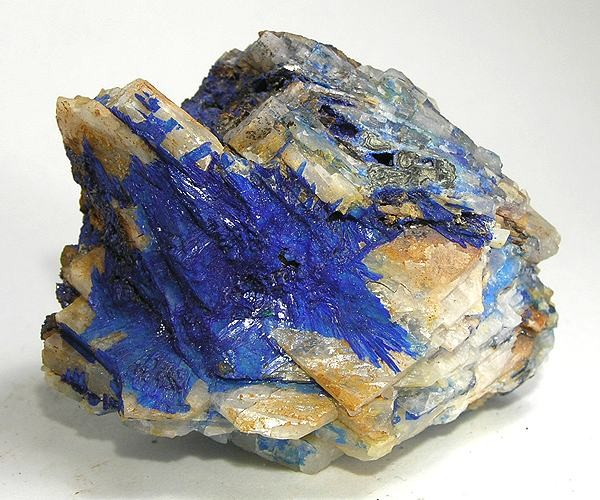

General
- Category: Sulfate minerals
- Formula: PbCu[(OH)_{2}|SO_{4}]
- IMA symbol: Lna
- Strunz classification: 7.BC.65
- Crystal system: Monoclinic
- Crystal class: Prismatic (2/m) (same H-M symbol)
- Space group: P2_{1}/m
- Unit cell: a = 9.701(2), b = 5.65 c = 4.69 [Å]; β = 102.65°; Z = 2

Identification
- Color: Deep azure blue
- Crystal habit: Crystals elongated and tabular; in crusts and aggregates
- Twinning: Common on {100}, also on {001}
- Cleavage: Perfect on {100}, imperfect on {001}
- Fracture: Conchoidal
- Mohs scale hardness: 2.5
- Luster: Sub-adamantine, vitreous
- Streak: Pale blue
- Diaphaneity: Transparent, translucent
- Specific gravity: 5.3 – 5.5
- Optical properties: Biaxial (−)
- Refractive index: n_{α} = 1.809 n_{β} = 1.838 n_{γ} = 1.859
- Birefringence: δ = 0.050
- Pleochroism: X = pale blue; Y = blue; Z = Prussian blue
- 2V angle: Measured: 80°

Linarite is a somewhat rare, crystalline mineral that is known among mineral collectors for its unusually intense, pure blue color. It is formed by the oxidation of galena and chalcopyrite and other copper sulfides. It is a combined copper lead sulfate hydroxide with formula PbCuSO_{4}(OH)_{2}. Linarite occurs as monoclinic prismatic to tabular crystals and irregular masses. It is easily confused with azurite, but does not react with dilute hydrochloric acid as azurite does. It has a Mohs hardness of 2.5 and a specific gravity of 5.3 – 5.5.

Linarite was first identified in 1822. It is named after the Linares Plateau, Spain. It occurs in association with brochantite, anglesite, caledonite, leadhillite, cerussite, malachite and hemimorphite.

== Gallery ==
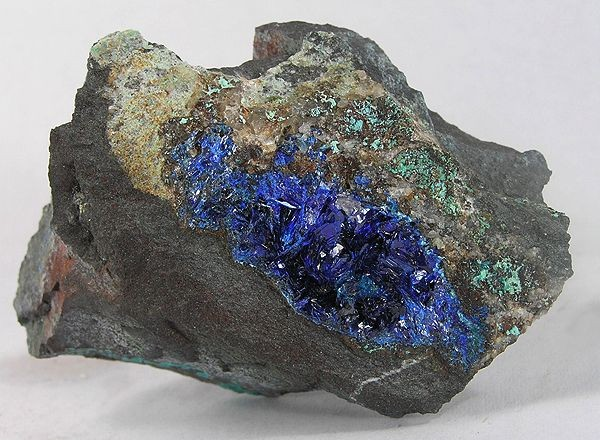
A shallow pocket of crystals of an intense cobalt blue, from Darwin, Darwin District, Inyo County, California, US

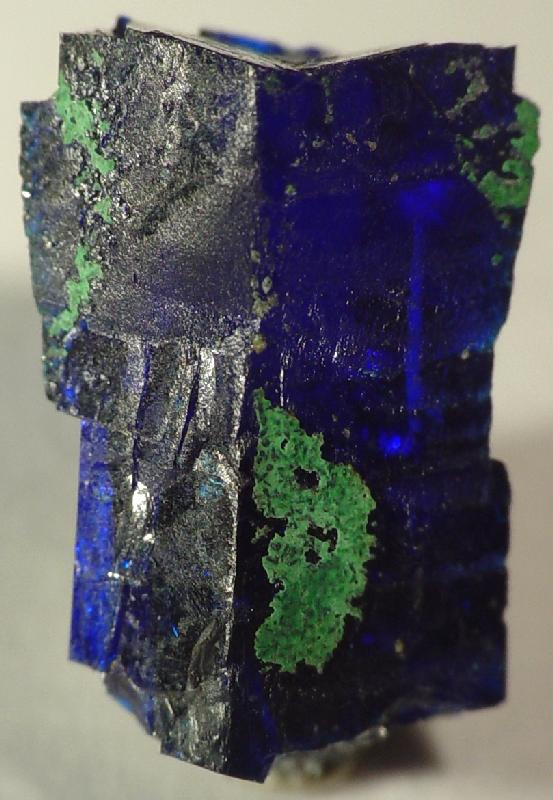
Linarite with malachite, Blanchard Mine, Hansonburg District, Socorro County, New Mexico US (Size: 1.1 × 0.8 × 0.4 cm)

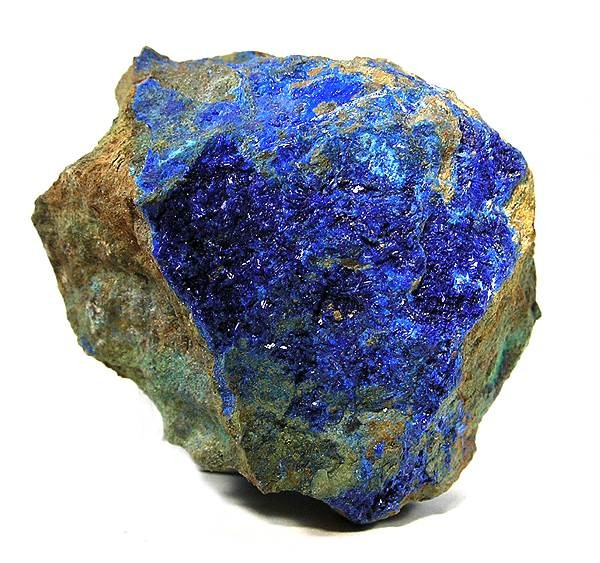
Linarite with caledonite, from Baker, El Dorado County, California US (Size 5.4 × 5.2 × 3.2 cm)

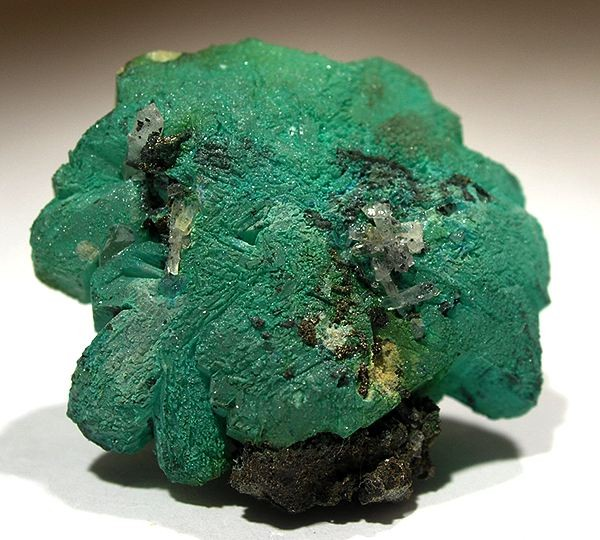
Unusual cerussite with a coating ingrained into the surface of microcrystalline malachite and linarite that give it a rich blue-green color
