= Ktenasite =

Sulfate mineral

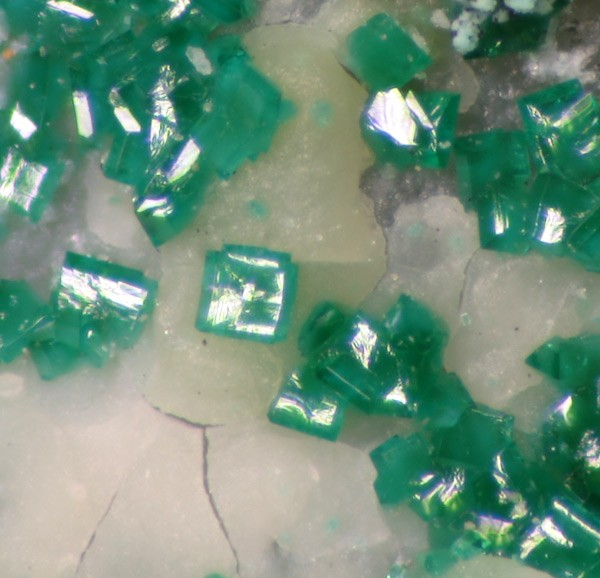
- Ktenasite. Locality: Maria Josefa Mine, Rodalquilar, Níjar, Almería, Andalusia, Spain. Picture width 1 mm. Collection and photograph Christian Rewitzer

General
- Category: Mineral sulphate
- Formula: ZnCu_{4}(SO_{4})_{2}(OH)_{6}·6H_{2}O
- IMA symbol: Kte
- Strunz classification: 7.DD.20
- Dana classification: 31.6.3.1
- Crystal system: monoclinic
- Crystal class: 2/m-Prismatic

Identification
- Color: blue-green to emerald green
- Mohs scale hardness: 2 to 2.5
- Luster: vitreous
- Density: 2.94 to 2.97 g/cm^{3}
- Refractive index: 1.57,1.61,1.62
- Birefringence: 0.049-0.054
- 2V angle: 51^{o} to 59^{o}

Ktenasite is a rare hydrous zinc copper sulphate mineral, with the formula ZnCu_{4}(SO_{4})_{2}(OH)_{6}·6H_{2}O. It is isostructural with fehrite, which has magnesium in place of zinc, and gobelinite, which has cobalt in place of zinc.

Ktenasite was named for Greek geologist and mineralogist Konstantinos Ktenas by his colleague, P. Kokkoros, who first described the mineral in 1950. Ktenasite was initially found in the Lavrion mining district, near Athens, Greece and is now known from multiple localities where it often forms by secondary alteration of pre-existing sulphide minerals such as chalcopyrite and sphalerite.
