= Brochantite =

Copper sulfate mineral

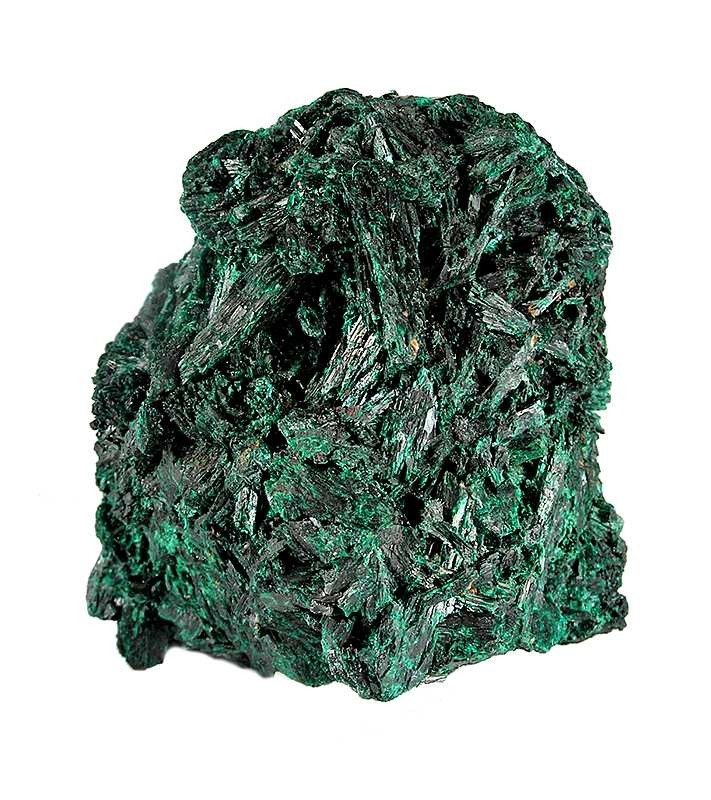

General
- Category: Sulfate minerals
- Formula: Cu_{4}SO_{4}(OH)_{6}
- IMA symbol: Bct
- Strunz classification: 7.BB.25
- Crystal system: Monoclinic
- Crystal class: Prismatic (2/m) (same H-M symbol)
- Space group: P2_{1}/a

Identification
- Color: Green, emerald green, or black
- Crystal habit: Prismatic crystals; acicular needle-like crystals; druse
- Cleavage: Perfect [100]
- Fracture: Conchoidal
- Tenacity: brittle
- Mohs scale hardness: 3.5–4.0
- Luster: Vitreous to pearly
- Streak: Pale green
- Diaphaneity: Transparent to translucent
- Specific gravity: 3.97
- Optical properties: Biaxial (−)
- Refractive index: nα = 1.728 nβ = 1.771 nγ = 1.800
- Birefringence: δ = 0.072
- Pleochroism: Weak
- 2V angle: measured: 72°

Brochantite is a sulfate mineral, one of a number of cupric sulfates. Its chemical formula is Cu_{4}SO_{4}(OH)_{6}. Formed in arid climates or in rapidly oxidizing copper sulfide deposits, it was named by Armand Lévy for his fellow Frenchman, geologist and mineralogist A. J. M. Brochant de Villiers.

Crystals of brochantite can range from emerald green to black-green to blue-green, and can be acicular or prismatic. Brochantite is often associated with minerals such as malachite, azurite, and chrysocolla, and may form pseudomorphs with these minerals.

The mineral is found in a number of locations around the world, notably the southwestern United States (especially Arizona), Serifos in Greece and Chile.

Brochantite is a common corrosion product on bronze sculptures located in urban areas, where atmospheric sulfur dioxide (a common pollutant) is present. Brochantite forms mainly in exposed areas where weathering prevents accumulation copper ions and enhancement in the acidity of water films. In sheltered areas, the main corrosion product is antlerite.

Brochantite veins were mined for copper in Chuquicamata, Chile, from 1879 until 1912 when a more indiscriminate large-scale mining of low-grade ores began at the mine.

== Gallery ==
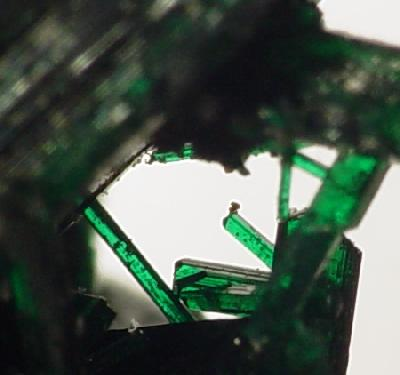
These long slender crystals, from Bisbee, Arizona, have the highly desirable emerald green color and good luster that is sought after in brochantite by collectors. Detail of thumbnail specimen, size 2.3 × 2 × .8 cm.

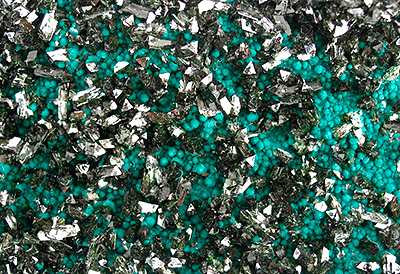
Brochantite on chrysocolla. Locality: Rokana Mine, Kitwe, Copperbelt Province, Zambia. Detail of larger specimen, field of view about 3 × 5 cm.

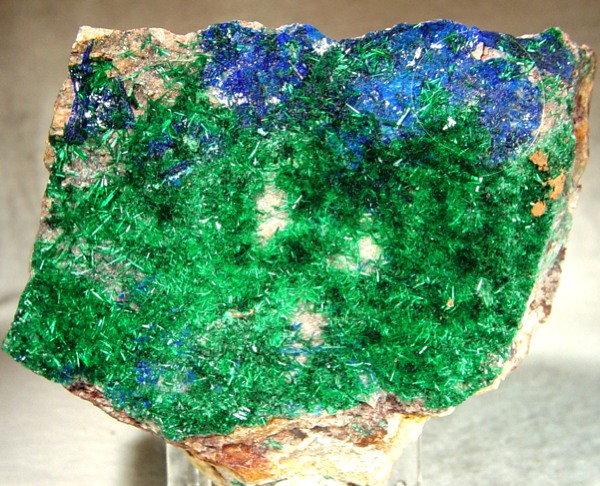
Brochantite on linarite. Locality: Mujuram, Morocco. Size 8 × 8 cm.
