= Prophet (disambiguation) =

A prophet is a person who is believed to speak through divine inspiration.

Prophet or The Prophet may also refer to:

== People referred to as "The Prophet" as a title ==
=== Religious figures ===
- Muhammad (570s–632), also known as Al-Nabi (The Prophet), regarded by Muslims as the last prophet of God
- Zoroaster (or Zarathushtra), founder of Zoroastrianism, sometimes referred to simply as "The Prophet"

=== Native American figures ===
- Francis the Prophet (c.1770–1818), a leader of the Red Stick faction of Creek Native Americans
- Tenskwatawa (1775–1836), Shawnee leader called "The Prophet" or "The Shawnee Prophet"
- Wabokieshiek (ca. 1794 – ca. 1841), Ho-Chunk leader called "The Prophet" or "The Winnebago Prophet"

=== Musicians ===
- Black Prophet (born Kenneth Wilberforce Zonto Bossman, 1977), Ghanaian reggae music composer and a member of the Rastafari movement
- Capleton (born 1967), known as "The Prophet", Jamaican reggae and dancehall artist
- Dov Elkabas (born 1968), Dutch musician and producer known as "DJ The Prophet"

== Given name ==
- Prophet Benjamin (born 1978), Trinidadian reggae singer
- Prophet Omega (1927–1992), American radio evangelist broadcasting

== Surname ==
- Chuck Prophet (born 1963), American musician
- David Prophet (1937–1981), English Formula One driver of the mid-1960s
- Elizabeth Clare Prophet (1939–2009), American leader of the New Age new religious movement The Summit Lighthouse
- John Prophet (1356–1416), English Secretary to King Henry IV, Keeper of the Privy Seal, and Dean of Hereford and York
- Mark L. Prophet (1918–1973), American New Age religious figure
- Melissa Prophet (born 1962), American actor
- Michael Prophet (1957–2017), English reggae singer
- Nancy Elizabeth Prophet (1890–1960), American sculptor
- Orval Prophet (1922–1984), Canadian country music performer

== Arts, entertainment, and media ==
=== Fictional characters ===
- Prophet (comics), an Image Comics character who first appeared in 1992
- Prophet (Star Trek), an alien race in the T.V. show Star Trek: Deep Space Nine
- Laurence "Prophet" Barnes, the leader of Raptor Team in the 2007 video game series Crysis
- Prophets or San'Shyuum, royal rulers of the Covenant in the video games series Halo

=== Films ===
- The Prophet, or Il profeta (1968), an Italian comedy directed by Dino Risi
- A Prophet (2009), a French drama directed by Jacques Audiard
- The Prophet (2014 film), an animated film adapted from Kahlil Gibran's book The Prophet

=== Literature ===
- Prophet (novel), 1992 Christian novel by Frank E. Peretti
- Al-Anbiya, “The Prophets”, the 21st chapter of the Qur'an
- Nevi'im, "Prophets", the second main division of the Hebrew Bible
- The Prophet (book), 1923 collection of poetry by Kahlil Gibran
- The Prophet (newspaper), a New York City periodical published 1844–1845
- The Prophetess (play), 1647 Jacobean era tragicomedy by John Fletcher and Philip Massinger
- The Prophets, a 1962 study of the Hebrew prophets by Abraham Joshua Heschel
- The Prophet: The Life of Leon Trotsky, a biography by Isaac Deutscher

=== Music ===
==== Bands ====
- Prophet (band), an American melodic rock band
- Lostprophets, Welsh alternative metal/rock band

==== Albums ====
- The Prophet (album), 1972 album by American jazz organist Johnny Hammond
- Prophet (Oliver Lake album), 1980 album by American jazz saxophonist Oliver Lake
- Prophet (Prophet album), 1985 album by Prophet
- Prophet (Jerusalem album), 1994 album by Swedish hard rock band Jerusalem
- Prophets (album), 2010 album by Canadian metalcore band Counterparts
- Prophet (Ramona Falls album), 2012 album by Ramona Falls
- The Prophets (album), a 1990 album by Alpha Blondy

==== Other uses in music ====
- "Prophet (Better Watch It)", 2011 song by British hip hop duo Rizzle Kicks from the album, Stereo Typical
- "Prophet", a 2019 song by King Princess from the album Cheap Queen
- "The Prophet", a 1973 song by Buffalo from the album Volcanic Rock
- "The Prophet", a 2001 song by Emperor from the album Prometheus: The Discipline of Fire & Demise
- "The Prophet", a 2001 song by Gary Moore from the album Back to the Blues
- Le prophète (or The Prophet), 1849 opera by Giacomo Meyerbeer
- Prophet, a line of synthesizers manufactured by Sequential
- Dioclesian or The Prophetess, 1690 semi-opera by Henry Purcell
- Prophet Entertainment, or Prophet Posse, an American record label

=== Other uses in arts, entertainment, and media ===
- The Prophet (4/7), a 1933 sculpture by Spanish artist Pablo Gargallo
- The Prophet (telenovela), a 2006–2007 Brazilian soap opera

== Other uses ==
- Prophet (company), an American consulting firm and agency

== See also ==
- Profit (disambiguation)
- Prophecy (disambiguation)
- Propheteer (disambiguation)
