= Prophecy (disambiguation) =

Prophecy is a prediction or the disclosure of information that is not known to the prophet by any ordinary means.

Prophecy may also refer to:

== Gaming ==
- Prophecy (Magic: The Gathering), an expansion to the Magic: The Gathering collectible card game
- Tomb Raider: The Prophecy, a 2002 Tomb Raider game for the Game Boy Advance by Ubi Soft
- Wing Commander: Prophecy, the fourth direct sequel in Chris Roberts' Wing Commander science fiction flight simulator franchise
- Guild Wars Prophecies, the first game in the Guild Wars series
- Prophecy: The Fall of Trinadon, a 1989 game by Activision
- "Prophecy", the fourth chapter of Deltarune.
- In the Yu-Gi-Oh! Trading Card Game, there's an archetype of monsters named "Prophecy".

== Music ==
- Korg Prophecy, analogue modelling synthesiser made by Korg

=== Albums ===
- Prophecy (Capleton album), 1995
- Prophecy (Fred Hopkins and Diedre Murray album), 1998
- Prophecy (Soulfly album), 2004
- Prophecy (Susan McKeown album), 2002

=== Songs ===
- "Prophecy" (Mami Kawada song), 2009
- "Prophecy" (Remy Zero song), 1998
- "Prophecy" (Soulfly song), a song by Soulfly from the album Prophecy, 2004
- "Prophecy", a tune by Diedre Murray from Prophecy (Fred Hopkins and Diedre Murray album), 1998
- "Prophecy", a song by The Browning from End of Existence
- "Prophecy", a song by Front Line Assembly from Implode
- "Prophecy", a song by Iced Earth from Something Wicked This Way Comes
- "Prophecy", a song by Mike Oldfield from Music of the Spheres
- "Prophecy", a song by Judas Priest from Nostradamus
- "Prophecy", a song by Queensrÿche from Queensrÿche (EP)
- "Prophecy", a song by Zion I from Starship EP
- "A Prophecy", a song by Asking Alexandria from Stand Up and Scream

== Television ==
- Dune: Prophecy (TV series), a 2020s TV show on HBO Max, formerly Dune: Sisterhood, based on Denis Villeneuve's film series based on Frank Herbert's novel series; this show derived from the novel Sisterhood of Dune by Brian Herbert

=== Episodes ===
- "Prophecy" (Legend of the Seeker)
- "Prophecy" (Star Trek: Voyager)
- "Prophecy" (Stargate SG-1)

== Other media ==
- Prophecy (film), a 1979 ecological horror film starring Robert Foxworth and Talia Shire
- Prophecy (manga), a manga series by Tetsuya Tsutsui
- Prophecy (Harry Potter), a prediction made by Sybill Trelawney in the Harry Potter series by J. K. Rowling

== See also ==
- The Prophecy (disambiguation)
- Prophet (disambiguation)
- Prophesying (preaching service)
- Fortune teller
- Psychic
- Astrology
- The Chosen One (disambiguation)
