= Proffit =

Proffit may refer to

== People ==
- George H. Proffit (1807–1847), American lawyer, diplomat, and politician in Indiana
- Jared Proffit (born 1993), New Zealand rugby union player
- Joseph E. Proffit (1876–1958), American politician from Virginia
- William Proffit (1936–2018), American orthodontist

== Places ==
- Proffit, Virginia, an unincorporated community in Albemarle County in the U.S. state of Virginia
  - Proffit Historic District, a national historic district located there
- Proffit Mountain, a mountain located in Reynolds County in the U.S. state of Missouri

== Other uses ==
- Mason Proffit, an American country rock band active 1969–1973

== See also ==
- Proffitt (disambiguation)
- Profit (disambiguation)
