= The Prophet (4/7) =

Public artwork by Pablo Gargallo

The Prophet (St. John the Baptist)
- El prophète (Spanish)
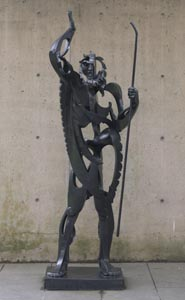
- Artist: Pablo Gargallo
- Year: 1933
- Type: bronze, edition (4/7)
- Dimensions: 233 cm × 74.9 cm × 48.3 cm (91 3/4 in × 29 1/2 in × 19 in)
- Location: The Baltimore Museum of Art; Baltimore, Maryland; 39°16′26″N 76°36′5″W
- Owner: The Alan and Janet Wurtzburger Collection

The Prophet (4/7) is a public artwork by Spanish artist Pablo Gargallo, located in the Alan and Janet Wurtzburger Sculpture Garden at The Baltimore Museum of Art, which is in Baltimore, Maryland, United States. This bronze sculpture was created in 1933, using the sand casting method, and depicts an abstract male figure with his right arm bent towards the sky and holding a staff in his left hand.

== Description ==
This sculpture represents a male figure, thought to be John the Baptist, in the Cubist tradition. The figure is positioned in a powerful stance with his right arm raised and mouth open, as if he is delivering a message or a sermon, and he carries a staff in the proper left hand. The Prophet is made of metal planes, structured around a central axis formed by the head, spine and legs. The feet of the figure are flatly planted on the rectangular base. The artist's signature is inscribed on the top of the base, in between the figure's feet, and reads, "P. Gargallo 4/7." On the rear vertical panel of the base is inscribed, "Georges Rudier/Foundeur Paris."

=== Editions ===
Gargallo created seven casts of The Prophet and three artist's proofs. They are currently at the following locations.

The Prophet (1/7) – The Musée National d'Art Moderne in Paris, France

The Prophet (2/7) – Bilbao Fine Arts Museum, Spain

The Prophet (3/7) – The Middelheim Open Air Sculpture Museum in Antwerp, Belgium

The Prophet (4/7) – The Baltimore Museum of Art in Maryland

The Prophet (5/7) – The Hirshhorn Museum and Sculpture Garden in Washington, D.C.

The Prophet (6/7) – Fundação Calouste Gulbenkian in Lisbon, Portugal

The Prophet (7/7) – The Museo Nacional Centro de Arte Reina Sofia in Madrid, Spain

Proofs

The Prophet (AP1/3) – The Museo Pablo Gargallo in Zaragoza, Spain

The Prophet (AP2/3) – The Museum of Contemporary Art in Caracas Sofía Imber, Venezuela

The Prophet (AP3/3) – The Hakone Open-Air Museum in Japan

== Historical information ==
According to the BMA records and the foundry mark on the sculpture, The Prophet was cast at the Georges Rudier Foundry in Paris, France. The BMA's version is the fourth of seven casts.

=== Location history ===
Between 1955 and 1973, Alan and Janet Wurtzburger purchased examples of modern sculpture with the intention of donating to the BMA. Until the opening of The Alan and Janet Wurtzburger Sculpture Garden in 1980, the purchased sculptures were installed at Timberlane, their estate in Stevenson, Maryland. The Prophet has been on view in the sculpture garden since its installation in 1980.

=== Acquisition ===
The sculpture was accessioned by the BMA in 1966 as a gift from the Wurtzburgers, along with thirty-five other works of art. However, it was not moved to the museum until the opening of the sculpture garden in 1980.

== Condition ==
The sculpture is monitored, cleaned, and treated regularly by the BMA art conservation staff. Each summer, the sculpture undergoes maintenance which includes washing, the removal of the previously applied protective wax coating, and the application of a fresh coat of hard wax.

In 1987, the figure's staff was slightly bent just below the hand. Again, in 1990, the staff was bent, resulting in a severe S-shaped curve just below the figure's hand when coupled with the vandalism from 1987. Conservators removed and repaired the staff, and it was re-installed in the fall of 1990.

== See also ==
- Conservation and restoration of outdoor artworks
- Conservation and restoration of outdoor bronze objects
- Sculpture
- Sculpture garden
- Save Outdoor Sculpture!
