= Gregory Slay =

American drummer

- Born: May 10, 1969; New Orleans, Louisiana, United States
- Died: January 1, 2010 (aged 40) Bodega Bay, California, U.S.
- Genres: Alternative rock, indie rock
- Occupation: Drummer
- Instrument: Drums

Gregory Scott Slay (May 10, 1969 – January 1, 2010) was an American musician, drummer and songwriter. Slay was a founding member of Remy Zero and remained the band's drummer until its breakup in 2003.

== Biography ==
=== Early life ===
Slay was born in New Orleans, Louisiana, on May 10, 1969, to parents, Dudley and Jenny Slay. However, he was raised in Mobile, Alabama. Slay was diagnosed with cystic fibrosis during childhood.

Slay attended both Davidson High School and McGill-Toolen Catholic High School in Mobile. He began collaborating with Jeffrey Cain, another future member of Remy Zero, while in high school.

=== Xcel/Last Great Circus ===
While in High School in 1984, Slay formed Xcel, a hard rock band, with friends from Mobile. The band practiced in his parents' studio and played cover tunes as well as some originals at schools and functions. After various members left the group, the band reformed as the Last Great Circus and eventually won a local Mobile, AL Battle of the Bands.

=== Loppybogymi ===
In 1988, Slay co-founded the trio Loppybogymi with bassist, James Orr, and guitarist, Tim Ramenofsky. The band's sound was an amalgamation of jazz-inspired funk and metal. Initially based in Mobile, Alabama, the band performed live in venues along the Gulf Coast and throughout the southeastern United States, settling for a while in Nashville, Tennessee. Loppybogymi developed a cult following along the Gulf Coast. The band's performances were notable for the virtuosity of each member of the group, high energy, and lengthy improvisational excursions. Each member of the trio sang, and Slay sang prominently on a number of songs, including crowd favorites such as "Hyperblood", "Debts and Grudges" and "Love of Pete." Slay left Loppybogymi about a year after the band's release of the album, TUP, in 1993.

=== Remy Zero ===
Slay joined Remy Zero in Birmingham, Alabama with high school friend, Jeffrey Cain, who was also from Mobile, and Cedric LeMoyne, Cinjun Tate and Shelby Tate (Remy Zero), who were all natives of Birmingham. The band left Birmingham in 1990, and relocated to several cities before settling in Los Angeles. Slay returned to Birmingham with his band in 1996, where they recorded their self-titled debut album, Remy Zero. The band later became a commercial success with their 1998 album, Villa Elaine.

Remy Zero became best known to television audiences for "Save Me", the theme song to Smallville. However, Remy Zero disbanded in 2003 after three albums.

=== Later career ===
Following the breakup of Remy Zero, Slay turned his attention to other projects. He formed another band called Sleepwell. He also collaborated in other projects with singer-songwriter Eliot Morris. Slay became the drummer for O+S, a collaborative effort between Orenda Fink and Cedric LeMoyne, another former member of Remy Zero.

In 2003, Slay joined with former Remy Zero bandmates Jeffrey Cain and Cedric LeMoyne, to record, "A Perfect Lie", the theme song for the television drama, Nip/Tuck, under the name Engine Room. "A Perfect Lie", which Slay co-wrote, earned an Emmy nomination for outstanding main title theme music in 2004.

In 2004 he joined a project band called Isidore formed by Jeffrey Cain from Remy Zero and Steve Kilbey from The Church. He played drums on the 2004 debut album "Isidore".

=== Death ===
Slay, who had been touring and recording in the studio in the weeks preceding his death, unexpectedly fell into ill health. Slay died on January 1, 2010, of cystic fibrosis in Bodega Bay, California, at the age of 40. He was survived by his parents, his wife, Tiana Krahn-Slay, and daughter, Honeymoon Slay.

A public memorial service following cremation was held for Slay in May 2010.

== Discography ==
=== With Loppybogymi ===
- Tup (1993)

=== With Remy Zero ===
- Remy Zero (1996)
- Villa Elaine (1998)
- The Golden Hum (2002)

=== As Sleepwell ===
- Sleepwell (2003)
- Kitchen Street (2007)
- Spiders/Rain (2007)

=== With Isidore ===
- Isidore (2004)

=== As Horsethief Beats ===
- The Sound Will Find You (Posthumously released in 2010 under the name Gregory Scott Slay)
