= Villa Elaine =

Studio album by Remy Zero
- Released: August 25, 1998
- Genre: Alternative rock, grunge, indie folk
- Length: 55:21
- Label: Geffen
- Producer: David Bottrill, Remy Zero

Remy Zero chronology
Remy Zero (1996)	Villa Elaine (1998)	Live on Morning Becomes Eclectic (1998)

Professional ratings
Review scores
Source	Rating
AllMusic	1.5/5 stars
Q	4/5 stars
Sputnikmusic	5/5 stars

Villa Elaine is Remy Zero's second studio album, released in 1998 and produced for Geffen Records. After recording the album, Radiohead, who the band had toured with previously, added Remy Zero to their tour in support of OK Computer. The band also toured with Scottish band Travis. The album became popular for the song "Prophecy", which was used on the soundtrack for the films She's All That in 1998 and The Last Kiss in 2006. The song "Fair" was used on Zach Braff's Grammy Award-winning soundtrack to the 2004 film Garden State and, more recently, featured in the 2009 film Fanboys. "Hermes Bird" was used in the TV series Felicity and Charmed. "Problem" appeared on the soundtrack for the 1998 Drew Barrymore film Never Been Kissed.

== Track listing ==
1. "Hermes Bird" – 3:56
2. "Prophecy" – 3:24
3. "Life in Rain" – 3:36
4. "Hollow" – 6:21
5. "Problem" – 3:29
6. "Whither Vulcan" – 4:13
7. "Gramarye" – 5:16
8. "Yellow Light" – 4:03
9. "Motorcycle" – 3:38
10. "Fair" – 3:56
11. "Goodbye Little World" – 13:29
- There is a bonus track beginning around 11:15 through the final song "Goodbye Little World", called "Instrumental 523".

== Credits ==
- Artwork By [Art Direction And Design] – Bill Merryfield, Remy Zero
- Assorted Keyboards – Benmont Tench, David Bottrill, Patrick Warren
- Mastered By – Stephen Marcussen
- Mixed By – Alan Moulder
- A & R – Tony Berg
- Legal – Lenard & Gonzalez
- Managed By – Richard Brown
- Performer – Cedric LeMoyne, Cinjun Tate, Gregory Slay, Jeffrey Cain, Shelby Tate
- Photography – Corinne Day
- Additional Photography – Jeffery Cain, Shelby Tate
- Producer – David Bottrill, Remy Zero
- Technician [Studio Assistant] – Casey McMackin, Dave Reed, Greg Fidelman, Mike Bumgartner, Todd Burke
- Mixed at RAK Studios, London (except tracks 3, 6, and 11 mixed at A&M Studios, Los Angeles)
- Audio liberally amassed and stored at the following studios in Los Angeles: Sound City, Grandmaster, The Hook, Studio 9 and Zeitgeist.
- Mastered at Precision Mastering, Los Angeles, CA
