= Paintings conservator =

Individual responsible for protecting paintings

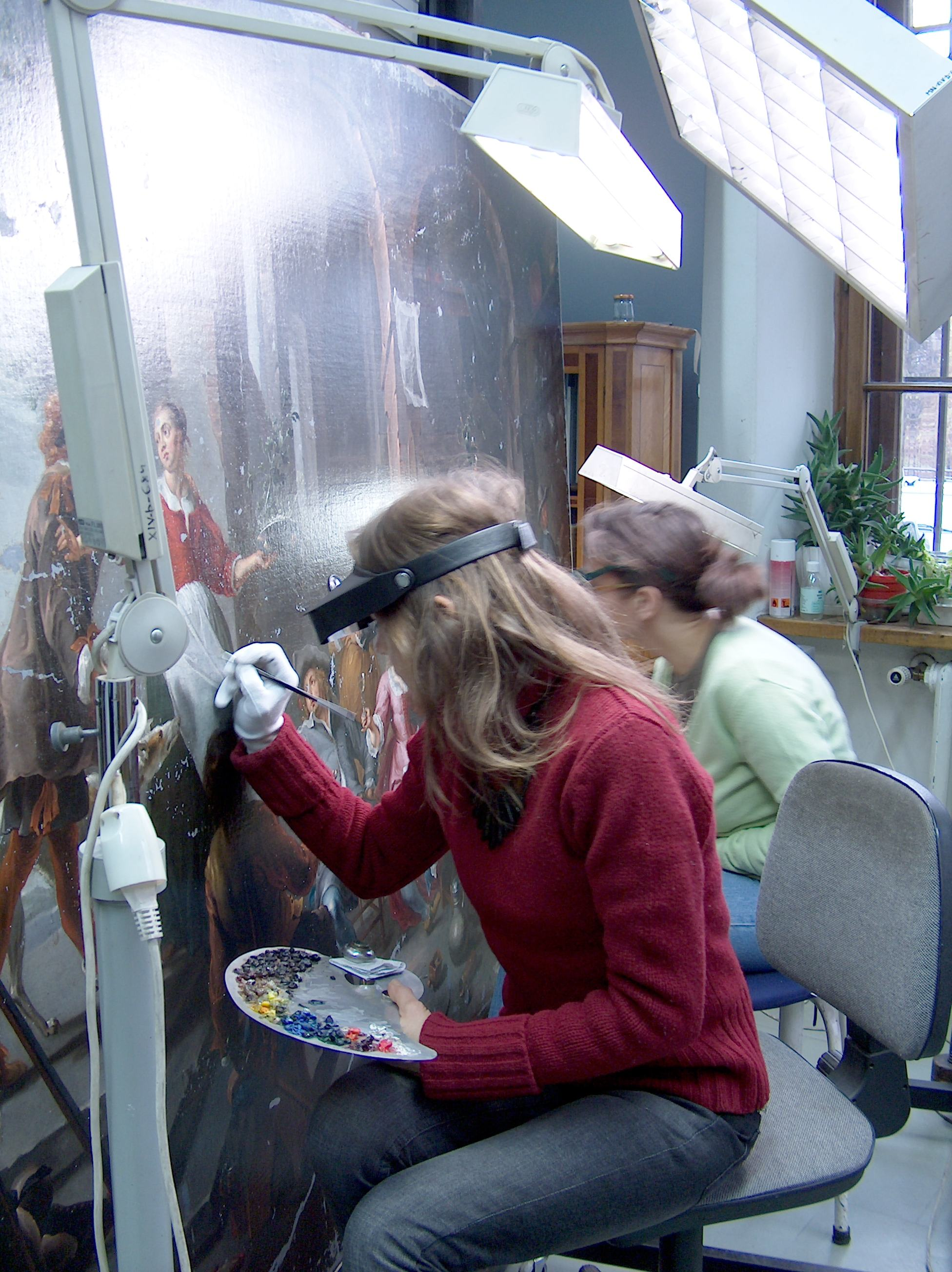
Paintings conservators treating a painting at the National Museum, Warsaw.

A paintings conservator is an individual responsible for protecting cultural heritage in the form of painted works of art. These individuals are most often under the employ of museums, conservation centers, or other cultural institutions. They oversee the physical care of collections, and are trained in chemistry and practical application of techniques for repairing and restoring paintings.

== Responsibilities and duties ==
=== Collaboration ===
A paintings conservator works with a number of museum professionals to ensure painted works of art receive the best quality of care. This individual may be called upon by a Registrar/Collections Manager (RCM) in the event of an emergency, such as accidental damage. A paintings conservator may also be called upon to consult with the RCM and an exhibition design team to ensure a work is stable enough for display, and determine how much exposure to environmental factors, such as humidity or light, it can withstand.

=== Preventive care ===
Preventive care is the abating of potential deterioration and damage to a painting through previously designated policies and procedures surrounding the object's storage and handling.

==== Emergency preparedness ====
Emergency preparedness and an emergency plan are crucial pieces to have in place for a museum. It informs conservators, RCMs, and all other museum personnel how to respond to disasters that may strike their institution, and therefore its collections. These plans can be expansive, detailing a number of procedures for different contingencies, such as fire, flooding, and even war. Protective measures in an emergency plan should include prevention through risk management, preparedness and response training, and recovery arrangements. An institution should know which staff member's are delegated to a project during a given circumstance, and be able to tell them how they will assess and move forward with the help of an emergency plan.

==== Integrated pest management (IPM) ====
Integrated pest management (IPM) is the strategy used by a museum to handle pests such as mold, insects, or mice. An IPM program may address structural and environmental issues that contribute to the pest problem. This could include preventing initial entry of pests into the structure through building maintenance, moderating the interior climate, and setting up an insect monitoring system. Like an emergency plan, IPM can be time-consuming and require a number of responsibilities from each staff member. However, if pests do become an issue for a single painting or the entire museum, an IPM system will be helpful to have in place. Prevention is a key part of IPM, as chemical pesticides and fumigants can also be harmful to collections.

==== Storage, handling, and loan travel ====
Inter-museum loans can put paintings at great risk, simply due to the fact that they are being moved. The amount of stress a painting can withstand is determined by a number of pre-existing factors, such as canvas and painting technique. Prior to the loan, a paintings conservator will assess the structure of the work for weaknesses and potential areas at risk. This helps determine if a piece is suitable for a loan and how it will be packed and transported. Preparation for a loaned painting generally involves padding the work's frame and ensuring it is properly mounted, determination as to whether it will need a backing board, and what repairs the frame may need prior to transport. The paintings conservator may also be called upon to collaborate with other personnel from the loaning museum to assess the environment of the institution that is borrowing the work. He or she may also take into consideration the travel route between the loaning and the borrowing institutions. The transit planner must consider environmental conditions on the route, how often the work will need to be handled, and security.

=== Examination ===
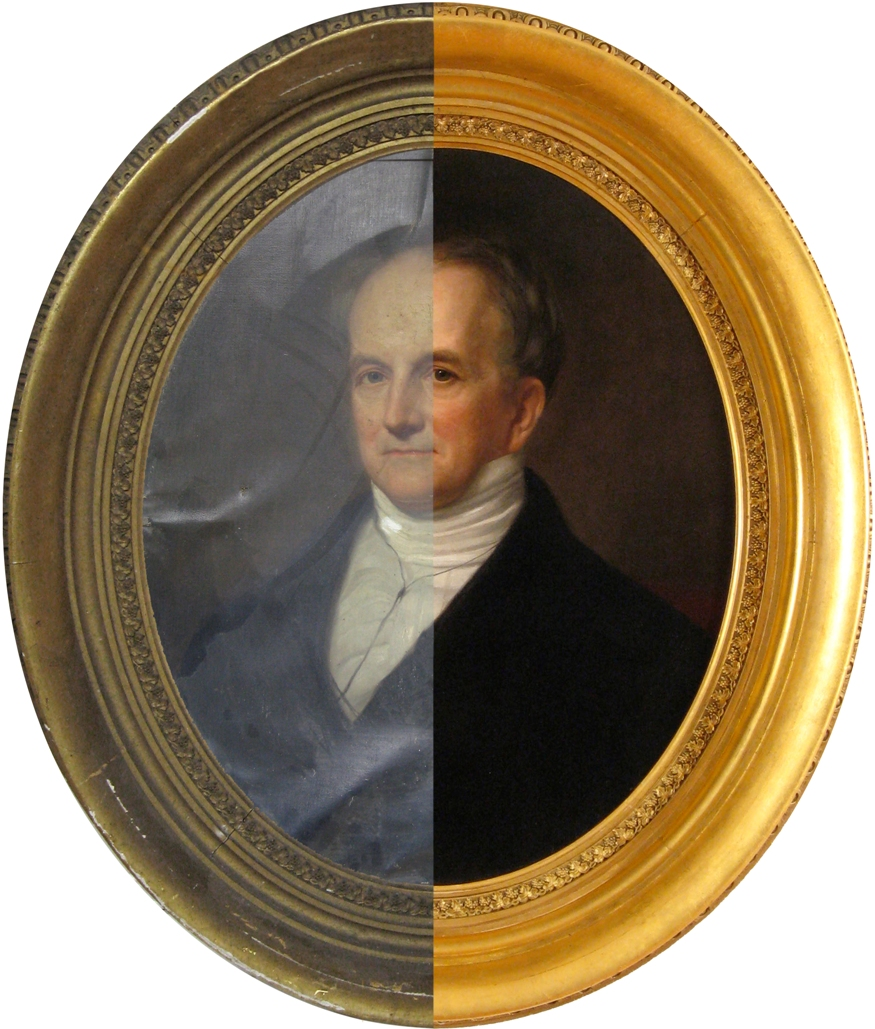
Art Restoration, Painting and Frame Restoration, before and after, Oliver Brothers Art Restoration, Boston

Examination is a series of scientific processes by which a paintings conservator collects information regarding the materials used, the technique of the painter, and what has contributed to the painting's current state. Examination is a process that has evolved with the field of conservation. Taking samples of materials in a painting has decreased in favor of less invasive techniques for analysis. Examination has become a crucial part of the museum, conservation, and art historical worlds, helping to place paintings within a cultural and historical context.

=== Restoration ===
A painting's natural aging process, as well as environmental factors, can require intervention by a paintings conservator to restore the work. Reasons for restoration may include water damage, tearing, flaking, and a weakened canvas. The primary goal of a paintings conservator conducting a restoration is to ensure the work is stable. From there, they may integrate repairs that preserve the artist's original intent.

== Instrumentation and uses ==
=== Imaging methods ===
Ultraviolet light

Ultraviolet light examinations are used to reveal varnishes and their ages, as well as previous treatments to a painting. Varnishes fluoresce under UV light and dark spots reveal areas of retouching. Brightness of the painting's glow also helps to reveal the type of varnish used.

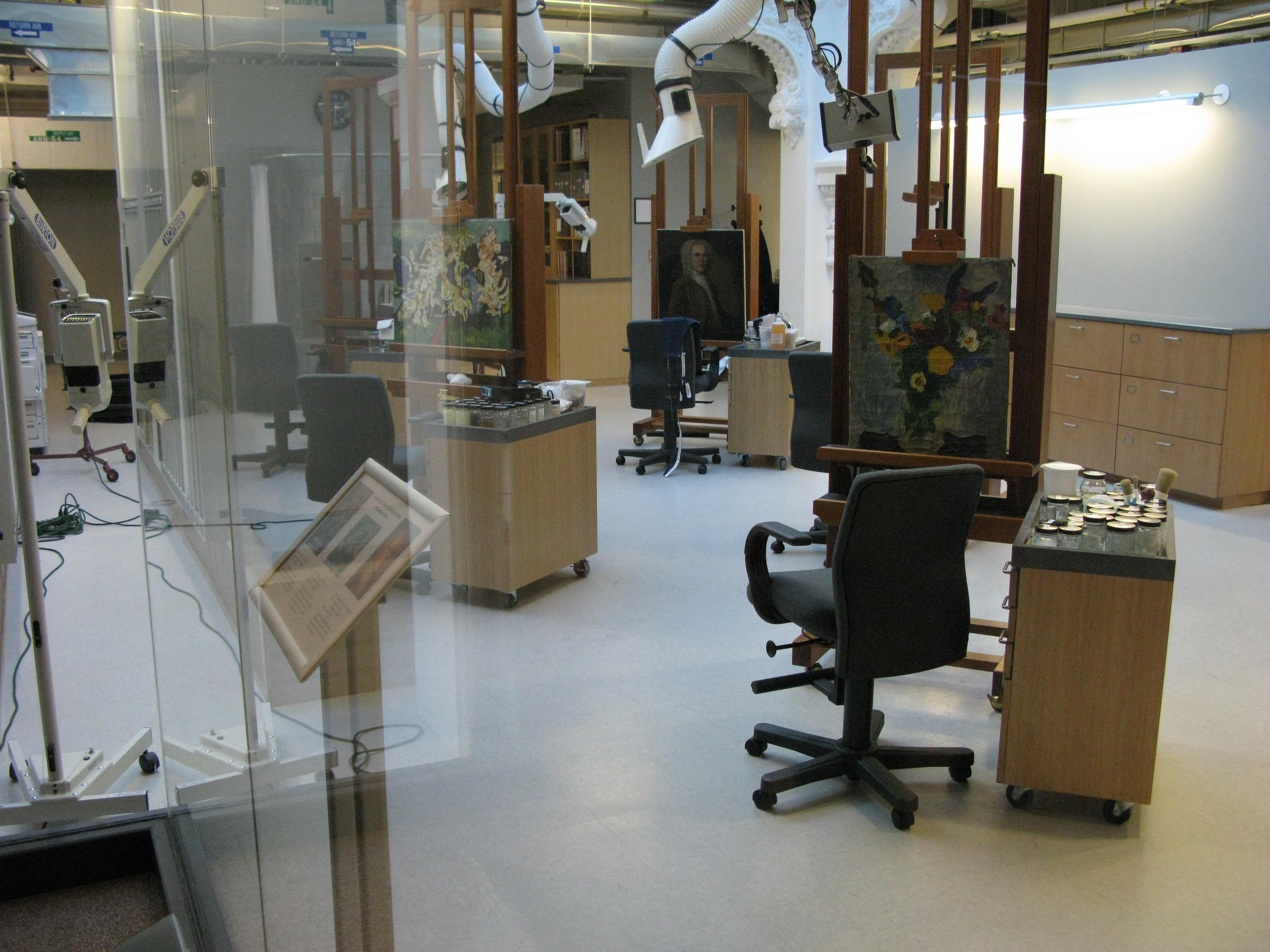
The paintings conservation laboratory at the Lunder Conservation Center

Raking Light

Raking light is an oblique-angled light that can record condition problems of a painting, showing the extent of the damage to a particular work. Raking light also aids in identifying the topography of brush strokes in paintings, sometimes revealing the underlying original intent of an artist.

Infrared light

The use of infrared lighting can reveal the working methods of an artist, such as initial sketches and perspective lines drawn on a canvas. This method is effective on works that have a contrasting pale ground.

X-radiography

X-radiographs of a painting allow conservators to see beneath the work's surface. The use of this method also helps distinguish between materials that look similar under visible light, but have different x-ray absorption. For example, the Victoria and Albert Museum used x-radiography on a painting by Jean-François Millet entitled The Wood Sawyers. The image below showed a woman representing the French Republic, a submission to a competition that Millet would lose. Without the means to pay for a new canvas, Millet painted over the existing image.

=== Lasers ===
The use of lasers allows for control and accuracy in the removal of aged or deteriorated layers on painted works, as well as identifying materials and layers within a painting. In 2012, Duke University scientists developed a laser for melanoma diagnoses. Through work with the National Gallery and the North Carolina Museum of Art, the scientists have determined that this laser can also be used to identify the chemical signatures of pigments and three-dimensional structures in layers of artwork. Another Duke University chemist also invented a useful laser for painting conservators that removes layers of old varnish.

=== Varnishes ===
Varnishes are applied to paintings to enhance the appearance of the image, as well as to protect it over time. When dry, varnishes are typically transparent and can vary in gloss and durability as its composition changes. Varnishes may be organic or synthetic. Since natural varnishes tend to darken or discolor over time, attention from a paintings conservator is often necessary to remove, replace, or restore it. It is again important to remember the artist's original intent when choosing a new varnish. Varnishes often offer a desired effect, and a synthetic variety may not offer what an originally natural resin provided.

== Education and training ==
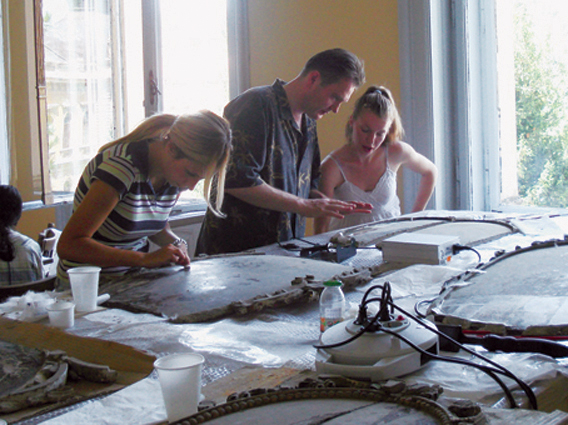
Paintings conservators at work

A paintings conservator will likely have acquired a master's degree, or higher. There are several graduate programs throughout the United States, and the world, for arts conservation and restoration training. The education and training of a conservator will vary depending on the institution he or she is employed by, but paintings conservators will have knowledge of chemistry and the physical sciences as related to the deterioration and protection of cultural heritage in painted works. Practical application of training may be applied in the form of internships or fellowships, depending on the level of education an individual has received.

== Controversies ==
Conservation and the practice of restoration are controversial themselves, as they involve permanent changes made to an artist's work. This is why it is important for a paintings conservator to examine a work closely before making restorative changes. In doing so, they can often identify original varnishes and layers that contributed to the artist's intent for the appearance of the work. However, even close examination and careful restoration does not protect a paintings conservator or a work from being the center of controversy.

=== Sistine Chapel restoration ===
Restoration of the Sistine Chapel in the Vatican has been ongoing during the latter part of the twentieth century. Much of the criticism and controversy surrounding the restoration is that previous attempts to restore the frescoes have done more damage than good. Critics of modern restoration have suggested a more conservative approach to prevent further deterioration, rather than contribute to its problems through restorative measures.

=== The Last Supper ===
Restoration on Leonardo da Vinci's Last Supper finished in 1999 after two decades of work. Many believe the work done was clumsy, with some features being unrecognizably bright while others went missing altogether.

=== Santuario de la Misericordia Fresco ===
In 2012, Cecilia Giménez, an elderly woman without conservation training, attempted to restore an Ecce Homo fresco in a Spanish church. The fresco had been flaking due to moisture on the walls, and this reportedly upset the woman. Her resulting restorative work left the portrait with what many have described as looking monkeyish, with cartoonish eyes and a smudged mouth. The restoration attempt came to light after a family member of the original artist proposed a fund for conservation work.

== See also ==
- Collection (museum)
- Conservator-restorer
- Conservation science
- Collections care
- Conservation and restoration of outdoor artworks
- Conservation and restoration of outdoor murals
- Conservation and restoration of paintings
