= Save Me (Remy Zero song) =

2001 song by Remy Zero

Single by Remy Zero

from the album The Golden Hum
- Released: September 10, 2001
- Recorded: 2000
- Genre: Alternative rock
- Length: 3:59
- Label: Elektra
- Songwriters: Gregory Slay; Cinjun Tate; Shelby Tate; Jeffrey Cain; Cedric LeMoyne
- Producer: Jack Joseph Puig

Remy Zero singles chronology
"Gramarye" (1999)	"Save Me" (2001)	"Perfect Memory (I'll Remember You)" (2001)

Music video
- "Save Me" on YouTube

"Save Me" is a song by American alternative rock band Remy Zero, released as a single on September 10, 2001 via Elektra Records. Taken from their third and final studio album The Golden Hum, it reached number 27 on the United States Billboard Modern Rock charts, and became a moderate hit in several countries.

"Save Me" is best known as the theme song for the successful Superman-based television series Smallville (2001–2011). In a callback to Smallville, the song was later used on The Flash episode "Elseworlds, Part 1", which featured part of the original Smallville set.

The shorter version of this song is from the Smallville compilation CD: Smallville: The Talon Mix (2003). The Season 1 finale, titled "Tempest", features Remy Zero appearing at the Spring Formal and performing the theme version of "Save Me" and "Perfect Memory (I'll Remember You)".

== Music video ==
The music video for "Save Me", directed by Phil Harder, was filmed in Minneapolis, Minnesota and features clips of downtown Minneapolis, Minnesota State Fairgrounds and of the bridges along the Mississippi River, including the I-35W Mississippi River bridge, which collapsed in August 2007.

In the music video, Cinjun Tate is different from everyone else. Everyone around him walks in reverse and cars drive backwards. The band performs inside a giant room with background projections of unrelated images (a lizard for example). In the end, everyone who walked backwards stops. Tate looks around, later shrugs, and walks backwards the same as everyone else before the video fades to black.

== Track listing ==
=== CD and Maxi-single ===
1. "Save Me" (Radio Edit) - 4:01
2. "Save Me" (Album Version) - 4:23

=== Smallville single – Intro ===
1. "Save Me" – 0:51

== Personnel ==
=== Remy Zero ===
- Remy Zero: Songwriter and composer
- Cinjun Tate: Vocals
- Shelby Tate: Guitar, keyboards
- Cedric LeMoyne: Bass
- Gregory Slay: Drums
- Jeffrey Cain: Guitar

=== Additional Musicians ===
- Tim Pierce: Background vocals

=== Production ===
- Jack Joseph Puig: Mixing engineer and producer
- Jason Lader: Engineer

== Charts ==
Chart (2001–2003)	Peak position
France (SNEP)	16
New Zealand (Recorded Music NZ)	46
UK Singles (Official Charts)	55
US Adult Pop Airplay (Billboard)	33
US Alternative Airplay (Billboard)	27

== Notes ==
1. Besant, Janna: "A Super Soundtrack from 'Smallville'" The Buffalo News, April 30, 2003.
2. CNET Networks Entertainment: "Smallville: Tempest (1)", TV.com, May 21, 2002.
