= Temenos (disambiguation) =

Temenos may refer to:

- Temenos, a piece of land cut off and assigned as an official domain or a piece of land marked off from common uses and dedicated to a god
- Temenos of Samothrace, one of the principal Pan-Hellenic religious sanctuaries
- Temenus, a hero and descendant of Heracles in Greek mythology, spelt Temenos in Greek
- Temenos Academy, an educational charity in London
- Temenos Academy Review, a journal published in London by the Temenos Academy
- Temenos, Greece, a former municipality in the Heraklion regional unit of Crete
- Temenos AG, a financial software company
- "Temenos (Here Come the Shakes)", a song from Temy Zero (album)
- Temenos, a public sculpture in the Tees Valley Giants series in Middlesbrough, England
