= Live on Morning Becomes Eclectic =

EP by Remy Zero
- Released: 1998
- Genre: Alternative rock
- Length: 18:00

Remy Zero chronology
Villa Elaine (1998)	Live on Morning Becomes Eclectic (1998)	The Golden Hum (2001)

Live on Morning Becomes Eclectic is a 1998 promo EP by Remy Zero recorded live on KCRW for Morning Becomes Eclectic. The interview conducted by Nic Harcourt.

== Track listing ==
No.	Title	Length
1.	"Prophecy" (Album Version)	3:24
2.	"Interview" (With Nic Harcourt)	0:59
3.	"Hermes Bird" (Live On KCRW)	4:38
4.	"Interview" (With Nic Harcourt)	3:14
5.	"Life In Rain" (Live On KCRW)	3:59
6.	"Interview" (With Nic Harcourt)	4:38
7.	"Hollow" (Live On KCRW)	4:38

== Credits ==
- Artwork By – Mary Ann Dibbs
- A&R – Tony Berg
- Management – Richard Brown/Industry Entertainment
- Photography – Korinne Day
- Written By – Remy Zero
