= Rocket Languages (software) =

Rocket Languages Ltd is an online language learning company founded in 2004 by Jason Oxenham and Mark Ling.

== Language courses ==
Rocket Languages offers language courses covering a range of languages. Its courses are web-based, do not require additional software installation, and are compatible with Mac and PC.

Course access is provided through an online portal that requires a login and can be accessed from desktop computers or through iOS and Android applications. Members receive lifetime access to purchased materials, which can also be downloaded for offline use.

Courses include lessons covering speaking, writing, listening, reading, and cultural topics. Other learning tools include speech recognition technology, interactive tests, personalized word lists, flashcards, and motivational features.

Languages offered have included Spanish, Sign Language, Russian, Portuguese, Korean, Japanese, Italian, Hindi, German, French, English, Chinese, and Arabic, as well as versions of English intended for Spanish- and Japanese-speaking learners.

== History ==
When founded in 2005, Rocket Languages was self-funded and became profitable after 12 months, after which revenue was reinvested in the development of additional language courses.

Rocket Languages first developed Rocket Spanish, a Latin American Spanish course, followed by Rocket French, a French language course.

As of April 2019, Rocket Languages reported offering courses in 15 languages.

== Reception ==
In 2009, Rocket Languages had more than 70,000 customers, of whom more than half were American learners over 35 years of age. The company's courses were sold internationally in more than 90 countries, with the United States, Britain, and Canada representing major markets.

As of January 2017, Rocket Languages had 1.2 million users worldwide.

== Awards ==
- 2008 Ranked 34th in the Deloitte/Unlimited Fast50 index.
- 2008 Ranked 303rd in the Deloitte Technology Fast 500 Asia Pacific ranking.
