= The Prophecy (disambiguation) =

The Prophecy is a 1995 horror film.

The Prophecy may also refer to:

== Literature ==
- "The Prophecy" (German: "Die Weissagung"), a 1905 short story by Arthur Schnitzler
- "The Prophecy", a short story by Eden Phillpotts, featured in the 1925 collection Up Hill, Down Dale: A Volume of Short Stories
- "The Prophecy", a 1934 short story by Hugh B. Cave
- "The Prophecy", a 1968 short story by Bill Pronzini
- "The Prophecy", a short story by Alice Low, featured in the 1985 collection The Macmillan Book of Greek Gods and Heroes
- The Prophecy, a 1987 novel by Peter Danielson
- The Prophecy (Applegate novel), a 1999 novel by Katherine Applegate; the thirty-fourth installment in the Animorphs series
- The Prophecy, a 2004 novel by Lynne Ewing; the eleventh installment in the Daughters of the Moon series
- The Prophecy, a 2006 novel by Hilari Bell
- The Prophecy (Kuzneski novel), a 2009 novel by Chris Kuzneski
- The Prophecy, a 2018 novel by Jennifer L. Armentrout; the fourth installment in the Titan series

== Music ==
=== Bands ===
- The Prophecy (reggae band), a band from Mauritius
- The Prophecy (English band), a British doom metal band

=== Albums ===
- The Prophecy (Defiance album), 2009
- The Prophecy (Steed Lord album), an album by the Icelandic group Steed Lord
- The Prophecy (Stigmata of the Immaculate), an album by the Canadian death metal band Kataklysm
- The Prophecy (Thunderlip album), 2007
- The Prophecy: Live in Europe, 2013 album by Painkiller
- The Prophecy (Ninja Sex Party album), 2020

=== Songs ===
- "The Prophecy", a song from Music of The Lord of the Rings film series
- "The Prophecy", a song by Immortal Technique from the 2001 album Revolutionary Vol. 1
- "The Prophecy", a song by Iron Maiden, from their 1988 album Seventh Son of a Seventh Son
- "The Prophecy", a song by Jinjer from the 2019 album Macro
- "The Prophecy", a song by Neaera from the 2010 album Forging the Eclipse
- "The Prophecy", a song by The Network, from their 2020 album Money Money 2020 Part II: We Told Ya So!
- "The Prophecy", a song by Taylor Swift from the 2024 album The Tortured Poets Department: The Anthology

== Television ==
- "The Prophecy", Adventure Time: Side Quests episode 19 (2026)
- "The Prophecy", Alias season 1, episode 16 (2002)
- "The Prophecy", Celebrity Deathmatch season 2, episode 16 (1999)
- "The Prophecy", City of Dreams season 2, episode 6 (2021)
- "The Prophecy", Fantaghirò episode 1 (1999)
- "The Prophecy", Ironside (1967) season 1, episode 18 (1969)
- "The Prophecy", Legend Quest (2017) season 1, episode 1 (2017)
- "The Prophecy", Mutant X season 3, episode 20 (2004)
- "The Prophecy", Robin of Sherwood season 2, episode 1 (1985)
- "The Prophecy", Teen Titans season 4, episode 7 (2005)
- "The Prophecy", The Magician (French) episode 9 (1998)
- "The Prophecy", The Odyssey season 2, episode 6 (1994)
- "The Prophecy", The Waltons season 4, episode 4 (1975)
- "The Prophecy", Theodosia series 2, episode 46 (2024)
- "The Prophecy", Tidelands episode 7 (2018)
- "The Prophecy", Valt the Wonder Deer season 1, episode 16 (2016)

== Other uses ==
- La profecía (literally "The Prophecy"), the Spanish release title of the 1976 film The Omen
- The Prophecy (film series), a film franchise based on the 1995 film
- The Prophecy (video game)

== See also ==
- Prophecy (disambiguation)
