= Conservation and restoration of outdoor murals =

The conservation and restoration of outdoor murals is the process of caring for and maintaining murals, and includes documentation, examination, research, and treatment to insure their long-term viability, when desired.

== History ==
Murals are most commonly defined as wall paintings, works of art integrated into a specific architectural space. The word mural is derived from the Latin word murus, meaning wall. Walls have long provided a direct support for aesthetic, political, and social ideas expressed with paint. Cave paintings could be considered the earliest murals, followed over time by wall paintings in tombs, temples, churches, civic buildings, and a variety of outdoor spaces. Modern murals grow out of this long tradition. From the beginning of the 20th century, murals have had a significant presence in the architecture of the Americas. Through the years murals have changed just as everyday life has changed. Murals were painted on church walls and carved into stone or wood on the outside, to educate those who cannot read. The tradition has carried on to today’s churches. Visual images and language are one of the most powerful forms of communication, both then and more so now. Murals today share much of the history from past murals, though today’s murals can depict anything. The major job of murals today is to band communities together. Murals have a very positive effect on communities, bring people together and bring pride to the community, and that pride tends to stay and spread to other parts of the community.

== Deterioration ==
Outdoor contemporary murals are generally seen as temporary installations, varying from 10 to 20 years due to weathering and vandalism. Outdoor murals are susceptible to, depending on their physical location, extreme weather conditions. A few of the biggest problems facing murals are graffiti, physical destruction, and desaturation as the paint layers weather and are exposed to UV. UV radiation causes cracking, color change and fading. Oxidation chain reactions are the culprit on a chemical level. Environmental conditions are a major factor in mural deterioration. Freeze-thaw cycles and capillary rise affect the architectural support of the mural and lead to salt efflorescence, cracking, and lifting of the paint layers if incompatible paints or coatings are used and the mural extends to ground level. Murals that face south in direct UV rays are susceptible to fading and also binder deterioration.

== Conservation ==
Murals are traditionally commissioned on private buildings and structures, leaving ownership of the mural in the hands of the owner of the building. Gaining permission to conduct conservation is a key first step in the process. Annual inspections of murals will contribute to extending their lifetimes. Inspections are encouraged to take place during the spring season as this will allow for any damage done during the winter months to not be overlooked, and will also allow for conservation to take place during the summer.

=== Preventive conservation ===
Preventive conservation can take place before a mural begins. Such as preparing the wall properly and using high-quality, lightfast, and compatible materials—is fundamental. Other preventive actions (e.g., regular maintenance, graffiti removal, and community awareness) can help preserve murals. Much of the damage seen on murals is due to vandalism and a lack of maintenance. Sadly, regular maintenance is not always a priority. Building maintenance is also important to the life of the mural. Communities are aware of well-respected buildings, community engagement is important to continue to spread the word about preserving the sight of the mural. Continue to maintain the grounds that the building resides on. A well-maintained building will deter vandalism and also littering around the property.

=== Graffiti ===
Graffiti plagues the presence of many murals, especially those found within city limits. Graffiti is often seen as a form of territory, and once it premieres on a location it invites others to participate in the act of vandalism. Involving the youth of the community with mural project directly is seen as a way to prevent future graffiti, giving them a profound connection and education with and about the project.

If graffiti is present on a mural, it must be removed in a safe and effective manner that does not directly harm the image beneath it. For this reason, removal should be undertaken by a conservator or an artist/technician familiar with the piece after consultation with or under the supervision of a conservator. Removal without adequate testing, or by an individual without adequate experience or supervision, can irreparably harm the mural.

=== Treatment ===
As murals deteriorate, owners and agencies have several treatment options. They may ask the artist to repaint or restore the work, or they may call a conservator who could either treat the mural according to strict conservation guidelines or work with the artist to conserve and possibly restore the work. With contemporary murals, there are many instances of restoration or even re-creation. Before this takes place it is advised to look back for an existing plan set out before the mural project began planning the steps of its conservation, if and when needed. This document should articulate who will be the lead of the project; conservator, artist, committee etc. and will also state who will approve the conservation work need to be performed.

A conservator should ideally perform the analysis of the state of the mural and outline procedures and materials need to be performed. This should all then be taken into consideration with the expectations of the community and also the owner of the mural (owner of the building).

== Resources ==
The Heritage Preservation has provided links for Mural Programs and websites worldwide.

== See also ==
- Conservation and restoration of outdoor artworks
- Paintings conservator
