= Proffitt =

Proffitt is a surname. Notable people with the name include:

- Cy Proffitt (1911–1996), American basketball player
- Ethel Maude Proffitt Stephenson (née Ethel Maude Proffitt) (1895–1982), American lawyer
- Frank Proffitt (1913–1965), Appalachian old-time banjoist and performer
- Kathryn Linda Haycock Proffitt (born 1951), American diplomat
- Michael Proffitt, Scottish chief editor for the Oxford English Dictionary
- Morgan Proffitt (born 1994), American soccer player
- Paine Proffitt (born 1972), American-born artist living in England
- Shane Profitt, American musician
- Stanley Proffitt (1910–1999), English cricketer
- Steve Proffitt, American radio journalist
- Tommy Proffitt (1927–2023), British boxer

== Other uses ==
- Proffitt's, an American department store chain based in Alcoa, Tennessee, from 1919 to 2006
- Thacher Proffitt & Wood, an American law firm headquartered in New York City from 1848 to 2008

== See also ==
- Proffit (disambiguation)
- Profit (disambiguation)
