= Remy Zero =

American rock band

- Remy Zero, L-R: Cedric LeMoyne, Cinjun Tate, Jeffrey Cain, Shelby Tate, Gregory Slay

Background information
- Origin: Birmingham, Alabama, US
- Genre: Alternative rock
- Years active: 1989–2003; 2010; 2025
- Labels: Capitol; Geffen; DGC; Warner/Elektra
- Spinoffs: Spartan Fidelity
- Past members: Gregory Slay; Cinjun Tate; Shelby Tate; Jeffrey Cain; Cedric LeMoyne; Louis Schefano
- Website: remyzero.com

Remy Zero was an American alternative rock band from Birmingham, Alabama, formed in 1989. It was composed of the brothers Cinjun Tate (vocals, guitar), Shelby Tate (guitar, vocals, keyboards), Cedric LeMoyne (bass), Jeffrey Cain (guitar, vocals), and Louis Schefano (drums), who was later replaced by Gregory Slay (drums, percussion).

== History ==
The band was formed in Alabama in the late 1980s while the members were teenagers. The name Remy Zero came from an Alabama railroad worker featured in a box of 4-track tapes with 30 hours of songs, conversations, and trainyard sounds. Cinjun Tate reported in the Evening Times, "We decided to name the band after him in the hope that we might track down his relatives or something. We haven't found anyone yet." However, in an MTV interview, Tate described Remy Zero as a fictional prophet they had created.

Before Remy Zero had released any full-length albums, Radiohead found their demo tape and invited them to be part of the US tour for The Bends. After that, Remy Zero moved from Alabama to Los Angeles to record their first album.

The self-titled record received little recognition or sales. The subsequent album, Villa Elaine, generated some acclaim. It was recorded when the band was living in an apartment of the same name in Hollywood. Remy Zero's third album, The Golden Hum, was also received well. A 50-second version of the song "Save Me" from The Golden Hum was used as the theme song for WB/CW's Smallville during its ten-season run. The band's music was also featured on KCRW's Morning Becomes Eclectic radio show. The song "Shattered" was used in the films Crazy/Beautiful and Suicide Kings. "Fair", from Villa Elaine, was used in the films Garden State and Fanboys, "Prophecy" in She's All That and The Last Kiss, "Gramarye" appeared in Stigmata, and "Temenos (Here Come the Shakes)" played in the film The Chamber. Additionally, "Perfect Memory" played during the film The Invisible and the last episode of Smallville's first season. Remy Zero recorded a version of Art Garfunkel's song "Bright Eyes" for the 2002 charity album For the Kids.

The band broke up after making The Golden Hum, and many of its members went on to join new bands. Shelby and Cinjun formed Spartan Fidelity, which released the album Excava-11 in 2004. Cain joined Isidore and later created Dead Snares. LeMoyne toured with Alanis Morissette's band, before joining O+S and later Rose of the West. Gregory Slay created Sleepwell.

Drummer Gregory Slay died on January 1, 2010, aged 40, of complications from cystic fibrosis.

On May 22, 2010, Remy Zero played their first show together in eight years as a tribute to Gregory in New Orleans, the town where he was born. This was followed by the release of the new single "'Til the End" on the label Popantipop, on September 7, 2010. From October 7 to 12, 2010, Remy Zero performed in memory of their drummer at venues including Dante's in Portland, Oregon, The Crocodile Cafe in Seattle, Cafe Du Nord in San Francisco, and in Spaceland in Los Angeles. The band's Twitter account confirmed that these shows would be the final word from the band.

On October 18, 2011, Gregory Slay's final solo album, released under the moniker Horsethief Beats, titled The Sound Will Find You, featured Remy Zero bandmates Jeffrey Cain and Cedric Lemoyne and was published on the Communicating Vessels label. Jeffrey Cain is now a member of the Australian band the Church, best known for their 1988 hit song "Under the Milky Way".

Cinjun Tate composed the music for Amy Jo Johnson's 2016 movie, The Space Between.

In 2020, a mostly new studio recording, featuring Shelby and Cinjun Tate, was released digitally under the name Zero Brothers.

In March 2025, Remy Zero performed at the Greek Theatre in Los Angeles as part of a charity concert to celebrate the 20th anniversary of Garden State, alongside the Shins, Iron & Wine, Cary Brothers, and Laufey.

== Band members ==
- August Cinjun Tate – vocals, guitar
- Shelby Tate – guitar, vocals, keyboards
- Jeffrey Cain – guitar
- Cedric LeMoyne – bass
- Louis Schefano – drums (1989–1996)
- Gregory Slay – drums (c. 1996–2003)

Touring

- Leslie Van Trease – guitar, keyboards
- Chip Kilpatrick – drums (2010)

== Discography ==
=== Studio albums ===
Year	Title	Chart positions	
Year	Title	US Heat.	NZ
1996	Remy Zero	—	—
1998	Villa Elaine	37	—
2001	The Golden Hum	20	39

=== EPs ===
Title	Details
Live on Morning Becomes Eclectic	Released: 1998; Label: Geffen; Formats: Promo CD
A Searchers EP	Released: November 2001; Label: Elektra; Formats: Promo CD
Remy Zero EP	Released: October 2010; Label: Communicating Vessels; Formats: CD

=== Singles ===
Year	Title	Peak chart positions						Album
Year	Title	US Mod.	US Main.	US Adult.	FRA	NZ	UK	Album
1996	"Temenos (Here Come the Shakes)"	—	—	—	—	—	—	Remy Zero
1998	"Prophecy"	27	25	—	—	—	—	Villa Elaine
1998	"Problem"	—	—	—	—	—	—	Villa Elaine
1999	"Gramarye"	—	—	—	—	—	—	Villa Elaine
2001	"Save Me"	27	—	33	16	46	55	The Golden Hum
2001	"Perfect Memory (I'll Remember You)"	—	—	—	—	—	—	The Golden Hum
2010	"'Til the End"	—	—	—	—	—	—	Remy Zero EP
