= A Searchers EP =

EP by Remy Zero
- Released: November 2000
- Genre: Alternative rock

Remy Zero chronology
The Golden Hum (2000)	A Searchers EP (2000)	Remy Zero (EP) (2010)

A Searchers EP is a 2002 EP by Remy Zero released in the United States by Elektra Records designed to promote the band.

== Track listing ==
No.	Title	Length
1.	"Bitter" (Demo)	4:11
2.	"Belong" (Live)	3:52
3.	"Someday At Christmas" (Keyboards – Bob Ebeling)	2:52
4.	"Prophecy" (Live)	3:29
5.	"The Searchers"	3:22

== Credits ==
- Engineer – Bob Ebeling (track 3), David Slovis (track 2), Greg Duffin (track 2), Remy Zero (tracks 1+5)
- Mixed By – Bob Ebeling (track 3), Chris Gibbons, Remy Zero (tracks 1, 3+5)
- Photography – Jaimie Trueblood
- Producer – Remy Zero (tracks 1, 3+5)
- Recorded By – Chris Gibbons
