= Kyle M. Weeks =

American politician (died 1955)

Member of the Virginia House of Delegates from the Bedford, Franklin and Floyd counties district
- In office 1924–1926

Personal details
- Born: Kyle Menefee Weeks
- Died: July 20, 1955 (aged 66) Roanoke, Virginia, U.S.
- Resting place: Jacksonville Cemetery
- Spouse: Wilma Cox
- Education: Roanoke College (BA); Washington and Lee University School of Law; Yale Law School (JD)
- Occupation: Politician; lawyer

Kyle Menefee Weeks (died July 20, 1955) was an American politician and lawyer from Virginia. He served as a member of the Virginia House of Delegates.

== Early life ==
Kyle Menefee Weeks graduated from Roanoke College with a Bachelor of Arts. He graduated from Washington and Lee University School of Law and did post-graduate work at Yale Law School and graduated from there with a Juris Doctor in 1915.

== Career ==
Weeks began practicing law in 1916 in Floyd, Virginia. He practiced law with Joseph E. Proffit in the law firm Proffit and Weeks his entire career, up until his death. He served in World War I.

Weeks served in the Virginia House of Delegates, representing Bedford, Franklin and Floyd counties, in 1924 and 1926. In 1937, he managed Saxon W. Holt's campaign for lieutenant governor.

In 1945, Weeks was named alongside his law partner Profitt for aiding and abetting William Reeves Gardner in misapplying funds of Farmers and Merchants Bank of Fredericksburg. In April 1947, he was found guilty on twelve counts in the indictment and sentenced to 12 months of imprisonment and a fine of US$6,000. In January 1948, he was fined US$5,000 for his involvement.

== Personal life ==
Weeks married Wilma Cox, daughter of Luke Cox, of Fairfield in Floyd, on September 20, 1935. He was a member of Zion Lutheran Church.

Weeks died on July 20, 1955, aged 66, at a hospital in Roanoke. He was buried in Jacksonville Cemetery.
