= The Golden Hum =

Studio album by Remy Zero
- Released: September 18, 2001
- Genre: Alternative rock
- Length: 52:32
- Label: Elektra
- Producer: Jack Joseph Puig

Remy Zero chronology
Live On Morning Becomes Eclectic (1998)	The Golden Hum (2001)	A Searchers EP (2000)

Professional ratings
Review scores
Source	Rating
AllMusic	3/5 stars

The Golden Hum is the third and final studio album by American band Remy Zero, released in 2001, produced for Elektra Records. The album became popular for the song "Save Me", which was featured as the theme song for the TV show Smallville on The WB and The CW. The song "Perfect Memory" was featured in two other episodes of the show (in seasons 1 and 4). "Perfect Memory" was also used in the film The Invisible.

== Track listing ==
No.	Title	Length
1.	"The Golden Hum"	2:42
2.	"Glorious #1"	3:20
3.	"Out/In"	3:19
4.	"Bitter"	3:55
5.	"Perfect Memory"	4:44
6.	"Save Me"	4:44
7.	"Belong"	3:51
8.	"Over the Rails & Hollywood High"	5:12
9.	"Smile"	4:09
10.	"I'm Not Afraid"	2:58
11.	"Impossibility"	13:38
Total length:		52:32

== Credits ==
- Backing Vocals - The Unnatural Choir and their Pets
- Engineer [Assistant] - Chris Steffen, Richard Ash
- Engineer [Cole Stages] - Mr. Colson
- Engineer [Digital] - Jason Lader, Joe Zook, Lars Fox, Mr. Colson
- Engineer [Director Of Engineering] - Jack Joseph Puig
- Engineer [Ocean Way Recording] - Joe Zook
- Mastered By - Bob Ludwig
- Mixed By - Jack Joseph Puig
- Performer -Cedric LeMoyne, Cinjun Tate, Gregory Slay, Jeffrey Cain, Shelby Tate
- Performer [Additional Musicians] - Jason Lader, Lenny Castro, Leslie Van Trease, Paul Cantelon, Tim Pierce
- Producer - Jack Joseph Puig
