= She's All That =

1999 film by Robert Iscove

- Theatrical release poster
- Directed by: Robert Iscove
- Written by: R. Lee Fleming Jr.
- Produced by: Peter Abrams; Robert L. Levy; Richard N. Gladstein
- Starring: Freddie Prinze Jr.; Rachael Leigh Cook; Matthew Lillard; Paul Walker; Jodi Lyn O'Keefe; Kevin Pollak; Usher Raymond; Kimberly "Lil' Kim" Jones; Anna Paquin
- Cinematography: Francis Kenny
- Edited by: Casey O. Rohrs
- Music by: Stewart Copeland
- Production companies: Tapestry Films; FilmColony
- Distributed by: Miramax Films
- Release dates: January 19, 1999 (Westwood); January 29, 1999 (United States)
- Running time: 95 minutes
- Country: United States
- Language: English
- Budget: $7–10 million
- Box office: $103 million

She's All That is a 1999 American teen romantic comedy film directed by Robert Iscove. It stars Freddie Prinze Jr., Rachael Leigh Cook, Matthew Lillard, Paul Walker, Jodi Lyn O'Keefe, Kevin Pollak, Usher Raymond, Kimberly "Lil' Kim" Jones, and Anna Paquin. In the film, Zack Siler (Prinze Jr.) is a popular high school student who, after being dumped by his girlfriend, accepts a bet from his friend to transform Laney Boggs (Cook), a nerdy outcast, into the prom queen in six weeks. It is a modern adaptation of George Bernard Shaw's play Pygmalion and George Cukor's 1964 film My Fair Lady.

The film received mixed reviews from critics, who praised the performances of the lead actors, but were critical of the script. It was one of the most popular teen films of the late 1990s and reached number one at the box office in its first week of release. It went on to earn $103 million worldwide. After featuring in the film, the song "Kiss Me" reached number two on the Billboard Hot 100 and stayed in the top 10 for 16 weeks. A gender-swapped remake, titled He's All That, was released on Netflix on August 27, 2021.

== Plot ==
Zack Siler is a popular student at his Southern California high school. After returning from spring break, he discovers that his equally popular girlfriend Taylor has cheated on him with reality TV star Brock Hudson. As Zack's popularity wanes after Taylor breaks up with him, he proclaims that Taylor is replaceable with any girl in school. His friend Dean disagrees and challenges Zack to turn any random girl from school into the prom queen in six weeks. He accepts, so Dean chooses Laney Boggs, an awkward and unpopular art student.

Zack attempts to befriend Laney, but she pointedly ignores his advances, until he asks for her help with art. She reluctantly invites him to a performance art piece where she is performing. Intending to deter him, Laney volunteers Zack to perform onstage. He manages to improvise a routine with his hacky sack. Laney is impressed, but still rejects him when Zack attempts to charm her again.

When Zack shows up at her house, Laney reluctantly agrees to go to the beach with him and his friends, who invite her to a party later. Laney says she is busy, but Zack persuades her to go. He enlists his younger sister, Mack, to give her a makeover. At the party, Taylor, who is embarrassed by Brock and jealous of Laney, publicly humiliates her, bringing her to tears.

Laney is surprised to be nominated for prom queen, along with Taylor. Zack then goes by her house and asks about her mother, who died when Laney was a child. He talks about his father, who has been pressuring him to go to Dartmouth. Zack leans in to kiss Laney, but pulls back when she jokes that it is just to obtain her vote for prom king.

The next day, Zack defends Laney's younger brother, Simon, from bullies in the cafeteria. After a falling-out with Zack, Dean asks Laney to be his prom date. Taylor is humiliated when Brock dumps her, so she cozies up to Zack. When he turns her down, she tells him that Dean has already asked Laney to the prom. When Zack confronts him, Dean reveals the bet, forcing a public confession from Zack. A furious Laney rushes from the room, refusing to speak to Zack.

Unable to reconcile with Laney, Zack takes his sister to the prom. After some persuading from her father, a disheartened Laney agrees to go with Dean. At the dance, he boasts of his plan to seduce her. Laney's best friend, Jesse, overhears and he and Mack rush to warn Zack, who has taken the stage with Taylor as Prom King and Queen. Zack rushes after Laney, who has already left with Dean.

Laney returns home to find Zack there. She explains how she avoided Dean's advances with a foghorn. Zack confesses his true feelings, and they share a dance and kiss by the pool. Laney asks him about the bet, and he mysteriously says he will honor the terms. On the day of graduation, he appears onstage nude except for cap and a soccer ball, getting applause from the crowd, and a smile from Laney.

== Cast ==
- Freddie Prinze Jr. as Zack Siler
- Rachael Leigh Cook as Laney Boggs
- Matthew Lillard as Brock Hudson
- Paul Walker as Dean Sampson Jr.
- Jodi Lyn O'Keefe as Taylor Vaughan
- Kevin Pollak as Wayne Boggs
- Kieran Culkin as Simon Boggs
- Elden Henson as Jesse Jackson
- Usher Raymond as campus D.J.
- Kimberly "Lil' Kim" Jones as Alex Chason Sawyer
- Debbi Morgan as Ms. Rousseau
- Tim Matheson as Harlan Siler
- Anna Paquin as Mackenzie "Mack" Siler
- Gabrielle Union as Katarina "Katie" Darlingson
- Dulé Hill as Preston
- Tamara Mello as Chandler
- Clea DuVall as Misty
- Alexis Arquette as Mitch
- Dave Buzzotta as Jeffrey Munge Rylander
- Chris Owen as Derek Funkhouser Rutley
- Michael Milhoan as Principal Stickley
- Carlos Jacott as prom photographer
- Ashlee Levitch as Melissa
- Vanessa Lee Chester as Melissa's friend
- Patricia Charbonneau as Lois Siler
- Katharine Towne as Savannah
- Flex Alexander as Kadeem
- Amon Bourne as "She's All That" rapper
- Takbir Bashir as "She's All That" rapper
- Anthony "Click" Rivera as "She's All That" beatboxer
- Brandon Smith as JV cleaning boy
- Milo Ventimiglia as soccer player
- Sarah Michelle Gellar as girl in cafeteria (uncredited) (Note: Named in the credits under The Producers Wish to Thank, subsection They're All That.)

== Production ==
=== Casting ===
The film had an ensemble cast of up-and-coming actors, including Kieran Culkin, Academy Award winner Anna Paquin, Jodi Lyn O'Keefe, singer Usher Raymond, rapper Lil' Kim, Gabrielle Union in her film debut, and Dulé Hill. Producer Richard N. Gladstein noted, "There were other films that you could've seen them in, but they weren't usually the leads in those films." According to director Robert Iscove, Miramax co-head Harvey Weinstein was very involved in script development and casting, and was able to get great actors in very small parts as a personal favor.

Iscove said Josh Hartnett was considered for the role of Zack Siler, and many actresses were considered for the role of Laney Boggs, including Mena Suvari, Leelee Sobieski, and Jordana Brewster.

Kevin Pollak said he signed up for the movie in part because he was impressed with Freddie Prinze Jr.’s performance in The House of Yes a few years earlier and was interested in working with him.

=== Writing ===
R. Lee Fleming Jr. is officially credited as the sole screenwriter for the film. In a 2002 interview, M. Night Shyamalan stated that he polished the screenplay while adapting Stuart Little and writing a spec script for The Sixth Sense. This was also confirmed in the film's audio commentary by Iscove.

In 2013, Shyamalan claimed that, rather than simply polishing Fleming's original script, he actually ghost-wrote the film. This was disputed by Fleming. Jack Lechner (who served as Miramax's head of development in the late 1990s) confirmed that technically both Shyamalan and Fleming contributed to the script: Fleming wrote the initial script that Miramax bought, while Shyamalan did an uncredited rewrite (doing more than "a polish") that got the film green-lit. Lechner reiterated that content from both writers was included in the final cut of the film. Producer Richard N. Gladstein said that the script "was pretty much done" already, but that Shyamalan's changes "helped enormously with the relationship with Kevin Pollak [who played Laney's father, Wayne]". Iscove attributed the performance art piece and the hacky sack sequence to Shyamalan. Fleming attributed the line "Am I a fucking bet?" to Shyamalan. Fleming included various pop culture references in his script: Laney Boggs was named after two characters played by Winona Ryder, Kim Boggs from Edward Scissorhands and Laney Pierce from Reality Bites; the characters Zack and Taylor were named after two of the three members of the band Hanson. Pollak constantly guessing Jeopardy! answers incorrectly is a running joke, which he previously did in the 1997 film Truth or Consequences, N.M.. The idea was in Fleming's script but Pollak expanded and improvised his answers.

Iscove was influenced by the movies of John Hughes and was trying do something different for the '90s generation that would still resonate. He stressed the importance of the story having a heart, how Zack had to be worthy of Laney, and how Laney had to learn to be more open. The story was rewritten to better fit Prinze Jr. and make Zack a more sympathetic character with his own challenges. Iscove was well aware that it was implausible to suggest Rachael Leigh Cook was ugly, but said it was standard practice in Hollywood to cast "the beautiful girl" and that it requires the audience to suspend their disbelief: "You either go along with it or you don't go along with it." Comparing Laney's transformation to that of Clark Kent into Superman, Iscove said casting the role was more about finding an actor who had the range to give the necessary performance.

=== Filming ===
Filming took place from August 6, 1998, to September 28, 1998, in various California locations. The high school scenes were shot at Torrance High School, where television series Buffy the Vampire Slayer and Beverly Hills, 90210 were previously filmed.

Iscove was also a choreographer and wanted to expand and embellish the prom scenes, while also showing the Weinsteins how musical numbers could work in films. The dance scene was choreographed by Adam Shankman at the request of the film's co-producer Jennifer Gibgot, who is Shankman's sister. Shankman was assisted by Anne Fletcher. Shankman was concerned about the scene not tonally meshing with the rest of the film, but Iscove persisted. Test audiences did not understand why the dance scene was happening, so Bob Weinstein asked for a reshoot with Usher to link the scene. Shankman also worked with Matthew Lillard on his solo dance scenes.

Costume designer Denise Wingate said, "We had no budget so we had to be really creative—everything in that prom scene was white, black, and gold, and we got it all from The Salvation Army and just completely reworked it." Having majored in psychology, Wingate tried to explore the possible reasons for the characters’ wardrobe. Wingate concluded that Laney wore clothes like armor after the death of her mother, but also wanted to express herself as an artist, resulting in a mix of vintage clothes, overalls, aprons, and various quirky t-shirts. The falafel restaurant hat was created on short notice with items picked up from a Michaels craft store. Laney's transformation was reflected in the red dress, which demonstrated "a bold statement of her dressing in a color that was so different than anything we’d seen her in before." Cook recalled "feeling really self-conscious” in the scene where she first descends the stairs in the dress. There were two versions of the red dress: a stunt double dress reserved for the scene when Laney falls down in a driveway outside a party, and a second smaller dress, which left Cook holding her breath trying to get through the scene quickly.

== Soundtrack ==
The song "Kiss Me" was used as the main theme song. The film's box office success helped "Kiss Me" to gain widespread mainstream attention and chart success. It climbed to number two on the Billboard Hot 100 list, and stayed in the Top 10 for 16 straight weeks and number four in the United Kingdom and New Zealand.

No.	Title	Writer(s)	Performer(s)	Length
1.	"Prophecy"	Cinjun Tate, Shelby Tate, Cedric Lemoyne, Jeffrey Cain Thompson, Gregory Slay	Remy Zero
2.	"Baby Got Going"	Liz Phair & Scott Litt	Liz Phair
3.	"Be Free"	apl.de.ap, will.i.am, Stahl, Goldberg	The Black Eyed Peas
4.	"Blacktop Beat"	Lucas MacFadden	Jurassic 5
5.	"Up to Us"	Allrighse, Robin Thicke	Allrighse
6.	"Wanderer"	J. Ralph	Spy
7.	"Sugar"	Jo Lloyd, James Wright, David Magee	Stretch Princess
8.	"Kiss Me"	Matt Slocum	Sixpence None the Richer
9.	"Test the Theory"	Robin File, Sean McCann, Martin Merchant & Robert Maxfield	Audioweb
10.	"Gorgeous"	Kat Green	Girl Next Door
11.	"Ooh La La"	Theo Keating	The Wiseguys
12.	"Give It to Me Baby"	Rick James	Rick James
13.	"Shuck & Jive"	John Davis	Superdrag
14.	"Hanging On"	Emily Gerber and Carlos Calvo	Emily & Carlos
15.	"66"	Greg Dulli	The Afghan Whigs
16.	"Nonstop Operation"	MC Tunes, S. Hickling, S. Jones, M. Lawrence, G. Gasper, P. Billington	The Dust Junkys
17.	"The Rockafeller Skank"	Fatboy Slim, Terry Winford, John Barry	Fatboy Slim
18.	"Believe"	Goldie	Goldie

== Reception ==
=== Critical response ===
On the review aggregation website Rotten Tomatoes, the film holds an approval rating of 43% based on 61 reviews. The website's critics consensus reads, "Despite its charming young leads, She's All That can't overcome its predictable, inconsistently funny script." On Metacritic, which assigns a weighted average score out of 100 to reviews from mainstream critics, the film received an average score of 51, based on reviews from 32 critics, indicating "mixed or average" reviews.

It was the last film to be reviewed by Gene Siskel before his death in February 1999. Siskel gave a positive review, saying it "is like a teenage version of My Fair Lady" and praised Cook for her performance, "Laney, the plain Jane object of the makeover, is forced to demonstrate the biggest emotional range as a character, and she is equal to the assignment." Roger Ebert noted the lack of originality in the story, as Pygmalion and My Fair Lady had done it first, but suggested: "To give the movie credit, it's as bored with the underlying plot as we are. Even the prom queen election is only a backdrop for more interesting material, as She's All That explores differences in class and style, and peppers its screenplay with very funny little moments." Ebert says it "is not a great movie, but it has its moments", giving it 2.5 out of 4 stars. Stephen Holden of The New York Times praised Cook for her performance, comparing her to Winona Ryder, saying, "Unlike so many actors playing smart young people, she actually projects some intelligence along with a sly sense of comedy."

Mick LaSalle of the San Francisco Chronicle calls it "About one idea short of being an excellent teenage romance. As it stands it's a pleasing but routine effort." LaSalle criticized the film for running out of plot about halfway, saying the "story line is stretched to the breaking point. In one instance, director Robert Iscove stops the action for a long dance sequence, set at the prom, that has nothing to do with anything." He commented the film is "intermittently funny" and praised Matthew Lillard's performance, calling it the best thing in the picture.

Geoff Berkshire of Variety was critical of the lack of originality, and wrote, "Suggesting that Miramax needs to put Kevin Williamson on permanent retainer if it's going to remain in the teen-pics field, She's All That notably fails to bring to comedy the insight that the Williamson-penned Scream brought so memorably to horror". Berkshire was positive about the two leads, saying "appealing young actors come off as competent, nothing more, given a context that can't be transcended." He described the direction as "nothing to be ashamed of here, but nothing of any distinction, either", and noted the soundtrack as a not unexpected plus. Jane Ganahl of the San Francisco Examiner wrote, "And once, just once, I'd love to see a teen flick that doesn't send out a message to young girls that to be acceptable, you have to conform. I liked the artist girl much better before."

William Thomas of Empire criticized the film, saying that despite a few scenes, "The rest is just breezy propaganda for American high school fascism", and "The most worrying thing about She's All That is its message. The 'ugly duckling' (specs, dungarees, art-lover) must conform (she gets a makeover and the boys notice her "bobos" for the first time) to fit in."

=== Box office ===
She's All That premiered on January 19, 1999, at the Mann Festival Theater in Westwood, Los Angeles. The film went into general release on January 29. It was released in Italy under the title Kiss Me.

The film reached number one at the box office in the first week of its release, grossing $16.1 million over the Super Bowl opening weekend. It earned $63.4 million in the United States and $39.8 million at international box offices, totaling $103 million worldwide against a production budget between $7–10 million. Miramax spent a further $18 million on television advertising to promote the film.

=== Accolades ===
Year	Ceremony	Category	Recipients	Result
1999	YoungStar Awards	Best Performance by a Young Actress in a Comedy Film	Rachael Leigh Cook	Won
1999	Teen Choice Awards	Choice Movie Actor	Freddie Prinze Jr.	Won
1999	Teen Choice Awards	Choice Movie: Love Scene	Freddie Prinze Jr. & Rachael Leigh Cook	Won
1999	Teen Choice Awards	Choice Movie: Comedy		Nominated
1999	MTV Movie Awards	Best Breakthrough Female Performance	Rachael Leigh Cook	Nominated
1999	MTV Movie Awards	Best On-Screen Duo	Freddie Prinze Jr. & Rachael Leigh Cook	Nominated
2000	Young Hollywood Awards	Best Bad Girl	Jodi Lyn O'Keefe	Won
2000	Young Hollywood Awards	Best Song	Sixpence None the Richer ("Kiss Me")	Won
2000	Kids' Choice Awards	Favorite Movie Couple	Freddie Prinze Jr. & Rachael Leigh Cook	Won
2000	Blockbuster Entertainment Awards	Favorite Actress – Newcomer (Internet Only)	Rachael Leigh Cook	Won
2000	Blockbuster Entertainment Awards	Favorite Actor – Comedy/Romance	Freddie Prinze Jr.	Nominated
2000	ASCAP Film and Television Music Awards	Most Performed Songs from Motion Pictures	Matt Slocum ("Kiss Me")	Won
2000	ALMA Awards	Outstanding Actor in a Feature Film	Freddie Prinze Jr.	Nominated

== Home media ==
Miramax Home Entertainment released the film on DVD and VHS on July 13, 1999. It also received a U.S. LaserDisc release on July 27, 1999.

In 2010, Miramax was sold by The Walt Disney Company (their owners since 1993), with the studio being taken over by private equity firm Filmyard Holdings that same year. Filmyard sublicensed the home media rights for several Miramax titles to Lionsgate. On January 3, 2012, Lionsgate Home Entertainment released She's All That on Blu-ray.

Filmyard Holdings sold Miramax to Qatari company beIN Media Group during March 2016. In April 2020, ViacomCBS (now known as Paramount Skydance) acquired the rights to Miramax's library, after buying a 49% stake in the studio from beIN. She's All That was one of the 700 titles Paramount acquired in the deal.

Paramount Home Entertainment reissued the film on DVD and Blu-ray on September 22, 2020, with this being one of many Miramax titles that they reissued around this time. Paramount made it available on their subscription streaming service Paramount+, which launched in 2021, as well as on their free streaming service Pluto TV. In Australia, it was also on the streaming service for the Paramount-owned broadcaster Network 10.

== Remake ==
In September 2020, a gender-swapped remake of the film was announced, titled He's All That, with Mark Waters to direct, original screenwriter R. Lee Fleming Jr. to write, and starring Addison Rae and Tanner Buchanan. That October, Myra Molloy, Madison Pettis, Peyton Meyer, Isabella Crovetti, and Annie Jacob were cast.

In December 2020, Rachael Leigh Cook joined the cast to portray Rae's character's mother. It has been confirmed that Cook's character is unrelated to her original character. He's All That was released on Netflix on August 27, 2021. It was produced by Miramax, under their new Paramount/beIN Media Group co-ownership.

== See also ==
- Not Another Teen Movie (2001), a teen parody film in which the primary plotline heavily spoofs this film.
