= Profit =

Profit may refer to:

== Business and law ==
- Profit (accounting), the difference between the purchase price and the costs of bringing to market
- Profit (economics), normal profit and economic profit
- Profit (real property), a nonpossessory interest in land
- Account of profits, a type of equitable remedy in law (also known as an accounting)

== Arts, entertainment, and media ==
- Profit (magazine), Canadian business magazine aimed at entrepreneurs
- Profit (TV series), U.S. TV series starring Adrian Pasdar
- The Profit (film), U.S. 2001 feature film by Peter N. Alexander
- The Profit (TV series), U.S. TV series presented by Marcus Lemonis

== People ==
- Joe Profit (born 1959), former American football player
- Laron Profit (born 1977), professional basketball player
- Richard Profit (born 1974), English mountaineer and adventurer
- Park "Profit" Joon-yeong, professional Overwatch player

== Places ==
- Profit, United States Virgin Islands

== See also ==
- Proffit (disambiguation)
- Proffitt (disambiguation)
- Prophet (disambiguation)
