= Conservation and restoration of outdoor artworks =

The conservation and restoration of outdoor artworks is the activity dedicated to the preservation and protection of artworks that are exhibited or permanently installed outside. These works may be made of wood, stone, ceramic material, plastic, bronze, copper, or any other number of materials and may or may not be painted. When applied to cultural heritage this activity is generally undertaken by a conservator-restorer.

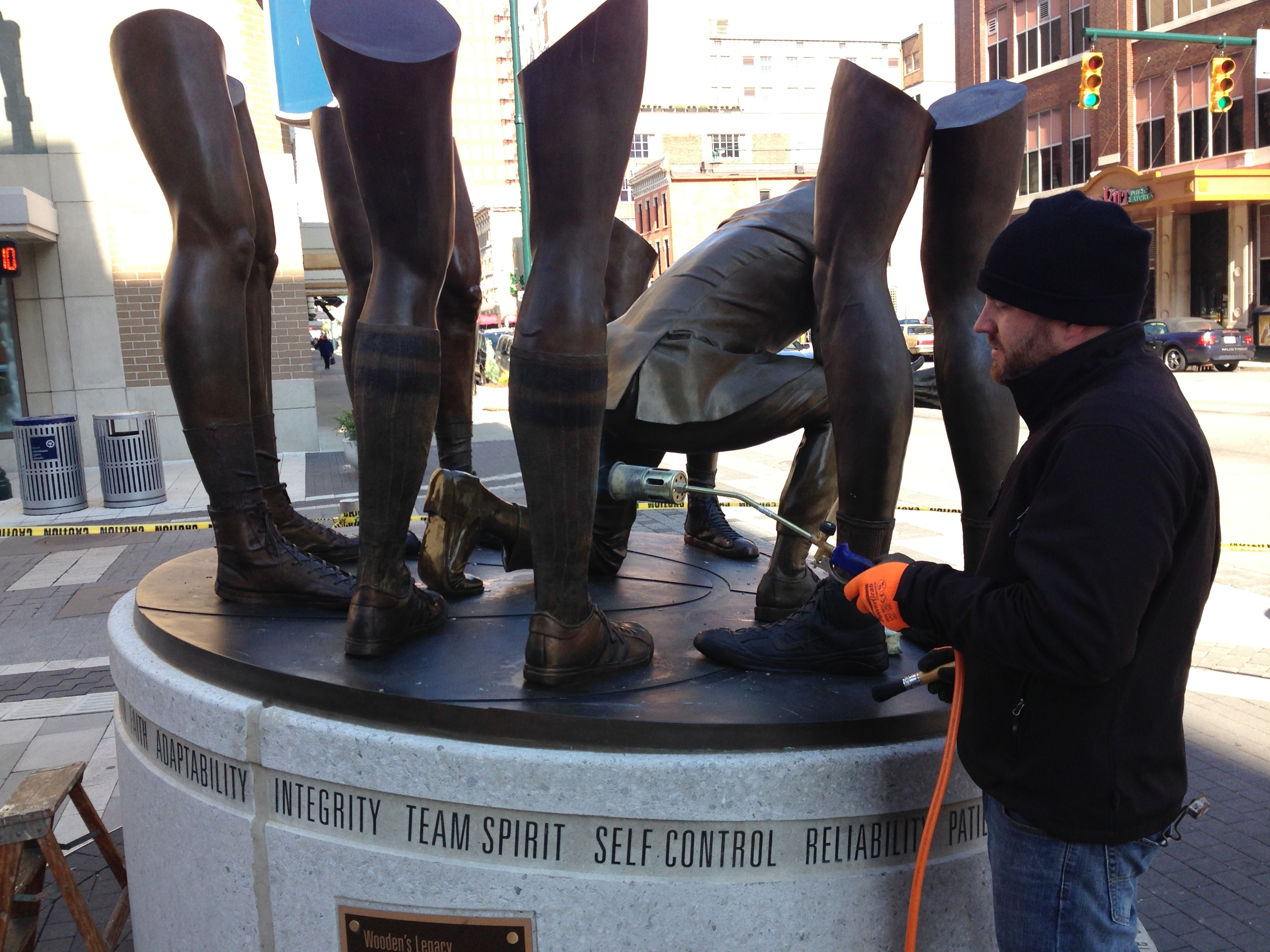
Artist Brose Partington applies wax using a torch to a bronze sculpture.

== Environmental issues ==
Unlike many works of cultural heritage, outdoor artworks are not exhibited in a controlled environment, where temperature and relative humidity are closely monitored. Though works may be more easily preserved in a controlled environment, they are installed outside to preserve the artist's intent, and avoid decontextualization. Instead, outdoor works are exposed to many and various environmental factors depending upon its geographic or site location and its configuration.

Environmental threats may include, but are not limited to rain, snow, acid rain, and earthquakes as well as fluctuations in temperature and relative humidity. They may also be exposed to excessive amounts of light as well as human intervention. Excessive rain and moisture can also lead to mold growth. Daily exposure to ultraviolet, visible, and infrared (IR) radiation has a detrimental effect on painted sculptures or those with organic or inorganic coatings. Excessive light exposure may cause color alterations and loss as well as structural breakdowns in the paint and coatings.

Air pollution can also adversely affect outdoor artworks. In addition to meteorological conditions, traditional outdoor pollutants including sulfur dioxide, nitrogen oxides, and ozone affect the various composite materials. The specific level and type of air pollution degradation is dependent on the material and composition of the artwork as well as the length of exposure. Organic carbonyl pollutants are also an increasing threat due increased use of ethanol based fuels.

== Contemporary conservation methods ==
Though specific conservation methods are dependent on the material, condition, and environment for each artwork, there are some standard practices for outdoor works. These include condition assessment, treatment, preventive conservation, and maintenance.

=== Assessment of condition ===
Before any conservation treatment, a thorough condition assessment with written and photographic documentation is completed. This initial assessment may include research into the artist's working techniques or a discussion with the living artist, review of the conservation history of the object, and non-destructive analysis.

According to Virginia Naudé and Glenn Wharton, there are four steps that come with the assessment or survey of an outdoor sculpture:

1. Technical descriptions and condition assessments of each sculpture: Identification and exploration of materials, fabrication, past maintenance practices, surface condition, and structural integrity. This also includes an assessment of previous repairs, treatment and/or maintenance.
2. Maintenance recommendations for each sculpture: Recommendations based on the history, condition, and location of the sculpture, the resources of the owner, and the relative needs of the sculpture in the context of the whole collection. The maintenance recommendation should include information on routine care and periodic treatment.
3. Assignment of priorities to recommended activities: Conservator-assigned priorities based on the previously attained technical information. These priorities will later be assessed by stakeholders in relation to art historical, fund-raising, and other priorities.
4. Estimate of resources required: Includes labor costs of the various maintenance options proposed for conservators, technicians, and other specialists. An estimate of hours is particularly useful if the recommended work will not take place immediately. Supplies and equipment costs are also included.

=== Treatment of outdoor artworks ===
The treatment of outdoor artworks is multifaceted and dependent on the material type, condition, structural integrity, and exhibition conditions. A brief overview of conservation treatments by material is outlined below, and more thorough discussions are available on the individual conservation pages.

- Bronze sculptures: For many bronze sculptures and other metal sculptures, treatment includes a reduction buildup from previous protective coatings, removal of corrosion and incrustation, or cleaning. This may be done by hand, water blasting, air abrasion, or other methods. Then, a wax or wax composite is applied to the sculpture in sweeping motions. Finally, the wax is buffed with a cotton cloth.
- Ceramic sculptures: Ceramic sculptures are much less common than bronze sculptures, and require a different conservation and maintenance procedures. Mechanical and chemical cleaning methods may be used, and previous conservation treatments and adhesives may be removed. Next, consolidation of fragments and flaking glaze may be completed. For sculptures comprised with multiple ceramic parts joined with mortar, the grout may also require conservation intervention.
- Plastic sculptures: Plastic elements are prevalent in contemporary sculptures. Outdoor sculptures may be made entire or in part of polyester, epoxy, phenol, or acrylic materials. Unfortunately, treatment for plastic sculptures may be limited as some changes from degradation in plastics are not reversible.
- Painted sculptures: As Brian Consodine writes, painted sculptures are actually a multi-layered composition that can contain primers, paints, and protective coatings as well as the structural substrate. Problems that may occur with painted sculptures include degradation or alteration of color, cracking and flaking of paint, and failure of the primer layer which exposes the underlying primary support to the elements. Treatments for painted sculptures may include reduction of previous coatings and repairs, cleaning, consolidation, and inpainting of losses.

=== Preventive conservation ===
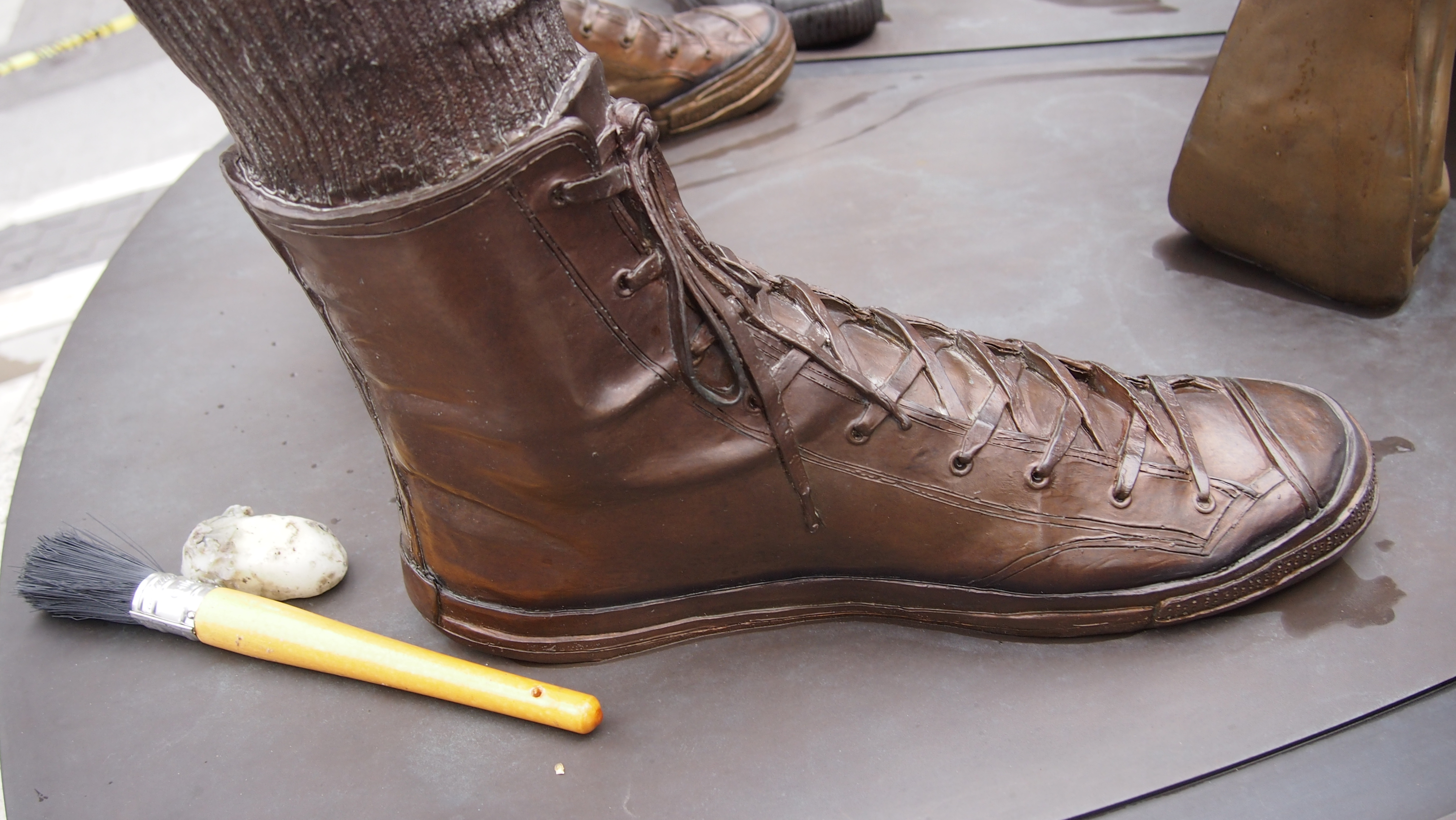
Wax and a brush used to maintain a bronze sculpture

Preventive conservation involves actions taken to delay deterioration of cultural heritage. For outdoor artworks, this usually involves the application of a protective coating and regular maintenance. The particular protective coating is chosen based on its durability, adhesion to the surface, ease of maintenance, and surface appearance on the work. The coating provides some protection from environmental factors, but must be occasionally be reduced and reapplied for best results. A long-term conservation schedule should be created and implemented to ensure the longevity of the artwork. A maintenance walk-through schedule should also be established to routinely check the condition of the objects. This may be a weekly procedure; it is useful as conservators can assess and document any damage caused by visitors or environmental conditions, and may rinse and wipe down sculptures.

== Tools and products ==
This section is an abbreviated list. For the detailed list, please refer to the conservation and restoration of outdoor bronze sculptures.

=== Wax ===
- Clear Trewax Brand Paste Wax
- Johnson Paste Wax
- Renaissance Wax
- Butcher’s Wax
- Liberon Special Effects Waxes[8]

=== Sealants/lacquers/corrosion inhibitors ===
- Incralac
- Cobratec 99.

=== Brushes ===
- "Chip" brushes.
- Soft bristled brushes

=== Non-ionic detergents ===
- Orvus
- Igepal CA-630
- Triton XL-80N
- Chemique Ion-417

== See also ==
- Wikipedia:WikiProject Public Art
- Conservation and restoration of ceramic objects
- Conservation and restoration of copper-based objects
- Conservation and restoration of ferrous objects
- Conservation and restoration of glass objects
- Conservation and restoration of immovable cultural property
- Conservation and restoration of ivory objects
- Conservation and restoration of metals
- Conservation and restoration of outdoor murals
- Conservation and restoration of outdoor bronze artworks
- Conservation and restoration of silver objects
- Restoration of the Statue of Liberty 1984–1986
- Restoration of sculptures (Commons Category)
