= Joseph E. Proffit =

American politician (1876–1958)

Member of the Virginia House of Delegates from the Floyd and Carroll counties district
- In office 1944–1956

Personal details
- Born: Joseph Edwin Proffit; March 24, 1876 Floyd, Virginia, U.S.
- Died: February 27, 1958 (aged 81) Roanoke, Virginia, U.S.
- Resting place: Jacksonville Cemetery
- Party: Republican
- Spouse: Anne Simmons
- Education: Danville Military Institute; College of William & Mary; Yale Law School
- Occupation: Politician; lawyer; bank president

Joseph Edwin Proffit (March 24, 1876 – February 27, 1958) was an American politician from Virginia. He served in the Virginia House of Delegates from 1944 to 1956.

== Early life ==
Joseph Edwin Proffit was born on March 24, 1876, in Floyd, Virginia. He was educated in public schools there. He graduated from Danville Military Institute, College of William & Mary and Yale Law School.

== Career ==
Proffit was an American consul in Johannesburg from 1902 to 1909. He practiced law in Floyd for 48 years. He practiced law with Kyle M. Weeks.

Proffit was a Republican. He served in the Virginia House of Delegates, representing Floyd and Carroll counties, from 1944 to 1956. He also served as chairman of the Republican committee in Floyd County.

Proffit was president of the Bank of Floyd. In 1945, Proffit was named alongside his law partner Weeks for aiding and abetting William Reeves Gardner in misapplying funds of Farmers and Merchants Bank of Fredericksburg. In April 1947, he was found guilty of one of two counts in the indictment and sentenced to three months of imprisonment and a fine of US$5,000. In January 1948, he was acquitted in the case. His law partner Weeks was fined for his involvement.

== Personal life ==
Proffit married Anne Simmons, daughter of George Simmons.

Proffit died on February 27, 1958, at a hospital in Roanoke. He was buried in Jacksonville Cemetery.
