= The Last Kiss (2006 film) =

- Theatrical release poster
- Directed by: Tony Goldwyn
- Screenplay by: Paul Haggis
- Based on: The Last Kiss by Gabriele Muccino
- Produced by: Gary Lucchesi; Tom Rosenberg; Marcus Viscidi; Andre Lamal
- Starring: Zach Braff; Jacinda Barrett; Casey Affleck; Rachel Bilson; Michael Weston; Eric Christian Olsen; Marley Shelton; Harold Ramis; Blythe Danner; Tom Wilkinson
- Cinematography: Tom Stern
- Edited by: Lisa Zeno Churgin
- Music by: Michael Penn
- Production company: Lakeshore Entertainment
- Distributed by: DreamWorks Pictures (through Paramount Pictures; North and Hispanic America, Germany and Austria); Lakeshore International (International)
- Release dates: September 10, 2006 (Deauville & Toronto); September 15, 2006 (United States)
- Running time: 104 minutes
- Country: United States
- Language: English
- Budget: $20 million
- Box office: $16 million

The Last Kiss is a 2006 American romantic comedy-drama film which is based on 2001 Italian film of the same name, directed by Gabriele Muccino. The plot revolves around a young couple and their friends struggling with adulthood and issues of relationships and commitment. The film stars Zach Braff, Jacinda Barrett, Casey Affleck and Rachel Bilson. The screenplay was written by Paul Haggis, and directed by Tony Goldwyn.

Much of The Last Kiss was filmed in and around Madison, Wisconsin. As with Garden State, Braff was involved with the film's soundtrack. The first teaser trailer was released on Braff's official website in mid-June 2006. The film premiered at the Deauville Film Festival and the Toronto International Film Festival on September 10, 2006, and was released by DreamWorks Pictures (through Paramount Pictures) on September 15, 2006. The film received mixed reviews, and grossed $16 million against a $20 million budget.

== Plot ==
A woman named Jenna is ten weeks pregnant. Her parents are pressuring Jenna and her live-in boyfriend Michael to get married. However, Michael is having second thoughts, despite considering Jenna an ideal companion. At a wedding, Michael meets a woman named Kim. She guesses that he is about to break up with Jenna and becomes flirtatious.

Michael later seeks Kim out at the Memorial Union but tells her that he was in the area only because of a client meeting. While Michael drives her home, Kim invites him to a party. In the office, Michael constructs an excuse to be away from Jenna on the night of the party. He asks Chris, his friend and co-worker, to cover for him in case Jenna calls. Chris suspects that Michael has met another woman and wishes to avoid becoming involved. Michael, however, denies the existence of another woman.

After the party, Kim and Michael kiss. She then invites him to her dorm for the night. Michael, however, refuses. The father of their mutual friend Izzy dies that night. Friends and acquaintances, including Jenna and Chris, go to Izzy's home with their condolences. There, Jenna realizes that Michael had lied to her.

When Michael arrives home that night, Jenna confronts Michael; who at first denies that he was out with Kim, but eventually admits the truth. Although he points out he did not have sex with her and that the outing meant nothing, Jenna is too enraged to believe him and kicks him out of the house.

Alone and depressed, Michael receives a call from Kim. She apologizes for being demanding earlier and asks him to come over to talk. Michael complies and the two have sex. The next morning, Michael tries sneaking away without waking Kim but notices once he gets out the door that he left his keys behind. Upon his return, Kim demands to know why he had not said goodbye. Michael says that he did not want to wake her, as he had to be at work early. Kim takes the missing keys out of her pocket and returns them after Michael promises to call her.

At work, Michael plans on leaving early to seek out Jenna. On his way out, Kim visits his office, wanting to give him a mix CD. Michael confides that Jenna is pregnant and that he still loves her. He apologizes to Kim for not telling her earlier, and leaves in search of Jenna.

Michael pulls up to the home of Jenna's parents. Jenna's father Stephen gives him a lecture about commitment and adulthood and offers advice on winning her forgiveness. He urges Michael to be honest and never stop trying. Michael then goes into Jenna's room. On the verge of reconciliation, Jenna asks if he was telling the truth about not having had sex with Kim. Michael says that he was telling the truth at the time—but then confesses that he went back later that night. Jenna becomes outraged, storming out of the house and back to their apartment.

Michael follows her back and finds himself locked out. He stakes out on the front porch until Jenna agrees to talk. For three days and two nights, Michael remains at the front door with many neighbors taking notice and some even providing beverages to him. Stephen even proceeds to drive by in his car and notices Michael, who sees him. He smiles while driving off. Slowly, she begins to relent, first tossing out a blanket during a cold evening, then dropping off a sandwich the next day. During the evening of what would have been his third night on the porch, Jenna speaks to Michael through the closed door. She compares the "last romantic kiss" to her grandmother's death. Jenna says that it was a kiss with painful feeling, and she laments about mourning the loss of the romantic relationship like the loss of someone's life. Later that evening, Jenna opens the door and Michael goes inside.

== Cast ==
- Zach Braff as Michael
- Jacinda Barrett as Jenna
- Casey Affleck as Chris
- Rachel Bilson as Kim
- Michael Weston as Izzy
- Eric Christian Olsen as Kenny
- Marley Shelton as Arianna
- Lauren Lee Smith as Lisa
- Harold Ramis as Professor Bowler
- Blythe Danner as Anna
- Tom Wilkinson as Stephen
- Danny Wells as Izzy's Uncle

== Release ==
The Last Kiss premiered at the Toronto International Film Festival. The film grossed $11.6 million in the United States and Canada and $4.2 million in other markets (including $2,508,416 in the United Kingdom) for a combined worldwide theatrical gross of $16 million.

== Reception ==
On Rotten Tomatoes, 46% of 130 reviews were positive, with an average rating of 5.7/10. The site's consensus reads: "You'll either find The Last Kiss to be a phony bore or a refreshing take about young 20-somethings at the crossroads between their carefree lifestyle and responsibility. Zach Braff and the rest of the appealing cast make the case for the latter." On Metacritic it has a weighted average score of 57 out of 100 at based on reviews from 27 critics.

Ruthe Stein of the San Francisco Chronicle praises the film for its originality saying "There's nothing formulaic in this story of four buddies on the cusp of 30 torn between settling down and opening themselves up to more adventures". Nathan Rabin of The AV Club gives the film a D− grade and is critical of the script saying "The Last Kiss bears the unmistakable Haggis touch, one as subtle and understated as an electric chainsaw through the spinal cord."

== Home media and rights ==
On December 26, 2006, the film was released on DVD in widescreen. On April 9, 2009, it was released on Blu-ray. In September 2008, the film's distributor DreamWorks Pictures split from Paramount Pictures and became an independent studio again, with Paramount's parent company Viacom having purchased DreamWorks in February 2006. However, after the split happened, Paramount still retained the rights to all of the live-action films DreamWorks had released since 1997, including The Last Kiss.

== Soundtrack ==
The soundtrack was released on September 4, 2006, on Lakeshore Records.

1. "Chocolate" by Snow Patrol
2. "Star Mile" by Joshua Radin
3. "Pain Killer" by Turin Brakes
4. "Warning Sign" by Coldplay
5. "Ride" by Cary Brothers
6. "El Salvador" by Athlete
7. "Hide and Seek" by Imogen Heap
8. "Reason Why" by Rachael Yamagata
9. "Hold You in My Arms" by Ray LaMontagne
10. "Prophecy" by Remy Zero
11. "Paper Bag" by Fiona Apple
12. "Today's the Day" by Aimee Mann
13. "Arms of a Woman" by Amos Lee
14. "Cigarettes and Chocolate Milk (Reprise)" by Rufus Wainwright
15. "Paperweight" by Schuyler Fisk and Joshua Radin

== See also ==
- Film industry in Wisconsin
