= Propheteer =

Propheteer or propheteering can mean:

- Propheteering, the practice of claiming to be a prophet in order to make money
- Propheteer, a player of prediction games
- Max Apple's novel The Propheteers
- The Propheteers, a musical group based in Asheville, North Carolina
- Propheteer, a post-hardcore band based in Great Falls, Montana, USA.
