= Prophecy (Remy Zero song) =

Single by Remy Zero

from the album Villa Elaine
- Released: 1998
- Genre: Alternative rock
- Length: 3:24
- Label: Geffen Records
- Songwriter(s): Gregory Slay, Cinjun Tate, Shelby Tate, Jeffrey Cain, Cedric LeMoyne

Remy Zero singles chronology
""Temenos (Here Come the Shakes)" (-)"	"Prophecy" (1998)	"Problem" (1998)

"Prophecy" is a song by rock band Remy Zero. Taken from their album Villa Elaine, it charted on both the United States Billboard Modern Rock Tracks chart and Mainstream Rock Tracks chart. The song was featured in the movies She's All That and The Last Kiss. The song featured in Charmed Episode #1.3 "Thank You For Not Morphing".

== Music video ==
The "Prophecy" music video showcases the band performing the song live.

== Promo CD track listing ==
1. "Prophecy" - 3:24

== Chart performance ==
Chart (1999)	Peak position
U.S. Billboard Modern Rock Tracks	27
U.S. Billboard Mainstream Rock Tracks	25
