= Conservation and restoration of outdoor bronze objects =

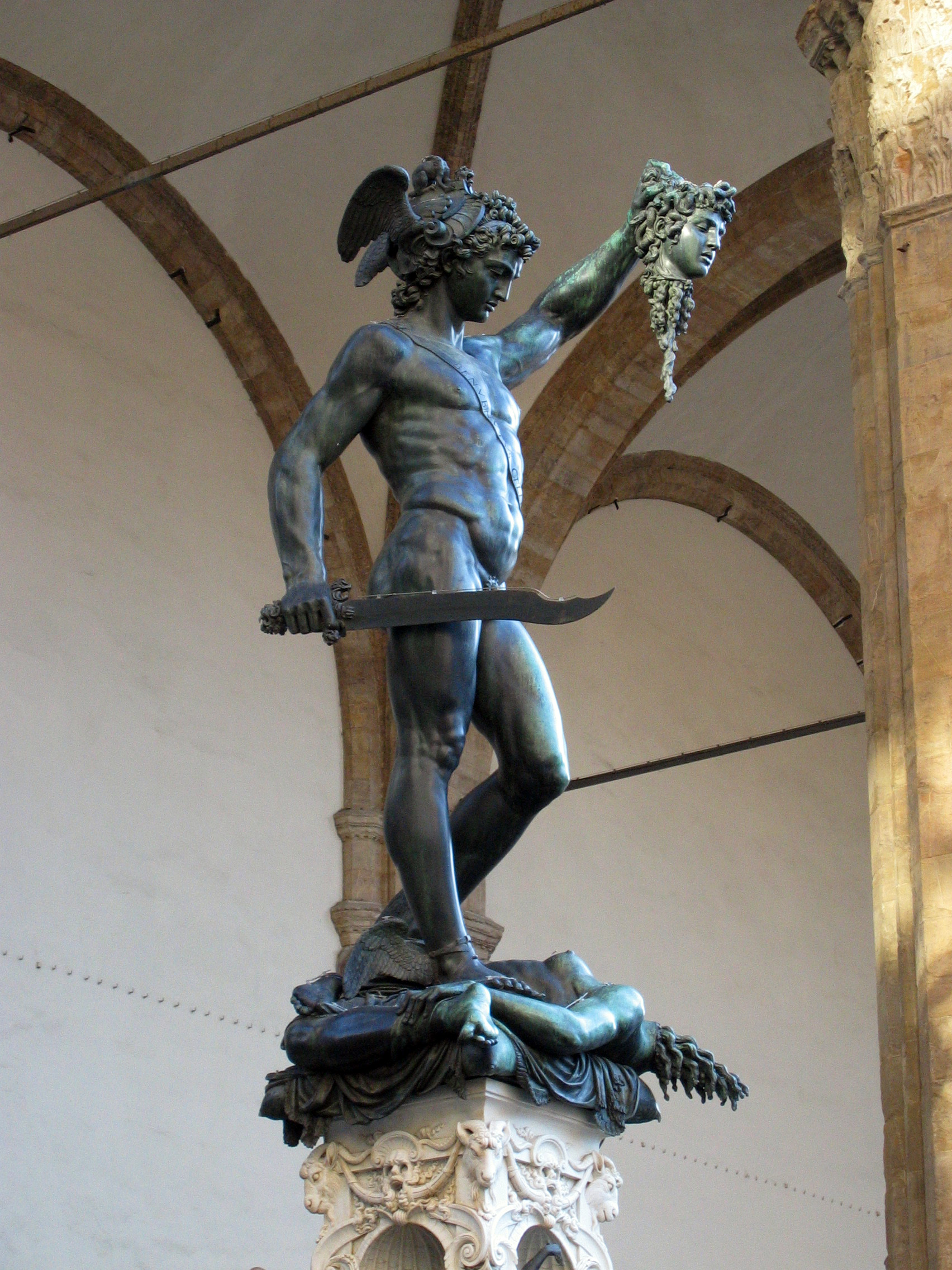
B.Cellinis Perseus with the Head of Medusa in the Loggia dei Lanzi gallery on the edge of the Piazza della Signoria in Florence; picture taken after the statue's cleaning and restoration.

The conservation and restoration of outdoor bronze artworks is an activity dedicated to the preservation, protection, and maintenance of bronze objects and artworks that are on view outside. When applied to cultural heritage this activity is generally undertaken by a conservator-restorer.

== Outdoor environmental issues ==
There are a plethora of influences that the environment can have on outdoor bronze sculpture, and unfortunately there are no two identical places. One method of conservation that works very well in one location may not work so well in another location. A conservator needs to take into account numerous factors when preparing to work on a sculpture. Some of these include the humidity, temperature, ultra-violet light, proximity to the sea, the amount of air pollution (especially if causing acid rain), and even what type of flora and fauna are in the area. If the sculpture is part of a working fountain, the quality of running water (hard, soft, alkaline, acidic, etc.) is important. How accessible the sculpture is to people and whether or not they would have the ability to climb on the sculpture is also an important factor.

According to Kipper, acid rain can be particularly harmful to bronze sculptures, because the main component is usually sulfides, or sulfuric acid, which can harm patinas and the bronze surfaces causing streaking to occur on the surface.

Many different effects can occur on a sculpture due to being in an outdoor environment. These include the formation of a black incrustation or a white powdery substance (mineral deposits) that has the potential to obscure the natural blue-green patina, or artificially applied patinas. Pollution-formed crusts could cause the metal to deteriorate and form small pits in the metal if not removed.

== Bronze fountains ==
Protective elements for bronze fountains are particularly important, since water is one of the leading causes for alterations or corrosion in a bronze. Bronze sculptures incorporated in fountains will need more layers of wax, because the spray of water will cause deterioration of the wax at a faster pace than would normally happen. Different aspects of the water need to be monitored, including but not limited to pH, total alkalinity, and hardness or level of dissolved mineral salts. There is a chance that the water will leave mineral deposits in a white/tan crust-like fashion. That "crust" can cause damage or become more permanent if it comes in contact with the metal surface or a patina and needs to be periodically removed. There are different chemical treatments that can be used to control the levels of these factors. Usually the maintenance of fountains has to occur at a more frequent rate than other bronze sculptures as well.

== Past conservation methods ==
In the late 19th century to early 20th century, one of the main ways to remove corrosion from archaeological bronze was through either chemical or electrolytic means. Sculptures may have had only spots treated, or may have been completely submerged. These electrochemical treatments resulted usually in the complete removal of any patina or surface material, returning the bronze to its original metal surface. Unfortunately this approach often had too severe of results, making the metal porous or leaving the surface with an unattractive appearance. This general method of treatment is still used today in some varieties, just perhaps not as severe as in the past.

Alternatively, one of these past "methods" of conserving bronze in the past was to simply not treat it at all. As to be expected, this had widely varying results—some archaeological bronzes survived in quite good condition, while others became so fragile they could crumble. Some bronzes are highly prized for their remaining original patinas, such as some of the ancient Chinese bronzes, so they purposefully do not do treatments on them.

One method, not all that different from treatments that are still performed now, is to dry the piece, carefully remove what corrosion is possible, and then seal the area or the whole bronze. Other treatments have included a wide variety of substances, from "esoteric or mundane substances that range from secret concoctions to materials as prosaic as oven cleaner or lemon juice".

== Contemporary conservation methods ==
16 minute documentary video from UK Parliament about the House of Commons project to conserve the Henry Moore sculpture Knife Edge Two Piece

=== Assessment of condition ===
Before any conservative action can be taken, an in-depth assessment of the sculpture or object needs to be taken. This includes, but is not limited to, looking at past conservation reports, the taking of current photographic documentation, assessing its current structural integrity, discussion with the artist/owner as to the depth of the conservation treatment desired, and testing of new or different treatments.

According to Virginia Naudé and Glenn Wharton, there are four steps that come with the assessment or survey of an outdoor sculpture, which they call an "Outdoor Sculpture Condition Survey":

1. Technical descriptions and condition assessments of each sculpture. Included are identification of materials, information on fabrication, assessments of past maintenance practices, determination of surface condition, and descriptions of structural integrity. Also important are comments about the effects of previous routine care, repairs, or treatment.
2. Maintenance recommendations for each sculpture. These recommendations are based on the history, condition, and location of the sculpture, the resources of the owner, and the relative needs of the sculpture in the context of the whole collection. The maintenance recommendation should include information on routine care and periodic treatment.
3. Assignment of priorities to recommended activities. The conservator assigns priorities based on the technical information gathered. These priorities will later be assessed in relation to art historical, fund-raising, and other priorities.
4. Estimate of resources required. The labor costs of the various maintenance options proposed are expressed either in monetary figures or in hours of work required for conservators, technicians, and other specialists. An estimate of hours is particularly useful if the recommended work will not take place immediately. Supplies and equipment costs are also included.

=== Cleaning and removal of corrosion and incrustation ===
==== By hand ====
One method of removing particularly tough incrustations off of a sculpture is by mechanical cleaning done by an individual. Such methods could include heating or potentially applying a solvent to a specific location to weaken the incrustation, followed by removal with a scalpel, spatula, or other such device.

Depending on the sculpture or object, delicate work could be done under magnification with a low-heat light. Some tools used in this scenario are: "glass-fiber brushes, painting brushes, dental picks, a pin held in a pin vice, wooden carving tools or sticks, and small camera bellows to blow away dust".

==== Water blasting ====
Another method of cleaning bronze sculpture, especially ones that are outside, is water blasting. Water can be pressurized at varying levels of psi, depending on what is needed for the individual case. Different types of nozzles can direct the flow of water in unique ways, providing a versatile cleaning method. This method works particularly well on surfaces that are pitted or have large amounts of surface detail.

==== Air abrasion ====
===== Glass bead peening =====
Glass beads were used for a decade in the industry for the cleaning and "stress-conditioning" of metal machinery that needed to be very precisely prepared. According to Phoebe Dent Weil,

The beads, typically 100 μm in diameter, are highly elastic, leave no residue, and produce a metallurgically clean surface without abrasion. Unwanted scale, accretions and corrosion products are shattered and knocked off by the force of the blast, and the metal surface is peened or worked on a microscopic scale. As a result of the micro-peening, microscopic cracks and pits are sealed improving corrosion resistance. Surface stresses in the metal are relieved and, as in the case of bronze, the metal surface is work-hardened producing a more compact crystalline structure in the metal surface and thereby prolonging the fatigue life and wearing qualities of the metal.

Dent Weil tested the peening process before use and found that on average less than 1 μm of metal was lost when applied to an area of 1 cm^{2} when blasted for 10 minutes. Because of the rate in which the incrustation was removed, they determined that this was negligible at best. They also felt that since they only actually needed to go over one section of the sculpture for a maximum of 3 seconds (a far cry from the 10-minute test) that this was the best method, as well as the fact that unlike sand-blasting no silica dust is produced and there is no fear of silicosis. One slight technical difficulty that has occurred with this method is in outdoor areas of high humidity the tubes have clogged up with the beads from the moisture. One solution that was proposed and carried out to solve this issue is the use of "wet peening". This process includes making a "slurry" of clean water and beads, increasing the moisture until it was no longer an issue and flowed smoothly through the tubes. Not only did this solve the problem, but it was found to have drastically reduced the amount of beads needed, as well as limit final cleanup of the area since the beads did not ricochet as far.

Contrary to Dent Weil's case, others have been against glass bead peening for several reasons. Nicholas F. Veloz, A. W. Ruff, and W. Thomas Chase performed a test to see whether or not glass bead peening really did not remove any metal from the sculpture and decreased the corrosion state as believed by many. Their findings were the opposite of these beliefs however, when they discovered that it does indeed remove metal from the surface at a higher level than would be acceptable. They also found that microscopically the surface of the bronze had been dented and pitted with little craters that had bits of metal that would flake off when colliding with one another and becoming brittle. Their subsequent tests also revealed that far from decreasing the rate of corrosion, glass bead peening may in fact increase the rate of atmospheric corrosion since it increases the surface area allowing for more areas to contain particles and water.

The end result is that while glass bead peening may be excellent for the immediate removal of incrustation and other matter, the long-term effect may be that it could harm the sculpture, and so should be used only with much consideration. An alternate to glass bead peening is using walnut shells, which Veloz and his associates tested in conjunction with the glass beads and is discussed in the next section.

===== Air abrasion with walnut shells =====
Using walnut shells as an air abrasive was developed as a gentler form of cleaning than sand-blasting or glass bead peening. Veloz found that a lower pressure of air is needed than the other varieties, though still a large quantity of air is required due to the finding that using a larger nozzle seemed to be more efficient (5/16-inch or 3/8-inch nozzle to be used with 35–40 pounds per square inch gauge). Smaller particles are more effective than larger ones (60/200 mesh, referring to particles passing through 60 wires per inch, but not 200 wires per inch). The best angle to hold the nozzle toward the sculpture is near perpendicular, but not quite—nearing closer 15 or 20 degrees away from exactly perpendicular.

Veloz and his associates, as afore mentioned, through multiple tests found that using walnut shells as an air abrasive caused no damaging effect to the surface of the bronze when viewed under the microscope, unlike the glass beads. This is true because the abrasive particles have a greater elasticity than the surface of the bronze, causing them to crumple and absorb the blow instead of the bronze being the one to give under the force. They also found that using walnut shells did not increase the rate of corrosion. Their conclusion was that walnut shells were the superior choice of air abrasive, because it had all of the same benefits as glass beads, but none of the negative side effects.

According to David A. Scott, Veloz, Ruff, and Chase's findings were also confirmed by "Barbour and Lie" who did a series of tests including glass beads, 3 different types of plastic beads, sodium bicarbonate in a powder form, and walnut shells.

== Tools and products ==
=== Coating materials ===
According to Naudé and Wharton, "Coating materials are selected for their durability, adhesion, ease of maintenance, and surface appearance. The selection of an appropriate coating system is governed by the bronze surface, environmental considerations, and expected degree of maintenance."

==== Wax ====
Clear Trewax Brand Paste Wax: Trewax brand paste wax is made of carnauba wax (the only other natural wax aside from beeswax) suspended in turpentine Trewax works well on both light and dark patinas, and is fast drying. However, if used on a warm surface it can smear or cause bulky build up ("mud pack").

Johnson Paste Wax: With Johnson brand paste wax there is a chance that it could cause a darkening of a lighter patina and should therefore be only used on darker patinas if that darkening is not desired.

Renaissance Wax: Renaissance wax is a hard wax that produces a high shine when it is buffed. It is not always the easiest brand to find.

Kiwi Neutral Shoe Polish: Kiwi Neutral Shoe Polish can create a "high gloss" if desired and can be used in conjunction with Trewax brand paste wax. It may darken light patinas, and so should only be used with medium to dark toned patinas.

Butcher's Wax: Butcher's wax is composed of paraffin and carnauba waxes as its main components.

Liberon Special Effects Waxes: Liberon has pre-toned waxes for when more than clear wax is necessary.

==== Sealants, lacquers and corrosion inhibitors ====
Incralac: Incralac was developed by the International Copper Research Association. It is made of a synthetic resin with what is often referred to as a corrosion inhibitor (benzotriazole) that is very durable in outdoor conditions. Benzoltriazole has also been referred to as a UV stabilizer rather than a corrosion inhibitor.

Cobratec 99: Cobratec 99 is manufactured by Sherwin Williams Chemical Company. Cobratec 99 is a commercial grade of benzotriazole. Care needs to be taken (protective gloves and masks should be worn) because it is toxic if ingested.

=== Brushes ===
A new 2–3 inches (5.1–7.6 cm) diameter soft bristled brush is a good choice for the application of wax. "Chip" brushes are easy to find in hardware stores, and are a good choice because of their natural bristles and relative inexpensiveness.

Soft bristled brushes (not metallic) are usually necessary for the initial cleaning of the sculpture.

Tape should be wrapped around the "ferrule" (the metal portion) on the brush so that it cannot come in direct contact with the bronze and cause scratching to occur.

=== Cotton cloths ===
Cotton cloths are used to buff the wax once it has been applied to the sculpture and it is fully dry. Using a type that produces low amounts of lint is best so it does not get stuck in the wax.

=== Cotton Gloves ===
Cotton gloves should be worn when dealing with delicate bronze or delicate patinas, so that the oil from fingers will not further damage the piece.

=== Soap ===
Detergents should be neutral or non-ionic for the preliminary washing of the sculpture. According to Judith M. Jacob and Glenn Wharton, "Detergents increase the wetting action of water, thereby increasing its ability to remove soiling materials. Non-ionic detergents are low in toxicity and can be easily rinsed from surfaces."

Non-ionic detergents:

Orvus

Igepal CA-630

Triton XL-80N

Chemique Ion-417
