= Remy Zero (album) =

Studio album by Remy Zero
- Released: January 30, 1996
- Genre: Alternative rock
- Length: 42:42
- Label: Geffen
- Producer: Remy Zero

Remy Zero chronology
Remy Zero (1996)	Villa Elaine (1998)

Singles from Remy Zero
- 1. "Temenos (Here Come the Shakes)"

Remy Zero is the debut studio album by Remy Zero. It was released on January 30, 1996. The band recorded it after moving to Los Angeles, where many of them suffered from homelessness and drug abuse. The album received very little attention despite Radiohead having added Remy Zero to their tour after hearing Remy Zero's original demos that appeared on KCRW, a radio station in Santa Monica.

== Critical reception ==
Professional ratings
Review scores
Source	Rating
AllMusic	3/5 stars

The Calgary Herald concluded that Remy Zero "fails to come fully together, drifting too often too aimlessly, not mapping clearly enough the Neil Young-Beatles-Wilco-bohemian backroads it travels."

== Track listing ==
No.	Title	Length
1.	"Temenos" (Here Come the Shakes)	3:30
2.	"Descent"	3:44
3.	"Water"	4:28
4.	"Gold Star Speaker"	5:08
5.	"Twister"	4:54
6.	"Chloroform Days"	3:23
7.	"Shadowcasting"	5:42
8.	"Queen of Venus"	2:31
9.	"Chromosome"	5:32
10.	"Christmas"	3:50
Total length:		42:42

== Credits ==
- High-hat – Stewart Copeland (track 7)
- Engineer [Mix] – Frankie Blue
- Mastered by – Bob Ludwig
- Mixed by – Remy Zero, Ronnie S. Champagne* (tracks: 6+8)
- Performer – Cedric Lemoyne, Cinjun Tate, Jeffrey Cain, Shelby Tate
- Additional musicians – Amiel Morris, Joe Ippolito, Joey Waronker, Louis Schefano, Martin Tillman, Steven Morris
- Producer – Remy Zero
- Recorded by – Eric Janko, Remy Zero, Ronnie S. Champagne
