= Dances for Harp and String Orchestra =

1904 work by Claude Debussy

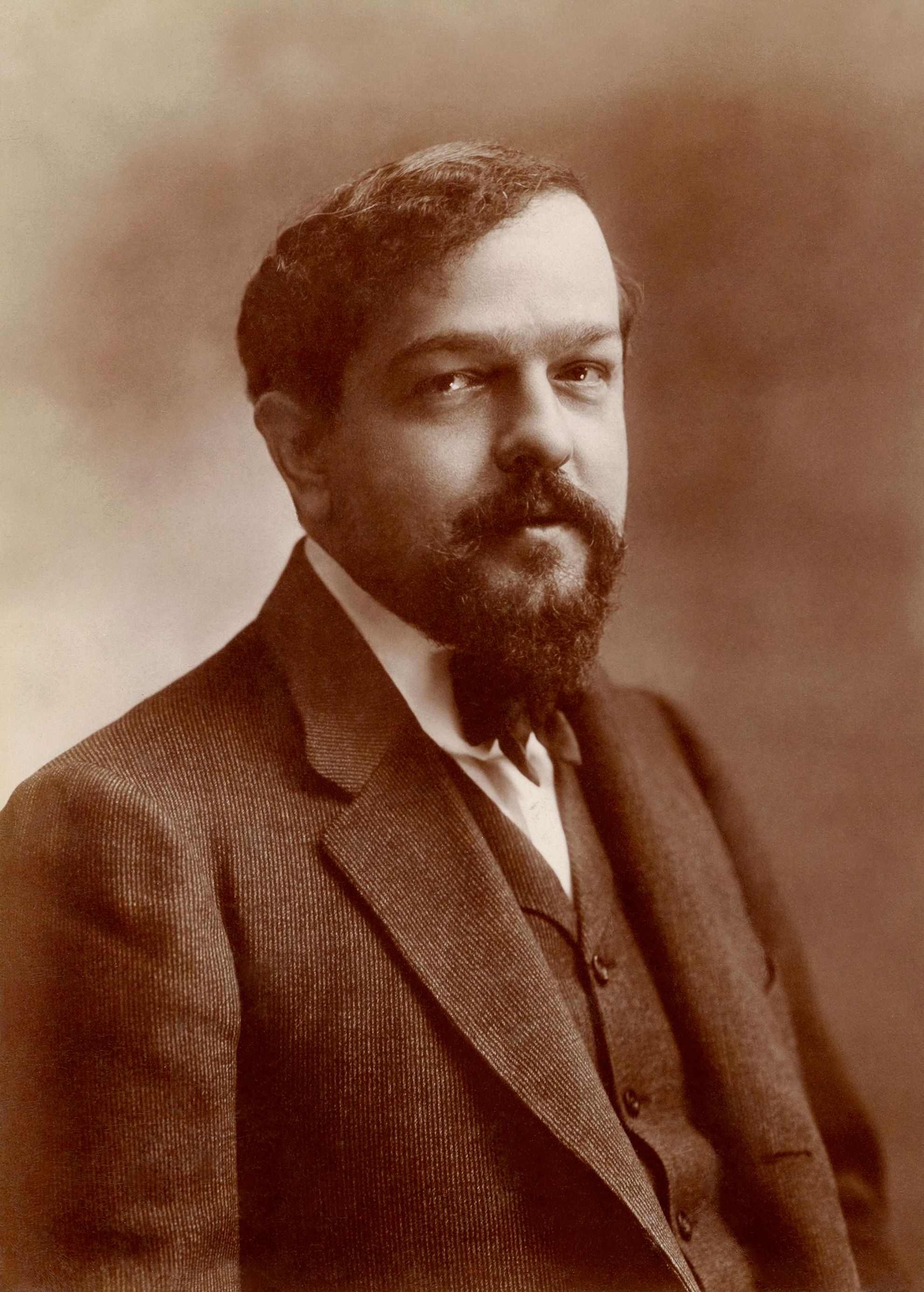
Debussy c. 1900

Dances for Harp and String Orchestra, in full in the original, Danses pour harpe chromatique avec accompagnement d'orchestre d'instruments à cordes (Dances for chromatic harp with string orchestra accompaniment), is a 1904 work by Claude Debussy. There are two sections: Danse sacrée and Danse profane, and the work is sometimes billed accordingly. It is a two-movement work, of about ten minutes' duration.

== Background ==
By 1904 Claude Debussy was established as one of France's leading composers. His 1902 opera Pelléas et Mélisande had brought him international fame, and he had been appointed a Chevalier of the Légion d'honneur the following year. Gustave Lyon, director of the Pleyel harp-making company, had invented a new type of instrument – the chromatic harp – with no pedals but with an additional set of strings, slanting across the others, enabling harpists to play any note in the chromatic scale with either hand. Lyon commissioned Debussy to write a work for the new instrument, originally for the competitions at the Brussels Conservatoire, where a class had been established for the study of the ancient harp in its modernised form. (Note: According to the musicologist Albert Birch in a study of the modern development of the harp, "the Danses are now [1969] commonly played on the pedal harp, and are in fact easier on this than on the chromatic harp for which they were conceived".)

== Premiere and reception ==
The work was premiered on 6 November 1904 at one of the Concerts Colonne at the Châtelet Theatre in Paris, with Lucile Wurmser-Delcourt as soloist. It had a mixed reception. Pierre Lalo, music critic for Le Temps, usually an admirer of Debussy, wrote, "It really seems as though the Dances are not by M. Debussy, but by some of his unfortunate imitators and one would like to be able to say as much, rather than being forced to recognise that M. Debussy is beginning to imitate himself". When the Dances were first heard in London, The Musical Times commented, "At least it can be said that they held the attention if they did not at once excite admiration". After the American premiere The New York Times described the Dances as "music of distinctive charm and flavor".

== Publication and later performances ==
The work was published in 1904 by Éditions Durand in Paris and Novello in London. Arrangements for other combinations of instruments followed; Durand published versions for piano and strings, piano duet, harp and piano, violin and piano, and cello and piano. The title of the original score was expanded by Durand to read "Danses pour harpe chromatique ou harpe à pédales, ou piano avec accompagnement d'orchestre d'instruments à cordes". The published work is dedicated to Lyon.

The work was first heard in Britain in June 1908 in the piano and orchestra version, with Julius Harrison as soloist and Granville Bantock conducting. The original version was given at the Bechstein Hall in February 1909 by the Société de Concerts Français. Wurmser-Delcourt was the soloist; in her American début, she again played the Danses, at a concert in Aeolian Hall, New York, in December 1919, but did not give the US premiere, which was in December 1916 in a concert at the same venue, when Carlos Salzedo was the soloist in the Dances and in the first American performance of Maurice Ravel's Introduction and Allegro.

== Music ==
Both dances are in D, the first principally in Dorian mode and the second principally in Lydian. The theme of the Danse sacrée appears to have been borrowed from that of the Danse du voile, by Debussy's friend Francisco de Lacerda.

The Danse sacrée is marked Très modéré, the metronome mark is ♩ =120 and the time is 3/2. The strings begin in the first seven bars and then the harp enters pianissimo, doux et soutenu. The Danse profane – marked modéré, ♩ =152, and 3/4 – is a slow swirling waltz, with its theme alternating with more animated interludes, before fading to a quiet conclusion. The two dances are of approximately equal duration, typically lasting about ten minutes between them. (Note: Some typical playing times from versions in the Recordings section: Chalifoux: 5m:8s and 4m:59s; Challan: 5:19 and 5:14; Langlamet: 4:27 and 4;57; Laskine: 4:27 and 4:32)

Debussy's biographer Léon Vallas, calling the music "simple and pleasantly harmonious", comments, "The use of the ancient modes, as well as certain details of the instrumentation, may possibly recall Erik Satie's Gymnopédies".

== Recordings ==
Recordings include:

Soloist	Orchestra	Conductor	Year
Edna Phillips	Philadelphia Orchestra	Leopold Stokowski	1931
Phia Berghout	Concertgebouw Orchestra	Eduard van Beinum	1952
Ann Mason Stockton	Concert Arts Ensemble	Felix Slatkin	1955
Nicanor Zabaleta	Berlin Radio Symphony Orchestra	Ferenc Fricsay	1956
Suzanne Cotelle	Lamoureux Orchestra	Igor Markevitch	1960
Lily Laskine	Paillard Chamber Orchestra	Jean-François Paillard	1962
Annie Challan	Orchestre de la Société des Concerts du Conservatoire	André Cluytens	1965
Marilyn Costello	Philadelphia Orchestra	Eugene Ormandy	1967
Alice Chalifoux	Cleveland Orchestra	Pierre Boulez	1970
Marie-Claire Jamet	Orchestre National de l'ORTF	Jean Martinon	1972
Vera Badings	Royal Concertgebouw Orchestra	Bernard Haitink	1978
Osian Ellis	Academy of St Martin-in-the-Fields	Neville Marriner	1984
Frances Tietov	Saint Louis Symphony Orchestra	Leonard Slatkin	1984
Lisa Wellbaum	Cleveland Orchestra	Pierre Boulez	2002
Ursula Eisert	South West German Radio Symphony Orchestra	Sylvain Cambreling	2004
Emmanuel Ceysson	Orchestre National de Lyon	Jun Märkl	2011
Catherine Beynon	Luxembourg Philharmonic Orchestra	Emmanuel Krivine	2011
Gulnara Mashurova	Singapore Symphony Orchestra	Lan Shui	2019
Marie-Pierre Langlamet	Berlin Philharmonic Orchestra	–	2019

== Notes, references and sources ==
=== Sources ===
- Birch, Albert (1969). "The Modern Development of the Harp". In Anthony Baines (ed.). Musical Instruments Throughout the Ages. London: Penguin. ISBN 978-0-14-020347-9.
- Debussy, Claude (1904). Danses. Paris: Durand. OCLC 21808571.
- Dietschy, Marcel (1990). A Portrait of Claude Debussy. Oxford: Clarendon Press. ISBN 978-0-19-315469-8.
- Vallas, Léon (1973) [1933]. Claude Debussy, His Life and Works. New York: Dover. ISBN 978-0-486-22916-4.
