= National Music Museum =

Musical instrument museum at the University of South Dakota, United States

Coordinates: 42°46′58″N 96°55′35″W

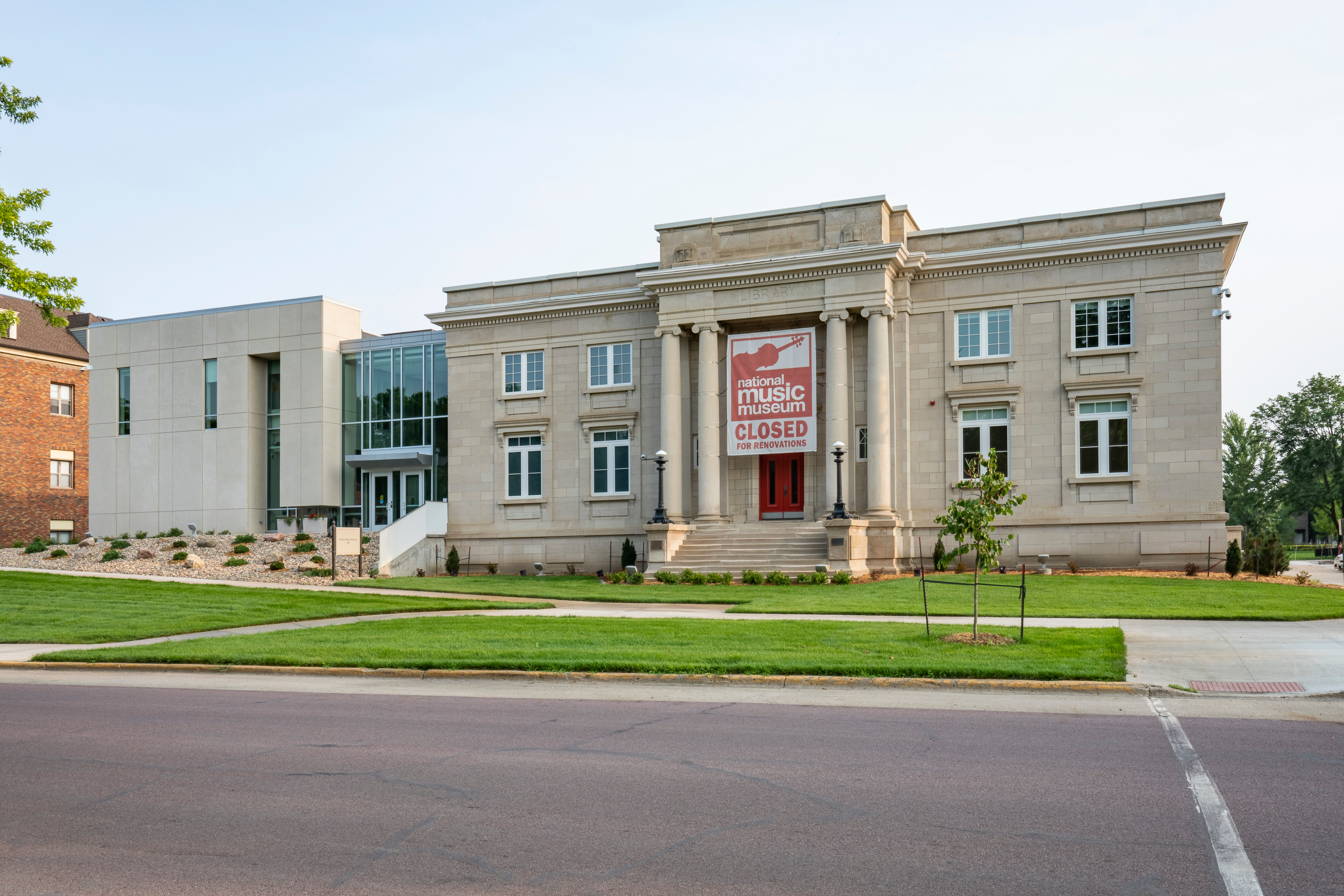
National Music Museum, Vermillion, South Dakota

The National Music Museum: America's Shrine to Music & Center for Study of the History of Musical Instruments (NMM) is a musical instrument museum in Vermillion, South Dakota, United States. It was founded in 1973 on the campus of the University of South Dakota. The NMM is recognized as "A Landmark of American Music" by the National Music Council and is a Smithsonian Affiliate.

The NMM's renowned collections, which include American, European, and non-Western instruments from a wide breadth cultures and historical periods, are among the world's most inclusive. They contain many of the earliest, best preserved, and historically most Western important instruments known to survive. The quality and scope of the NMM has earned it international recognition.

In August 2023, the museum re-opened its permanent exhibitions following a multi-year renovation and reinstallation. Alongside a modern addition to the historic Carnegie Library building, the new galleries offer over 16,000 square feet of displays showcasing the way musical instruments, across time and space, became a part of our lives.

The museum's current director is Dwight Vaught.

== Background ==
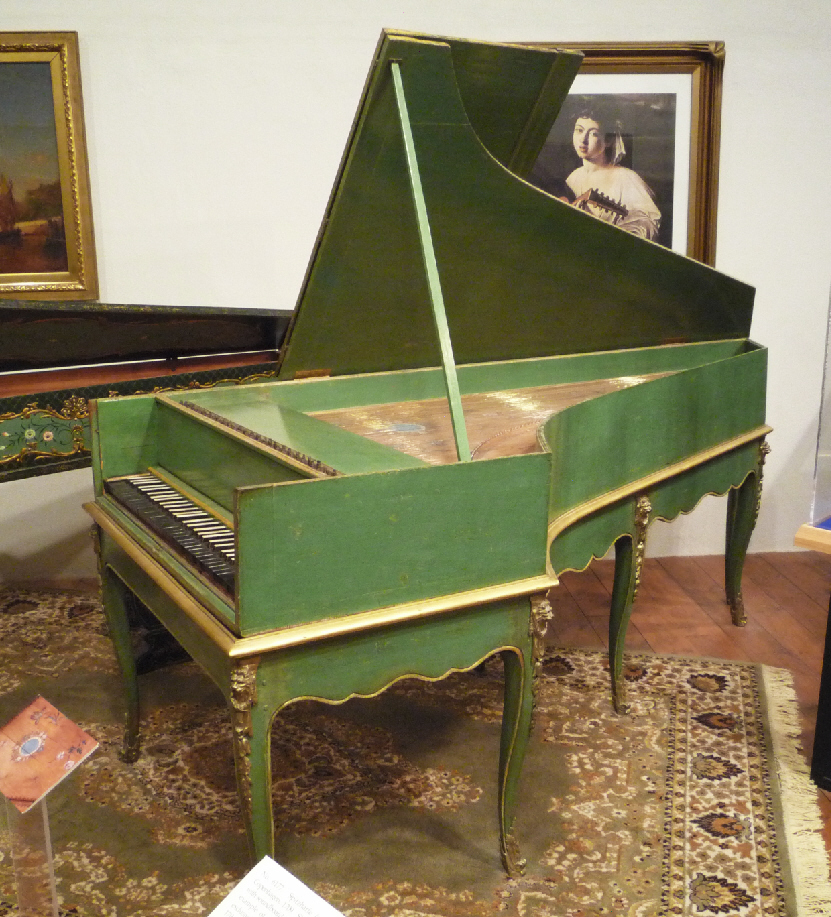
Grand piano by Louis Bas of Villeneuve-lès-Avignon, France, 1781. Earliest French grand piano known to survive; includes an inverted wrestplank and action derived from the work of Bartolomeo Cristofori (ca. 1700) with ornately decorated soundboard.

The NMM was founded as a partnership between the University of South Dakota, which provides staff and facilities for preservation, teaching, and research, and the Board of Trustees of the NMM, a non-profit, 501(c)(3) corporation that is responsible for acquisitions, public exhibiting, and programming. The NMM was established around the private musical-instrument collection, numbering approximately 2500 instruments, of Arne B. Larson. Larson's son, Dr. André P. Larson, was the founding director of the museum until his retirement in 2011.

The NMM is housed in a complex that incorporates an historic building (originally the university's library, built in 1910 with a grant from Andrew Carnegie's library building program) mated with a modern addition, which was opened in 2021. The Concert Hall has superb acoustics and provides a perfect setting for performing and recording music played on original instruments of various historical periods and cultural milieu. There is a specialized library, extensive study-storage areas, and a laboratory for the conservation and restoration of the instruments. There are violin-making tools and Baroque fittings, early harpsichord and fortepiano tuning hammers, and 1,000 brass instrument mouthpieces from virtually every turn-of-the-century manufacturer.

It also has rich holdings of related objects and archival materials, such as the unequaled Salabue-Fiorini-De Wit-Hermann-Witten-Rawlins Collection of 650 violin makers' labels. The American musical instrument manufacturers archives is the largest of its kind. Scholars from around the world make frequent use of the NMM's collections and facilities, providing an important opportunity for students to meet and work with individuals on the latest scholarship on musical research.

== Collection ==
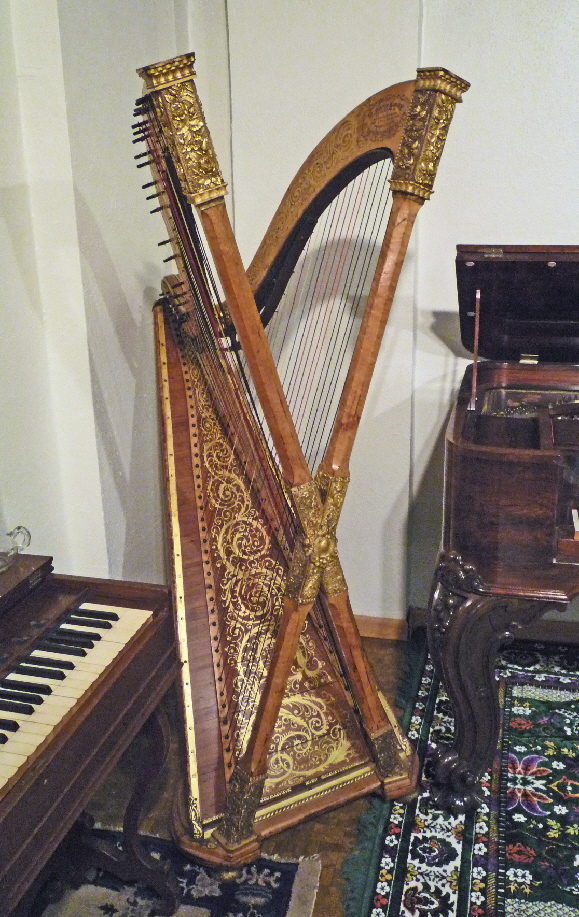
Double chromatic harp, built c. 1890 by Henry Greenway, Brooklyn, New York; one of two extant instruments of this type

The NMM is the only place in the world where one can find two 18th-century grand pianos with the specific type of action conceived by the piano's inventor, Bartolomeo Cristofori. One of these, built in 1767 by Manuel Antunes of Lisbon, is the earliest signed and dated piano by a maker native to Portugal; the other, built by Louis Bas in Villeneuve-lès-Avignon in 1781, is the earliest extant French grand piano.

Other extraordinary keyboards include a Neapolitan virginal (c. 1520), three 17th-century Flemish harpsichords (two by Andreas Ruckers), 17th- and 18th-century English, German, Portuguese, and French harpsichords, and German and Swedish clavichords.

A group of 500 instruments made in the late 19th and early 20th centuries by the C.G. Conn Company of Elkhart, Indiana, is a resource unparalleled anywhere for historical research about a major American industry and the American band movement.

The NMM's holdings by 17th- and 18th-century Nuremberg makers of wind instruments, including members of the Denner, Ehe, Haas, Oberlender, and Steinmetz families, as well as Ernst Busch, Paul Hainlein, Johann Benedikt Gahn, Johann Carl Kodisch, Leonhard Maussiel, Michael Nagel, and Paulus Schmidt, are unique outside of Germany.

The NMM's holdings of 17th- and 18th-century Dutch woodwind instruments by such makers as Richard Haka (represented here by a soprano recorder made c. 1690), Hendrik Richters, Philip Borkens, and Abraham van Aardenberg is unique outside of the Netherlands.

The Witten-Rawlins Collection of early Italian stringed instruments crafted by Andrea Guarneri, Antonio Stradivari, three generations of the Amati family, and others by far surpasses any in Italy. Included are two 17th-century Cremonese stringed instruments preserved in unaltered condition. Additionally, the NMM preserves one of four Stradivari guitars to be seen in a museum setting, and one of only two Stradivari mandolins known to survive.

The sum of these groups of American, Dutch, German, and Italian instruments is to be found nowhere else.

The 1994 addition of the John Powers Saxophone Collection (Aspen, Colorado) and the Cecil Leeson Saxophone Collection and Archives (transferred from Ball State University) make the NMM the preeminent center for studying the history of the saxophone.

The 1996 addition of the Rosario Mazzeo (Carmel, California) and the Bill Maynard (Massapequa, New York) Clarinet Collections make the NMM the preeminent center for studying the clarinet.

The 1999 addition of the Joe & Joella Utley (Spartanburg, South Carolina) Collection and the establishment of the Utley Institute for Brass Studies makes the NMM the preeminent center for studying the history of brass instruments.

The Alan Bates Harmonica Collection and Archives (Wilmington, Delaware), received as a gift in 2000, is second in size and importance only to the Harmonika Museum in Trossingen, Germany.

The 2005 gift of the D'Angelico, D'Aquisto, Gudelsky Workshop was the focus of a major exhibition, "Great American Guitars" (by D'Angelico, D'Aquisto, Fender, Gibson, Martin, and Stromberg-Voisinet).

In April 2007, the museum outbid New York's Metropolitan Museum of Art at a Christie's auction in acquiring a rare English cittern dating from the late 16th century, "This instrument is extremely rare, probably the only English cittern from the Renaissance known to survive," museum director André Larson said. "We already have an Italian cittern from the same period, but it's one of two or three that have survived."

== See also ==
- List of museums in South Dakota
- Music of South Dakota
- List of Carnegie libraries in South Dakota
- List of music museums
