= Reinhard Bentmann =

German art historian (1939–2015)

Reinhard Bentmann (2 April 1939, in Karlsruhe – 21 January 2025) was a German art historian and conservator, best known for his book on the architecture of villas titled Die Villa als Herrschaftsarchitektur (1970). He was a graduate of the Goethe University Frankfurt, the Ruprecht Karl University of Heidelberg, and LMU Munich.
