= Robert and Marjorie Rawlins =

Robert (Bob) Ernest Rawlins (December 3, 1911 – September 26, 1993) and Marjorie (Marge) Townsley Rawlins (February 6, 1920 – May 19, 2009) were American philanthropists and patrons of the arts, particularly music.

Robert was the son of Robert E. Rawlins of Pierre, South Dakota, schools superintendent (after whom the town's Rawlins Municipal Library is named). An Edison Scholar in 1929, Bob was expelled from an engineering course at South Dakota State College for spending too much time playing bridge. He spent some time working for the local highway department, before studying physics at the University of South Dakota (USD), Vermillion. There he met music student Marjorie Townsley, daughter of John Boyd Townsley, editor of the Dakota Republican. Graduating in 1940, Bob went to work for Lockheed in California, and when Marge graduated in 1942, she decided not to take up the offer of a scholarship to the Eastman School of Music, and married Bob.

At Lockheed, Bob rose through the ranks into management, finally heading their Electronic Systems Analysis and Development lab in Burbank. In 1956, he was hired by Hewlett Packard to run their new subsidiary, Dynac (soon renamed Dymec for legal reasons), and the couple moved to Palo Alto with their children Pam and Jeff. Bob was the first general manager, building the company up very rapidly from a small team in a single large room to a major business occupying several buildings. The core purpose of Dymec was to provide customized electronic measuring equipment, which necessitated considerable creativity, and Bob's name appears on a number of patents, including one for the backup transmitter for the first generation of US space satellites. In 1959, HP took the subsidiary into full ownership, and Bob left once the administrative transition was settled to take the post of Assistant to the President of HP, David Packard.

Marge, in addition to bringing up the children, became involved with several local singing ensembles. In 1966 she founded the University Women's Chorus (which she soon opened to non-graduates; for many years it has been called the Peninsula Women's Chorus), stressing the value of discipline and learning by insisting that performers worked from memory, even when singing in foreign languages. Both Marge and Bob, in their respective spheres, placed as much emphasis on enjoyment and sociability as on achievement, and the Chorus still maintains a tradition of parties each spring.

After leaving HP in 1962, Bob became a venture capitalist and scored numerous successes in the electronic technology industry. The couple shared a philosophy that the best status symbols were successes in which they had invested, and applied this even to ventures in which success was not measured by financial returns. When Marge learned of a new museum in her hometown, the Shrine to Music, which was opened at USD in 1975, she investigated it and became a life member. This led to a long succession of donations over many years, both for acquisitions and for improvements, such as the courtyard, with Mike Tuma's 1987 sculpture "Generations". Many of these donations were in the form of stocks in which Bob had invested, the most notable being the transfer of shares worth $3 million to buy the Witten collection of early stringed instruments in 1984. The following year, Bob put up $550,000 to buy the museum the Harrison Stradivarius violin, as a birthday tribute to Marge, and many other donations followed, the total approaching $6 million by 1991. Having now amassed the world's greatest collection, the Shrine has become the National Music Museum.

In the late 1970s, the Rawlins decided to return to Southern California to retire, and acquired the last unbuilt bayfront plot on Balboa Island, Newport Beach. Having lived for two decades in a modernist "Eichler" house, they chose architect John Lautner to realise Joseph Eichler's notion of "bringing the outside in" on a waterfront plot 30 feet wide and 70 feet deep, hemmed in by other houses. The result was a very individual, open-plan building of wood and concrete, with all of its curved seaward end filled by glass panels that could slide aside at the touch of a button. Initially resistant to Lautner's insistence on providing the two-story house with an elevator, they were later glad that this allowed them to spend the rest of their lives there.

After the move, Bob and Marge began to involve themselves with music and culture at the local University of California, Irvine (UCI), but they also gave much support to the University of South Dakota. In 1987 they arranged for the creation of a piano and string trio, the members of which were to teach within USD's music department; the founder members chose to call themselves the Rawlins Piano Trio. In 1991 they gave a record $1.7 million endowment to USD for scholarships to the valedictorians of 14 South Dakota high schools.

Bob died in September 1993. In 1995, Marge received both the UCI medal, and an honorary Doctorate of Humane Letters from USD (which has also established a group for intending legacy donors called The Robert and Marjorie Rawlins Society). The same year, she gave $1 million to UCI to endow music scholarships, then in 1996 she gave a further $1 million to create the first endowed Chair in the arts department, and established the Rawlins Fall Visiting Artist series over at USD- free annual masterclasses and recitals by world-renowned pianists. In 1998 she was awarded a Golden Baton by the Orange County Philharmonic Society, which she had also supported for many years (and in 1999 she co-sponsored the Society's exhibition of instruments from the Shrine to Music collection).

Marge co-sponsored research at UCI, published in 1999, which suggested that childhood music training is beneficial for the general development of higher brain functions. In 2004 the Rawlins Piano Trio at USD was complemented by the Townsley Graduate Piano Trio- annual awards of $5,000 for three graduate students, who are coached by their counterparts in the Rawlins Trio. Marjorie Rawlins died at home in the spring of 2009. She was survived by her children Pam Courtial (now deceased) and Jeff Rawlins, her daughter-in-law Cathy Rawlins, granddaughters Danica Rawlins, Becky Kerns and Christy Stocker, four great-granddaughters and her sister-in-law Jo Rawlins Gilbert.
