= Laurence Claiborne Witten II =

American book dealer and collector of antiquities (1926 - 1995)

Laurence C. Witten II (Larry Witten, April 3, 1926 – April 18, 1995), was an American rare book dealer and collector of antiquities.

Laurence Witten was born into a wealthy Virginia family with interests in the tobacco and furniture manufacturing businesses, but was raised in Cincinnati, Ohio, the son of life insurance agent Laurence Claiborne Witten I (1886-1937) & Julia (née McLaren), He enlisted in the army in the Second World War, and after the war studied music at Williams College, graduating in 1948. He then went on to gain a Bachelor of Music degree (BMus) at Yale in 1951. He then opened Laurence Witten Rare Books close to Yale's Sterling Library in New Haven, Connecticut, taking advantage of the dollar's strength to buy large quantities of early books and manuscripts in Europe. He married Cora Williams, a Yale student from Georgia, in 1954, the year she gained her BMus, and the first of their three daughters was born in 1955.

In many cases, European dealers were unable to give him much information about the items Witten was buying, but he took pride in the historical research necessary to overcome these problems, as can be seen in the twenty catalogues he produced between the 1950s and the 1980s. This dedication was most evident in his acquisition and sale of the Vinland Map, and its associated manuscripts, between 1957 and 1959. Even after he had sold them to fellow Yale alumnus Paul Mellon, he was able to give a great deal of assistance to the international team (led by his friend and frequent customer, Yale librarian Thomas Marston) assigned the job of authenticating the Map, both answering their questions and volunteering suggestions over a period of years.

Witten and his wife were both keen collectors. Among their interests were early stringed musical instruments and associated items, sound recordings capturing 19th century singing styles, pre-Columbian American art, and antique automobiles. After acquiring the very large vocal recording collection of George T. Keating (co-founder of the Memorial Library of Music at Stanford University) in 1960, the Wittens made their sound archive available to scholars by depositing it at Yale University Library in 1961, forming the nucleus of the Yale Collection of Historical Sound Recordings, since greatly augmented by them and others. Particularly in acquiring musical instruments, they were able to take advantage of sales by a number of European families during the 1960s, to assemble a world-ranked collection, focusing on instruments which had received the minimum of restoration (the collection once included a Stradivarius violin, but Witten decided it was too heavily restored).

In 1974, when scientific evidence emerged that the Vinland Map was a fake, Witten confessed that he had lied about key aspects of its provenance and acquisition. There were no serious repercussions, however, and he continued in his rare books business, though relocated shortly afterwards to Southport, CT. He also wrote a number of scholarly papers related to his collecting interests, published in academic journals, and was co-author of a catalogue of manuscripts donated to the Beinecke Library by Paul and Mary Mellon, published in 1977.

In 1983, Witten suffered a minor heart attack, which prompted him to offer the stringed instruments collection for sale in November of that year, at an asking price of $3 million. The Shrine to Music Museum at the University of South Dakota was keen to buy the collection, but before a funding appeal could be properly launched, the Berlin Musikinstrumentenmuseum made a preliminary offer of $2 million. Witten rejected this, and long-time Shrine sponsors Robert and Marjorie Rawlins, who had already agreed to contribute $1 million, provided the full $3 million to forestall any further foreign bids. The museum (later rechristened the National Music Museum) took possession of the collection on February 5, 1984, and named it the Witten-Rawlins Collection.

Becoming increasingly ill from about 1989, Witten retired from business in 1991. He and Cora moved to Florida, and gave away many items from their collections, including pre-Columbian art to the Michael C. Carlos Museum at Emory University in Cora's home-town, Atlanta, and manuscripts to the Beinecke Library. After Witten died in 1995, Cora gave a Nicola Bergonzi viola to the National Music Museum in his memory. The bulk of the pre-Columbian American art collection was auctioned by Sotheby's in 1996-7. Cora continued to support the development of the Historical Sound Recordings collection at Yale.
