= Peninsula Women's Chorus =

Choir in Palo Alto, California

The Peninsula Women's Chorus is a women's choir based at Palo Alto, California.

== History ==
In 1966, after a decade of involvement with local musical ensembles, Marjorie Rawlins of Palo Alto founded the American Association of University Women Midpeninsula Chorus, with 17 members. She soon recognized the limitations of working within the AAUW graduates' organization, and abandoned the affiliation; the choir was subsequently renamed the University Women’s Chorus. The principles established from the outset were that, although the choir was informal, its aims would be ambitious. In particular, members were expected to sing all pieces from memory, and the repertoire was to be ambitious, with many pieces sung in foreign languages.

When Mrs. Rawlins left in 1975, the members, by then increased to over 50, appointed 25-year-old Patricia (Patty) Hennings as their new director. Under her leadership the choir, soon rechristened the Peninsula Women's Chorus to emphasize its inclusive recruiting policy (though it maintained an association with Foothill College), continued to increase its standards, and in 1982 was selected by Stanford University for a project to record vocal scores written from memory in a Second World War prison camp on Sumatra by Margaret Dryburgh and Norah Chambers, as recorded in the TV documentary Song of Survival. The Chorus performed again in Europe in 1984.

Patricia Hennings, after suffering for several years from cancer, died in December 2001; for a short time her place was taken by Karen Robinson. Between 2003 and 2020 Argentinian-born Dr. Martín Benvenuto served as the Artistic Director until Dr. Anne K. Hege was appointed in 2021 after serving as an interim Artistic Director for 6 months.

PWC commissions new works, discovers rarely performed works, and keeps classical choral masterpieces for treble voices.

In 2008, the PWC was among the founding choirs of the New Music for Treble Voices (NMFTV) festival, which brings together diverse local and national choruses in the study and performance of innovative contemporary works. The PWC has assumed production of the festival in 2013 and in March 2023 the festival celebrates its 10th anniversary.

== Commissioned repertoire ==
The Peninsula Women's Chorus adopted a policy of commissioning new works to suit the Chorus, in addition to scouring the musical histories of cultures throughout the world. In both 1999 and 2003, the Chorus received ASCAP awards for adventurous programming- the first group to receive the award twice, and between 1987 and 2001, they performed three times for the national convention of the American Choral Directors' Association. The Chorus has released 9 CDs, two of which have won the American Prize in the Community Chorus Category.

== Grants, honors, and awards ==
- In 2016, the PWC was selected to perform on the primary stage at the ACDA Regional Conference in Pasadena, CA.
- In 2015, the PWC won first place for the American Prize, Community Chorus Category, based on the submission of their eighth CD Mostly Made in America.
- In 2015, the PWC was selected to participate in “San Juan Coral” International Choral Festival in Argentina.
- In 2011, the PWC won second place in the American Prize for Choral Performance for its 2010 CD Nature Pictures.
- In 2011, the PWC was selected to participate in the Seghizzi International Competition of Choral Singing in Gorizia, Italy.
- In 2009, PWC was awarded a grant from the Aaron Copland Fund for Music, which recognizes performing organizations "whose artistic excellence encourages and improves public knowledge and appreciation of serious contemporary American music."
- In 2006, the PWC was awarded third place in the Béla Bartók 22nd International Choir Competition and Folklore Festival, women's division. * Twice the PWC has received the prestigious ASCAP award for adventurous programming, most recently in June 2003, reflecting the excitement of performing challenging contemporary music from around the world.
- In 2003, the PWC was awarded American Society of Composers, Authors and Publishers (ASCAP) Award for Adventurous Programming in the category for choruses.

== Premieres by Peninsula Women's Chorus ==
World premieres, unless indicated otherwise.

- 2022
  - Would You Like to Have it All?, by Jennifer Wilsey
- 2021
  - Despertar, by Karen Siegel (consortium commission by the Peninsula Women’s Chorus, Consonare Choral Community, West Village Chorale, and the Yale Glee Club)
- 2019
  - Hands upon the Plow, by Jocelyn Hagen (Trailblazers Project)
  - Rise Up, by Jake Runestad (commissioned by the PWC through the ACDA Women’s Consortium)
  - When the Dust Settles, by Mari Esabel Valverde (jointly commissioned by the PWC and VOX Femina)
- 2018
  - Moon Goddess, by Jocelyn Hagen (commissioned by the Peninsula Women’s Chorus through the ACDA Women’s Consortium)
- 2017
  - Child of Impossibles, by Julia Adolphe (Trailblazers Projecr)
  - Come home little sister, by Cecilia McDowall
  - displacement I-V, by Eric Tuan (I. From Psalm, II. Overheard in Silicon Valley, III. Wayfaring Stranger, IV. Frosty night, V. San Francisco)
  - Harriet Tubman, by Walter Robinson, arranged by Kathleen McGuire
  - Patterns on the Snow, by Mari Esabel Valverde (commissioned by the PWC through the ACDA Women’s Consortium)
- 2016
  - A Blessing of Cranes, by Abbie Betinis (commissioned by the 2014 Women’s Choir Commission Consortium of the ACDA)
  - Flare, by Dale Trumbore (commissioned by the PWC through the ACDA Women’s Consortium)
  - Yellow Twig of Willow, by Stephen Smith (commissioned by the PWC through the ACDA Women’s Consortium)
- 2015
  - Oración del remanso, by Jorge Fandermole arranged by Eduardo Ferraudi
- 2014
  - Green Music, by Kirke Mechem
  - Heart Spells 1-3, by Mark Winges (Spell to Be Said upon Waking, Spell to Be Said Before Sleep, Spell for Inviting-in the New Soul)
- 2013
  - Songs of Night, by Kirstina Rasmussen (Night, Oportunidad, Ololiuhqui, Antigua Canción)
- 2012
  - Alma Submerged, by Frank Ferko
  - Ripple, by Ted Hearne
  - Song-Gatherings, by Eric Tuan (co-commissioned by the Peninsula Women’s Chorus with Piedmont East Bay Children’s Choir and Acalanes High School Bella Voce)
- 2011
  - Bright Mansions, arranged by K. Lee Scott (treble version commissioned by the PWC)
  - Face and Heart, by Pablo Ortiz (co-premiered with Volti, Piedmont East Bay Children's Choir, Cantabile Youth Singers, and Crystal Children's Choir)
- 2010
  - Little man in a hurry, by Eric Whitacre (co-premiered with Golden Gate Men’s Chorus)
  - The Jumblies, by Judith Shatin
  - Viento, by Leonardo Lebas
  - Three Buttons (known as "What's This?"), by Frank Ferko
- 2009
  - Martes, by Joseph Gregorio
- 2008
  - Nature, by Tal Peleg (student composer)
  - The Nickel Moon, by Laura Wise (student composer)
  - The Big, Shy Moon, by Miriam Helmy (student composer)
  - Wind Songs, by Karen Linford
- 2007
  - Acrostic, by Marta Lambertini
  - Looking at the Sea, by Chen Yi
  - Otherwise, by Brian Holmes
  - Thou Famished Grave, by Stacy Garrop
- 2006
  - Briefly it enters, and briefly speaks, by Brian Holmes
- 2004
  - The Snow Lay on the Ground, by David Conte
- 2003
  - Fanfare of Praise, by Sandra Milliken
- 2002
  - Jabberwocky, by Ron Jeffers
  - I Shall Keep Singing, by Brian Holmes
  - Benediction, by Ron Jeffers
  - Mila Begi, by Javier Busto
- 2000
  - Psalm 121, by Libby Larsen
  - Aphorisms, by Ron Jeffers
  - Dos Cantos, by Ron Jeffers
  - I Am Dice, by Ron Jeffers
  - Falling Rain, by Brian Holmes
  - Rabbit Skunk, by Brian Holmes
  - Wish Song, by Brian Holmes
  - This wonderful feeling, three compositions by Joan Szymko
  - Bright Love, by David Meckler
  - Take Up the Song, by Ron Jeffers (U.S. Premiere)
- 1999
  - When You Are Old, by Peter Tryggvi Bjerring
  - Oh Great Spirit, by Michael Cleveland
  - For Lou, by Rick Kvistad (written for Lou Harrison's 80th birthday)
  - Carols and Lullabies, Christmas in the Southwest, by Conrad Susa
- 1997
  - Christmas Intrada, by David Conte
- 1996
  - Two Songs of Love, by Michael Cleveland
  - Jesu dulcis memoria, by Michael Cleveland
- 1995
  - Requiem for the Earth, by Nancy Telfer
  - Indian Singing, by Ron Jeffers
- 1993
  - Miss Rumphius, by Victoria Ebel-Sabo
- 1991
  - In Praise of Music, by David Conte
- 1990
  - There is No Rose, by Brian Holmes
- 1989
  - Refuge, by Libby Larsen
  - Ballad of Befana, by Kirke Mechem
  - A Christmas Carol, by Kirke Mechem
- 1981
  - Shenandoah, arranged by James Erb
