= Auguste Wolff =

French pianist and piano maker

Auguste Désiré Bernard Wolff (3 May 1821 – 9 February 1887) was a French pianist and piano maker, from 1855 the head of Pleyel et Cie.

== Life ==
Wolff was born in Paris in 1821. Aged fourteen he entered the Paris Conservatoire, where he studied the piano with Pierre-Joseph-Guillaume Zimmerman, and took a first prize in 1839. He was also a pupil of Aimé Leborne for counterpoint, and Fromental Halévy for composition, and under these auspices composed several piano pieces, published by Richault. At 21 he joined the staff of the Conservatoire as répétiteur, and remained for five years.

After this he gave up teaching to become the pupil and partner of the piano maker Camille Pleyel, who, being old and infirm, was looking out for a dependable assistant. Wolff entered Pleyel et Cie in 1850, became a member in 1852, and, on the death of Pleyel in 1855, succeeded to the headship of the company.

He experimented with hammer placement to get the fullest tone and the best partials, and in the 1860s introduced overstringing to grand pianos. He patented several inventions, including a transposing keyboard and a pedal piano. His biographer in A Dictionary of Music and Musicians (1900) wrote: "It is owing to such labours as these, and M. Wolff's indefatigable activity, that the firm of Pleyel-Wolff still keeps its place in the front rank of pianoforte makers, and gains so many distinctions."

Wolff died in Paris on 9 February 1887; his son-in-law Gustave Lyon took over as head of the company.
