= Henry Greenway =

American engineer

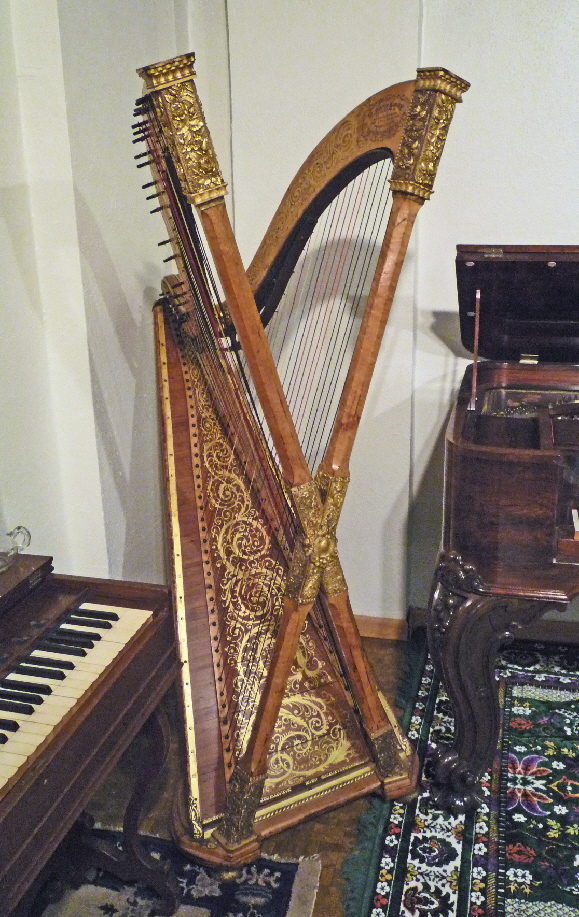
Double chromatic harp, built ca. 1890 by Henry Greenway; one of two extant instruments of this type, (photo: National Music Museum)

Henry Greenway (Birmingham, England, 1833 - St. Louis, Missouri, 1903) was an English-born American harp maker. He created a type of chromatic cross-strung harp displaying X-shaped double pilar and double neck. His workshop was at 545 Atlantic Street in Brooklyn, N.Y.

== See also ==
- Harp
- Cross-strung harp
- Electric harp
- Plucked string instrument
- Experimental musical instrument

== Bibliography ==
- Mandel Robert (2010), Classical & Romantic Instrument Marvels, Budapest: Kossuth Publishing.
- André P. Larson (Spring 1995), "Double Chromatic Harp by Henry Greenway", in: South Dakota Musician, Vol. 29, No. 3, p. 28.
- "1994 Acquisitions Include Rare Pianos, Harp, Woodwinds," in: The Shrine to Music Museum Newsletter, vol. 22, no. 2, p. 2.
- The Metropolitan Museum of Art (1989), A Checklist of American Musical Instruments, New York: The Metropolitan Museum of Art.
- Barbara Burn, ed. (1989), A Checklist of European & American Harps, revised ed., New York: The Metropolitan Museum of Art.
- Libin Laurence (1985), American Musical Instruments in The Metropolitan Museum of Art, New York: The Metropolitan Museum of Art.
- Libin Laurence (1979), A Checklist of European Harps: 1, New York: The Metropolitan Museum of Art.
- The Metropolitan Museum of Art (1904), Catalogue of the Crosby Brown Collection of Musical Instruments: Europe, vol. 1, New York: The Metropolitan Museum of Art.
