= Cross-strung harp =

Musical instrument

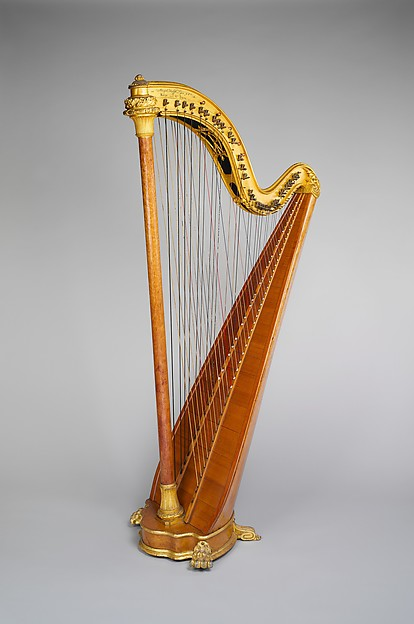
Cross-strung chromatic harp (Pleyel, Wolff, Lyon & Cie, early 20th century)

The cross-strung harp or chromatic double harp is a multi-course harp that has two rows of strings which intersect without touching. While accidentals are played on the pedal harp via the pedals and on the lever harp with levers, the cross-strung harp features two rows so that each of the twelve semitones of the chromatic scale has its own string.

== Spanish Renaissance ==
The first cross-strung harp is believed to have been created in the late 16th century in Spain and was known as the arpa de dos órdenes. Its identity as an instrument was established as soon as the early 17th century and it was used in both liturgical and secular music. Bartolomé Jovernardi has described a cross-strung harp as well as other instruments in his work Tratado de la música (1634) and invented a chromatic variety of this instrument. Its popularity reached its peak in the late 17th century, and declined thereafter into the early 18th century. The reasons for its decline are complex, including the cultural displacement of Spanish music and musical instruments at court (such as the arpa de dos órdenes and the vihuela) in favor of Italian and French music and instruments (violin, harpsichord, lute, etc.).

== French Romantic ==
The Pleyel & Wolff Company in Paris produced a cross-strung model based on pedal harp proportions in the late 19th century, to try to accommodate increasing chromaticism in orchestral music (a problem for orchestral harpists, because of the single-action pedal system still in use on orchestral harps). Designed by Gustave Lyon and known as the harpe chromatique, it had two sets of strings, one tuned to C major and the other tuned to F-sharp/G-flat pentatonic like a piano, enabling the harpist to play any note from either side of the neck. The two sets of strings crossed near the vertical midpoint of the strings, unlike those of the arpa de dos órdenes, which crossed close to the neck. This allowed both of the player's hands to reach both sets of strings at the point of greatest resonance.

Perhaps the most famous classical composition written for the harpe chromatique is Claude Debussy's Danses sacrée et profane for harp and strings, commissioned by Pleyel and published in 1904.

== Belgian chromatic harp ==
There was a chromatic harp developed in the late 19th century that found only a small number of proponents, and was mainly taught in Belgium.

== Henry Greenway ==
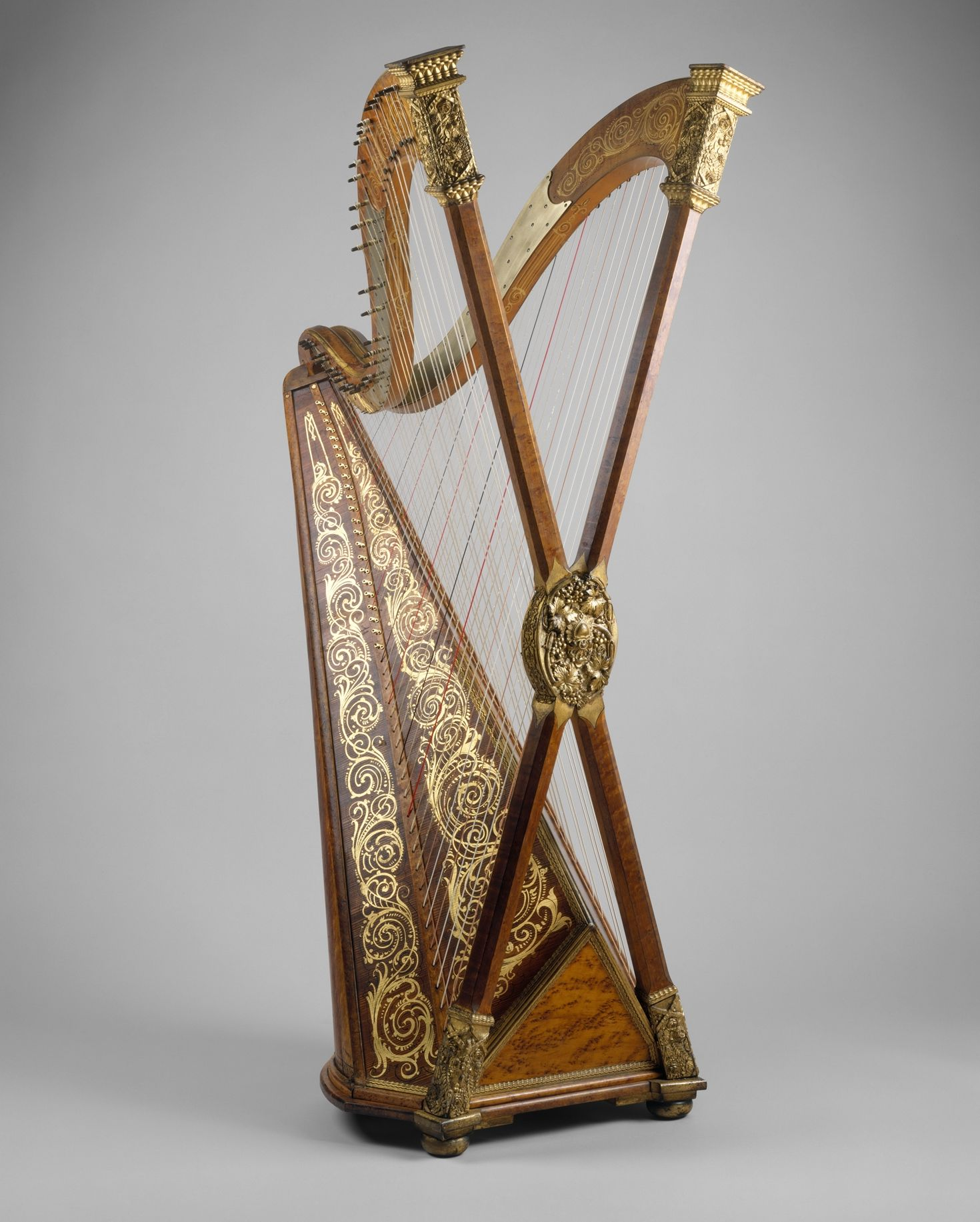
Cross-strung chromatic harp with two necks and X-shaped double pillar (Henry Greenway, after 1895)

Towards the end of the 19th century, the English-born American harp builder Henry Greenway built several copies of his peculiar cross-strung chromatic harp model featuring X-shaped pillar and two necks. One of them is displayed at the Metropolitan Museum in New York City and another at the National Music Museum, Vermillion, South Dakota.

== Contemporary ==
Contemporary cross-strung harps are being built with gut, nylon, or wire strings in a variety of sizes ranging from two to five or more octaves. Unlike the Spanish or French cross-strung harps, these are designed on a Celtic or folk model with smaller soundboxes, lighter string tension, and smaller size.

The largest resurgence or reinterpretation of the cross-strung harp began in California in 1987, when luthier and folk harp enthusiast Roland "Robbie" Robinson was presented with a cross-strung harp needing repairs. This harp is believed to have been made by Welsh luthier John Thomas as a student instrument for the harpe chromatique program at the Conservatoire Royal de Bruxelles. Robinson published a description and drawing of this instrument in the Folk Harp Journal. Emil Geering (now deceased), a retired machinist in British Columbia, began building cross-strung harps based on Robinson's rough plans. Ben Brown, a musician from Michigan, obtained one of Geering's harps and subsequently persuaded American luthiers Dan Speer and Pat O'Laughlin (retired) to build models of cross-strung harps. Harper Tasche, a Washington State musician, developed a five-octave model of cross-strung harp with Blessley Instruments in Vancouver, Washington, and subsequently recorded the world's first CD dedicated to the cross-strung harp in 1998.

The most common type of contemporary cross-strung harp is strung with nylon and built with a "7x5" string configuration: each octave contains the seven notes of a diatonic scale on one set of strings and the five "accidentals" per octave on the other. The layout is similar to that of a keyboard: each major scale has its own fingering pattern, and basic chords fall into pattern shapes or groupings. The advantage of this layout is that it provides a familiar concept (diatonic and accidentals) to the harpist and is easier to learn, owing to the presence of the diatonic "home row" of strings.

A less common string configuration is the "6x6" in which each set of strings is tuned to a whole-tone scale (rather than diatonic and 'accidental' tuning). The advantage of this layout is that only two sets of fingering patterns are required for major scales, one set when the root of the key is on the left strung strings and the other for the root on the right strung strings (though there is no advantage in fingering for chords, as the 5x7 and 6x6 configurations use the same number and types of pattern shapes to produce major, minor, augmented, and diminished triads). Another advantage is that a 6x6 harp can include a broader range than a 7x5 of similar size, since there are only six strings per octave in each row.

Unusual custom versions of the cross strung harp have been created by harp builders. Among these are a five-octave cross-strung harp fitted with steel strings (called the "lute harp") made by Gustave Lyon in 1899; the large X-shaped harps with two necks and two pillars, typified by the "Greenway" harp built in New York in 1889 (now in the Metropolitan Museum of Art's Crosby Brown Collection of Musical Instruments); the many innovations and variations in design by Gustave Lyon on the 'harpe chromatique' (including built-in tuning reeds, shutters on the soundbox operated by pedals, steel framing, etc.) from 1894 to 1930; pedal-activated damping rods for the lowest strings, and a "7x5x7" crossing double harp, by Philippe SRL Clément, late 1980s; a cross-strung harp with phosphor bronze wire strings by Argent Fox Musical Instruments in Indiana; and a hybrid 6x6 cross-strung which includes a sharpening lever on each string, built in 1992 by Glenn Hill of Mountain Glen Harps in Oregon.
