= Salle Pleyel =

Concert hall in Paris

Coordinates: 48°52′37.18″N 2°18′3.73″E

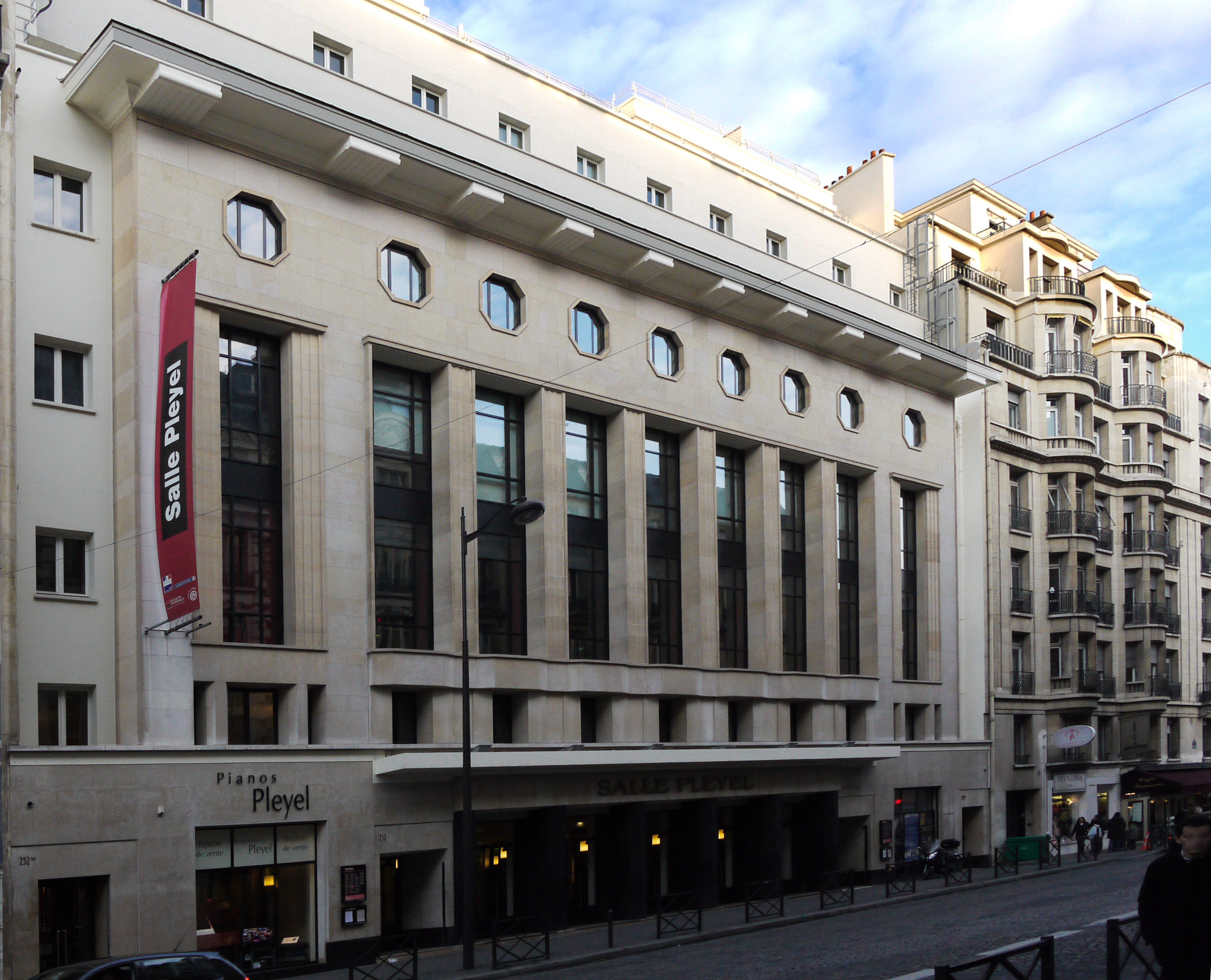
- Interactive map of Salle Pleyel
- Address: 252 rue du Faubourg Saint-Honoré; 75008 Paris; France
- Capacity: 2,000 seated + extra 500 with removable pit
- Type: Performing arts center
- Current use: Concert hall
- Public transit: Ternes; Charles de Gaulle – Étoile; Charles de Gaulle – Étoile; 30, 31, 43, 93

Construction
- Opened: 1927
- Architects: Gustave Lyon; Jacques Marcel Auburtin; André Granet; Jean-Baptiste Mathon

Website
- www.sallepleyel.com

The Salle Pleyel (French pronunciation: [sal plɛjɛl], meaning "Pleyel Hall") is a concert hall in the 8th arrondissement of Paris, France, designed by the acoustician Gustave Lyon together with the architect Jacques Marcel Auburtin, who died in 1926, and the work was completed in 1927 by his collaborators André Granet and Jean-Baptiste Mathon. Its varied programme includes contemporary and popular music. Until 2015, the hall was a major venue for classical orchestral music, with Orchestre de Paris and the Orchestre Philharmonique de Radio France as resident ensembles.

== Early history ==
An earlier salle Pleyel seating 300 opened in December 1839 at 22 rue Rochechouart. From 1849 to 1869, the impresario Charlotte Tardieu organized four chamber concerts a year at the hall. It saw the premieres of many important works, including Chopin's Ballade Op.38 and Scherzo Op.39 (26 April 1841), Ballade Op.47 (21 February 1842) and Barcarolle Op.60 (16 February 1848), the second (1868) and fifth (1896) piano concertos by Saint-Saëns, Fauré's Violin Sonata No. 1 (27 January 1877), and Ravel's Pavane pour une infante défunte and Jeux d'eau (5 April 1902) and Sonata for Violin and Cello (6 April 1922).

A replacement 3,000-seat hall was commissioned in the 1920s by the piano manufacturer Pleyel et Cie. The design work was divided in two: the main designer of the concert hall was Gustave Lyon, an acoustician, director of the Pleyel musical instrument factory and an inventor of several musical instruments. But he entrusted the architectural design to the architect Jacques Marcel Auburtin, who died in 1926, and the work was completed by two of his collaborators, André Granet and Jean-Baptiste Mathon. The building work began on 5 December 1924 on the land at No. 252 rue du Faubourg-Saint-Honoré, near Place de l'Etoile, and was completed in 1927.

The inauguration concert by the Orchestre de la Société des Concerts du Conservatoire, with Robert Casadesus as soloist and Igor Stravinsky, Maurice Ravel, and Philippe Gaubert as conductors, included music by Wagner, Manuel de Falla, Stravinsky, Paul Dukas, Debussy, and Ravel. A fire ravaged the interior of the hall on 28 June 1928 and the renovation cost made it impossible to repay the loan to Crédit Lyonnais bank, which eventually took over the property and reduced the seats to 2,400. They in turn sold the hall to Hubert Martigny in 1998.

Stravinsky returned to Paris to conduct the French premiere of Agon in 1957, and of Threni in 1958, both at the Salle Pleyel.

== Recent history ==
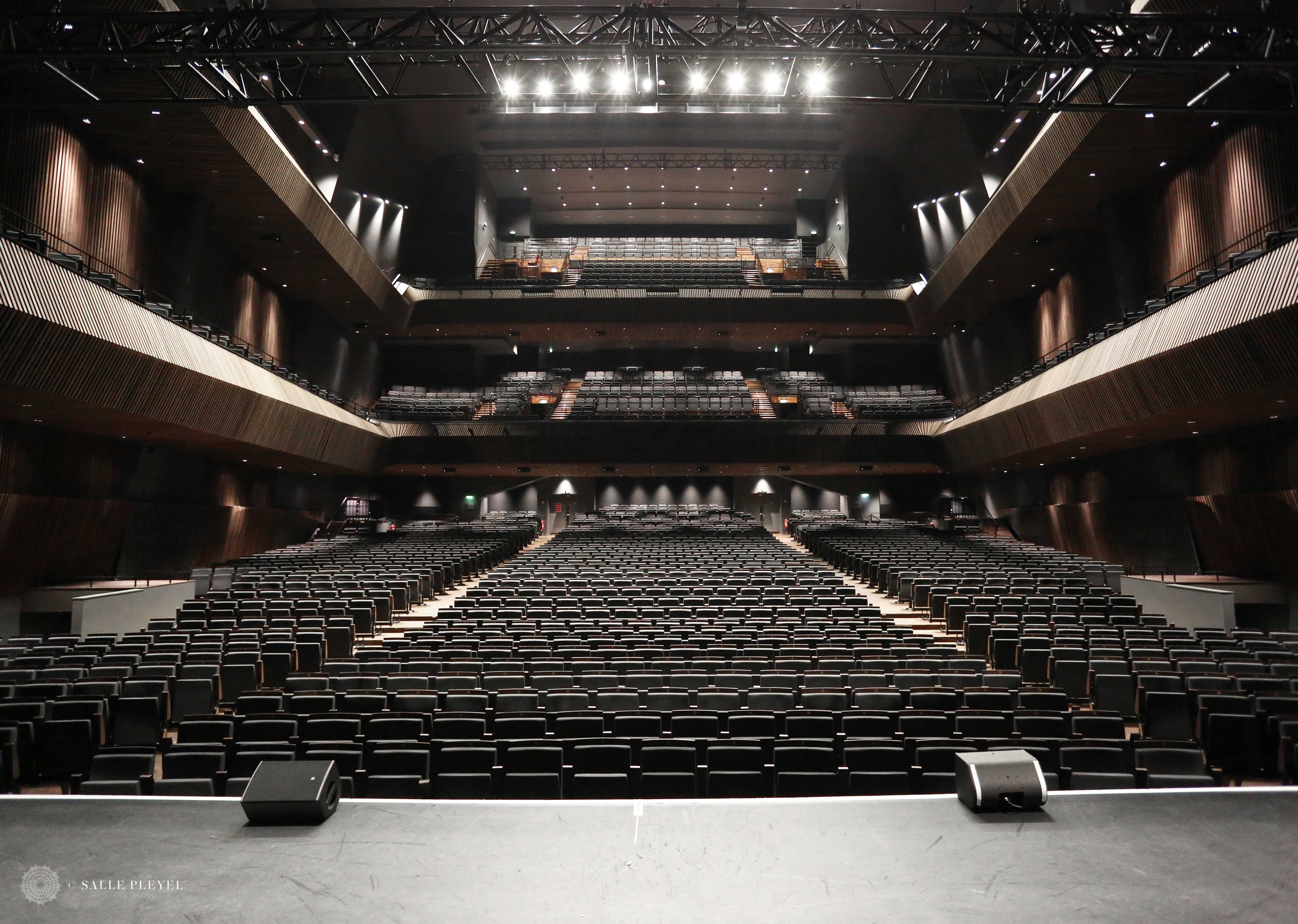
The hall's auditorium.

From 2002 to 2006, the hall underwent major renovation. The acoustics of the hall and the public and service areas were improved, and seating decreased from the post-fire 2,400 seats to 1,913.

The Salle Pleyel has been owned by the Cité de la Musique since 2009. Its status as a classical music venue effectively ended in January 2015, when its programming was transferred to the newly-opened Philharmonie de Paris concert hall.

An orchestral concert featuring live performances of music from various Bandai Namco Entertainment-produced video games, such as Dark Souls and Tekken, took place on 4 February 2017. The event was attended by Motoi Sakuraba and Go Shiina, composers of the aforementioned games.

== Design influence ==
In terms of influence, at the time of its completion, the concert hall was lauded for its acoustics by the leading modernist architect Le Corbusier. The interior form (tapered plan and curved ceiling) had an influence on the design of churches designed by the Finnish architect Alvar Aalto, firstly in his proposal for a church in Helsinki (1929, unbuilt) but also for a church he designed in Wolfsburg, Germany (built 1960).
