= Gustave Lyon =

French piano maker

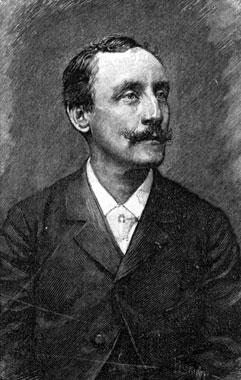

Gustave Lyon (19 November 1857 – 12 January 1936) was a French piano maker, acoustician and inventor. He was head of Pleyel et Cie from 1887.

== Life ==
Lyon was born in Paris in 1857, son of Jacob Lyon, a singing teacher, and his wife Fanny née Coche. He was educated at the Lycée Saint-Louis and at the École polytechnique; he received a degree in civil engineering from the École des mines de Paris in 1882.

Auguste Wolff, director of the piano maker Pleyel et Cie, offered him a place in the company. Lyon later married Wolff's daughter Marie, and he took over as head of the company on Wolff's death in 1887.

He filed a number of inventions for new kinds of piano, such as a double pianos and a two-keyboard piano; and other instruments, such as a chromatic harp and chromatic timpani.

In the First World War, although not obliged to take part, Lyon was commander of artillery on the east coast of the Cotentin Peninsula; later, as deputy to the director of land artillery, he organised the defence of Cherbourg against aircraft. During this time he invented instruments for locating aircraft, and studied ballistics.

He was interested in acoustics: his improvements to the acoustics of the Palais du Trocadéro (1903–1911) established his reputation in the field after the war. He was one of the designers of the Salle Pleyel. He improved existing concert halls and advised the architects of new buildings; he was an adviser to Le Corbusier. He also helped to preserve important buildings which had been condemned for their poor acoustics.

Lyon was made Commander of the Legion of Honour in 1928. He died in Paris in 1936.
