= Conservator-restorer =

Professional responsible for the preservation of artistic and cultural artifacts

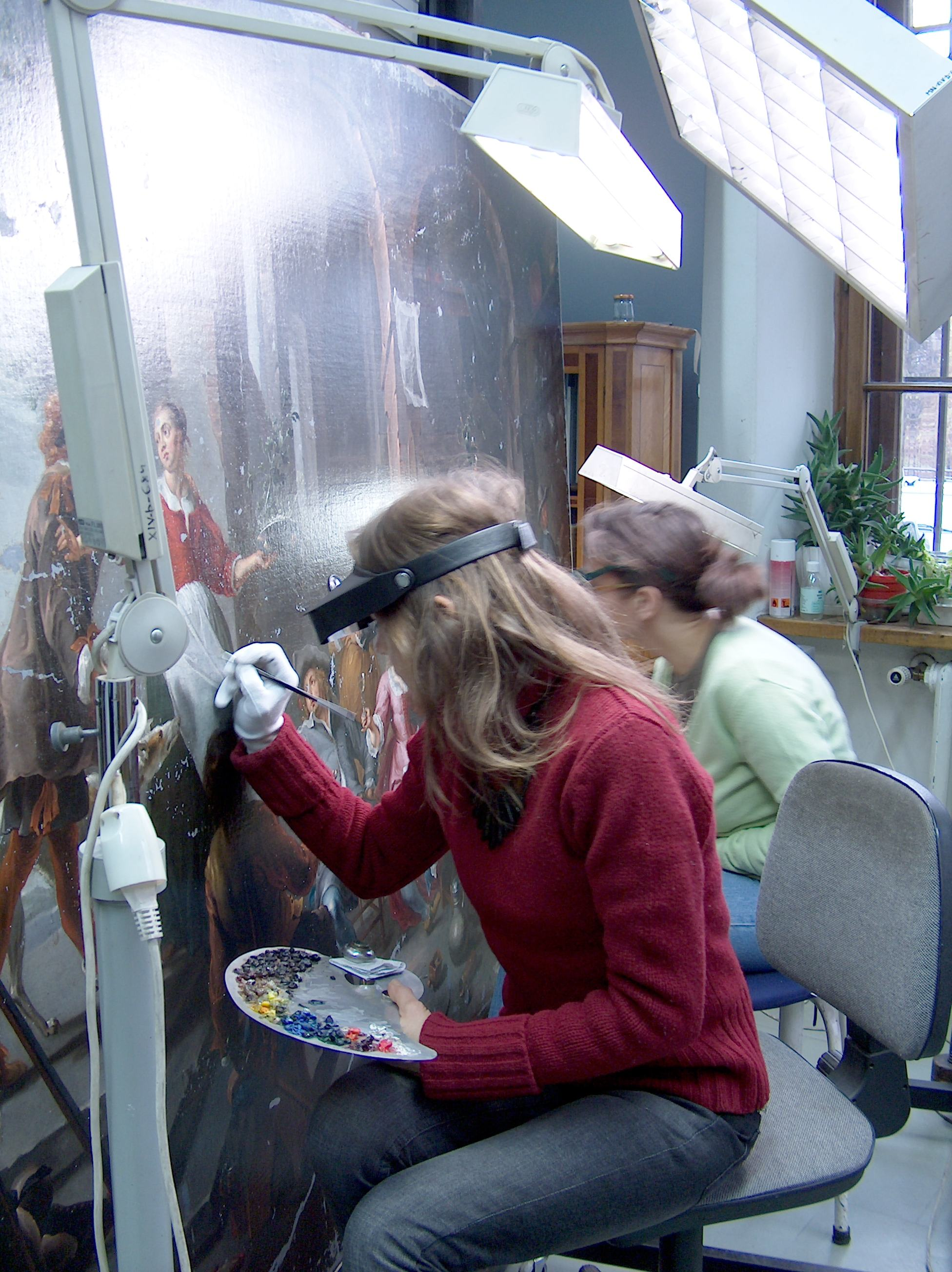
Paintings restoration

A conservator-restorer is a professional responsible for the preservation of artistic and cultural artifacts, also known as cultural heritage. Conservators possess the expertise to preserve cultural heritage in a way that retains the integrity of the object, building or site, including its historical significance, context and aesthetic or visual aspects. This kind of preservation is done by analyzing and assessing the condition of cultural property, understanding processes and evidence of deterioration, planning collections care or site management strategies that prevent damage, carrying out conservation treatments, and conducting research. A conservator's job is to ensure that the objects in a museum's collection are kept in the best possible condition, as well as to serve the museum's mission to bring art before the public.

== Conservation and restoration ==
Essentially, the term "conservation" refers to a manner of care or treatment that repairs damage and also takes action to prevent or slow down further deterioration of an object. The term "restoration" refers to a manner of care or treatment in which the goal is to bring an object back to its original appearance or function. "Restoration" can be part of the care and treatment of an object and is a subset of the umbrella term "conservation". Both terms come into play when it comes to the treatment and care of all cultural heritage.

== Responsibilities and duties ==
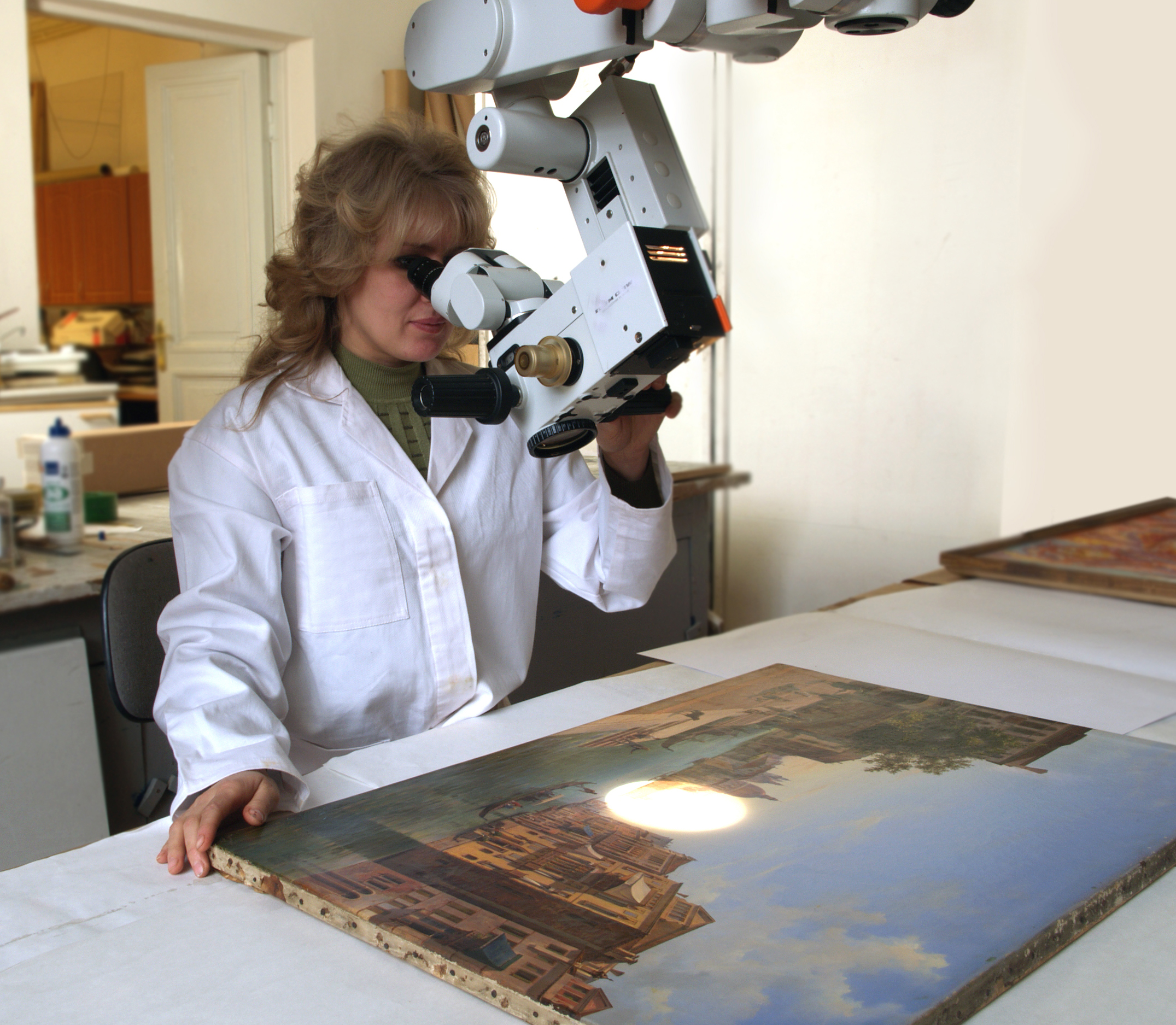
Use of a microscope to examine the condition of an artwork

Conservators and restorers care for, manage, treat, preserve, and document many different historical items including artifacts, art, and specimens.

- Examining artifacts, both visually and using scientific tools such as x-rays, infrared photography and microscopic analysis to determine the extent and causes of deterioration. Conservation science (sometimes called museum science) aids every aspect of a museum's mission to study its collections, both inside and out of the laboratory.
- Maintaining full conservation records by documenting the condition of an object or site, including any previous restoration work and to outline treatment methods and materials in detail. Documentation ensures the careful recording of treatment procedures and materials so there can be no misunderstanding in the future about what is part of the original work of art and what has been added or altered by the conservator
- Producing a visual record of the object for identification purposes and to illustrate its condition. The examination of the object, treatment proposal, and the actual treatment is documented with written reports and photographs
- Monitoring and recording display and storage conditions with the aim of keeping objects in a stable condition. Preservation is the ultimate goal of conservation. By taking into account the possible day-to-day stresses caused by an object's environment, museum conservators do their best to preserve art for generations to come.
- Proposing and estimating the costs of treatments to halt decay and stabilize an artifact. Conservators, present a proposal for work to be done as well as a report on the completion of the treatment.
- Restoration to bring a deteriorated or damaged object or structure closer to a previous or assumed appearance or function. Although conservators cannot exactly recapture the original appearance, they are able to make highly educated decisions about how to restore an object if they identify the materials from which it was made and fully understand their properties.
- Organizing the logistics of long-term projects and collaborating with other conservators. This collaboration can take place when items are on loan or when outside help is needed for complex conservation projects.
- Working out creative solutions to clean, support and repair sensitive objects. Ultimately, just as every object is unique, every conservation decision must be considered on its own and on a case-by-case basis.
- Developing and maintaining appropriate standards within the specialist area. Critical information can be lost and an object permanently damaged when things are cared for without basic guidelines and information.
- Keeping up to date with the latest conservation techniques and practices, through research and training. Conservation is a young profession, which means it continues to evolve over time and conservators must be able to keep up to date with the latest trends.
- Advising on procedures for the safe exhibition and travel of cultural materials . Museum conservators strive to maintain the integrity of each work of art throughout its life, whenever it is handled, stored, displayed, or shipped to other locations for exhibitions.
- Direct and supervise curatorial, technical, and student staff in the handling, mounting, care, and storage of art objects. Other museum departments look to conservators and restorers for direction on safety procedures when it comes to objects in the museum's collection.
- Recommend preservation procedures, such as control of temperature and humidity, to curatorial and building staff. The most important step you can take to ensure the preservation of any collection is to create a safe display and storage environment that will not cause further deterioration of the objects.

== Knowledge and skills ==
- Working knowledge of the vocabulary of conservation and scientific methodology in order to effectively examine an object, assess its state, understand its history, and articulate its needs.
- Must have a firm grasp of philosophical precepts expressed in the AIC Code of Ethics and Guidelines for Practice (in the United States) in order to formulate a treatment. The conservator must understand that it's important to respect the integrity of the object and that their actions should not jeopardize the long-term preservation of the object.
- Understanding and appreciation of the aesthetic, cultural, economic, historical, political, religious, scientific, and social values of objects, buildings and sites. This understanding and appreciation are critically important when devising preservation and conservation plans, strategies, and treatments.
- Working knowledge of how materials constituting cultural heritage were acquired, modified, processed, or manufactured and how craft or manufacturing techniques and processes have evolved through time.
- Possess knowledge of the chemical and physical properties and long-term behavior of a wide range of materials and whether these materials were used in the original fabrication of an object or in its subsequent treatment and preservation.
- Must be aware of issues that arise from the ways that culturally significant materials will be accessed or used by society.
- Knowledge of the context in which cultural heritage is used, as context may be critically important to understanding its condition, formulating appropriate treatment and recommending future care.
- Knowledgeable about safety in the workplace and must carry out their practice in compliance with federal, state, and logical regulations.
- Working knowledge of scientific principles as they apply to conservation, including how to access and use scientific literature and how to assess the validity of published research in conservation and allied fields.
- Ability to recognize and understand the changes that occur in cultural heritage over time and be able to distinguish the cause of the changes (natural, chemical, physical, biological, or by human influence).
- Versed in the many ways in which light, relative humidity, temperature, and pollutants can influence the long-term preservation of cultural heritage and must be familiar with techniques, equipment, and resources that can assist in managing these important environmental factors.
- Ability to conduct a safe, thorough examination of cultural materials in order to gather relevant information about their condition and to formulate an appropriate plan for preservation and treatment.
- Know which tools and techniques are appropriate, how extensive the examination should be, and how or whether to perform external, intrusive, and occasionally destructive sampling.
- Understand the purposes of documentation and must be knowledgeable and proficient in appropriate methods of written and pictorial documentation as well as in the maintenance and preservation of the body of information produced during examination and treatment.
- Awareness of various treatment methods available as well as their effects on different types of cultural heritage, based on an understanding of condition, natural use, cultural, historic, and scientific significance, and, if applicable, the artist's or maker's intent.

== Education and training ==
=== Undergraduate and graduate education ===
Conservators can receive training through apprenticeships, internships and graduate programs. In order to be accepted into a graduate program in the United States, they will need to fulfill some undergraduate prerequisites. This includes undergraduate coursework in science, the humanities (art history, anthropology, and archaeology), and studio art. Some graduate programs may also require internship, volunteer, apprenticeship, or paid conservation experience. Many may also require a personal interview where candidates are asked to present a portfolio of art and conservation project work that demonstrates manual dexterity and familiarity with techniques and materials. Graduate programs generally require two to four years of study, which can also include a full-time internship in the final year where students work under the guidance of experienced conservators. There are also a limited number of Ph.D. programs for advanced study in conservation. Conservation-related programs are described on the websites of the AIC, the National Council for Preservation Education (NCPE), and the Society of American Archivists (SAA).

=== Post-graduate fellowships ===
Post-graduate fellowships have also been cited as valuable experiences in their professional development. These fellowships provide intensive research, practice, and exposure to diverse professional staff or significant collections. A few institutions that offer fellowships include the Getty Foundation, the Smithsonian's Museum Conservation Institute, and the Straus Center of Harvard Art Museums.

=== Continued professional development ===
The specialty of conservation is ever-changing and evolving, which means that practicing conservators must stay up-to-date of advances in technology and methodology. Conservators usually expand their knowledge through reading publications, attending professional meetings, and enrolling in short-term workshops or courses. AIC offers many workshops, conferences, and online courses and tutorials. Conservation OnLine (CoOL) also offers resources for conservation professionals.

== Areas of specialty ==
Some conservators specialize in a particular material or group of objects, such as archaeology, ceramics and glass, furniture and wood, gilding and decorative surfaces, historic interiors, metals, paintings, paper and books, photographic materials, stained glass, stone and wall paintings, textiles, sculptures, architecture, time-based art and new media.

- Archaeological conservation
- Architectural conservation
- Books, manuscripts, and documentation conservation
- Ceramic conservation
- Glass conservation
- Historic garden conservation
- Historic Site conservation
- Ivory conservation
- Metal conservation
- Musical instrument conservation
- Painting conservation
- Photograph conservation
- Textile conservation
- Wooden furniture conservation
- Time-Based Media conservation
- New Media conservation

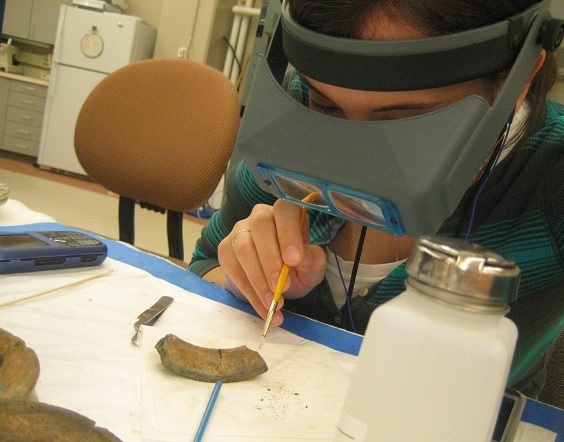
Ceramics conservation

== Ethics ==
The primary goal for conservators and restorers is the preservation of cultural property. In order to achieve this goal, conservators abide by a code of ethics and guidelines that establish the principles that guide conservation professionals and others who are involved in the care of cultural property. An example of a code of ethics and guidelines for practice were created by the American Institute for Conservation of Historic and Artistic Works (AIC). One of the most important principles in a conservator's code of ethics is that treatments should be reversible, which means that one must be able to undo any treatment in the future. Conservators strive to only minimize interventions and not completely alter an object during restoration. Conservation focuses on the material aspects of art, and respect for original materials remains a crucial element of the field's ethics.

== Professional organizations ==
- American Institute for Conservation (AIC)
- Art Conservation
- Australian Institute for the Conservation of Cultural Material (AICCM)
- International Council of Museums – Committee for Conservation (ICOM-CC)
- International Institute for Conservation of Historic and Artistic Works (ICC)
- Canadian Conservation Institute
- Canadian Association for Conservation (CAC)
- Institute of Conservation (UK)
