= Conservation and restoration of musical instruments =

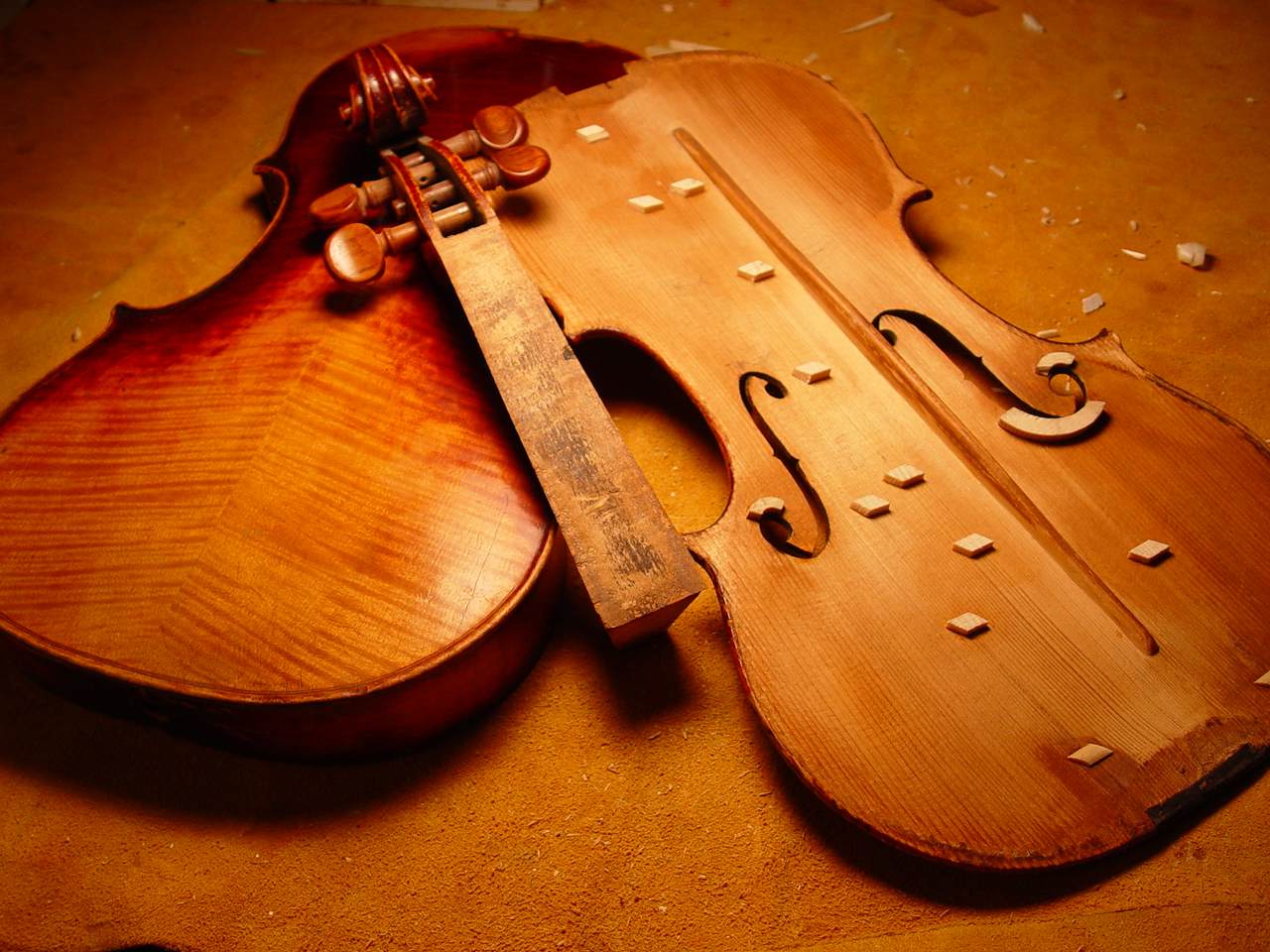
A violin in the process of being restored

The conservation and restoration of musical instruments is performed by conservator-restorers who are professionals, properly trained to preserve or protect historical and current musical instruments from past or future damage or deterioration. Because musical instruments can be made entirely of, or simply contain, a wide variety of materials such as plastics, woods, metals, silks, and skin, to name a few, a conservator should be well-trained in how to properly examine the many types of construction materials used in order to provide the highest level or preventive and restorative conservation.

The conservation and restoration of musical instruments presents an issue that is unlike any faced elsewhere in the art world. Unlike paintings, sculptures and photographs, musical instruments are functional objects that cannot be fully appreciated through their visual aspects alone – much of their artistic value comes from the sound that they are able to produce. It is because of this that before beginning any treatments, determination should be made as to whether the piece will be available for display only or if there is intention to be able to perform with the instrument, as making an instrument available for performance may require the replacement of original pieces such as strings and drumheads, thus raising ethical issues relating to how much of the original object should be replaced and to what end.

== Background ==
Musical instrument conservation, at least by the date of the earliest reference acquired, originates from 1862 when "a letter was written by Antonio Stradivari, who not only repaired his own instruments but also those of other makers, for Count Cesare Castelbarco about how to conserve his many Stradivari instruments."

There are many similarities between musical instrument conservation and art work protection. Like a conservator working to restore the color saturation of the water lilies in a Claude Monet painting, conservators should keep in mind the instrument maker's integrity when cleaning or restoring any type of musical instrument (for example, luthiers create guitars and violins for guitarists or violinists), as well as the standardized policies or ethics of art conservation. According to the Code of Ethics, "II. All actions of the conservation professional must be governed by an informed respect for the cultural property, its unique character and significance, and the people or person who created it." Both art conservation and musical instrument conservation require a lot of attention to detail, patience, and respect for the item or artist(s). The conservator should also be highly trained in the medium in which these items were created. For example, wood preservation or acrylic on canvas.

In general, art works are static and not moving whereas musical instruments are basically an active art tool for producing the sounds notated on sheet music in various keys or tempos. Although some art objects may have more than one use and move periodically from its home institution to another museum on loan (besides providing cultural satisfaction), instruments are subject to: travel or wear and tear consistently due to continual playing. Musical instruments create art by producing sound because the human hand touches their skins, strings, bows, fret board or keys. Musical instruments are generally used on a regular basis, during recitals and concerts by all levels of musicians.

An instrumentalist should keep in mind how to play their instrument carefully so that they can preserve the integrity of the instrument. That being stated, each musician performs with an instrument differently, creating their own personality and take on the capabilities of that particular instrument (ex. Louis Armstrong and his trumpet). In a sense, the partnership between instrumentalist and instrument defines them both. "Players demand certain kinds of physical responses from an instrument, and players and listeners alike have certain preferences about the tone produced."

Despite how long musical instruments should last, it is important to try to maintain their playable conditions as long as possible. Similarly to automobiles that have been used on a daily basis over the years, musical instruments do not sound the same or work in the same manner that they once did when they were new. Parts wear out and at times just need to be replaced. On a side note, the average lifespan of instruments depends on the classification of them: "woodwinds or brass instruments last about twenty years, while pianos last about 100 years, and string instruments for a maximum of 200 years." With proper conservation techniques used on instruments, they will be able to last longer than their projected lifespans.

Some music composed during the 18th century by Wolfgang Amadeus Mozart was for the harpsichord, and if this music is to be historically understood it must be heard on an instrument of the original time period. The Smithsonian has maintained a harpsichord that some of the resident curators can periodically play. This can be seen via the short YouTube video entitled, "Play it Again." Although these Mozart compositions could be played on a piano, they would not sound the same as a harpsichord when a musician performs the piece.

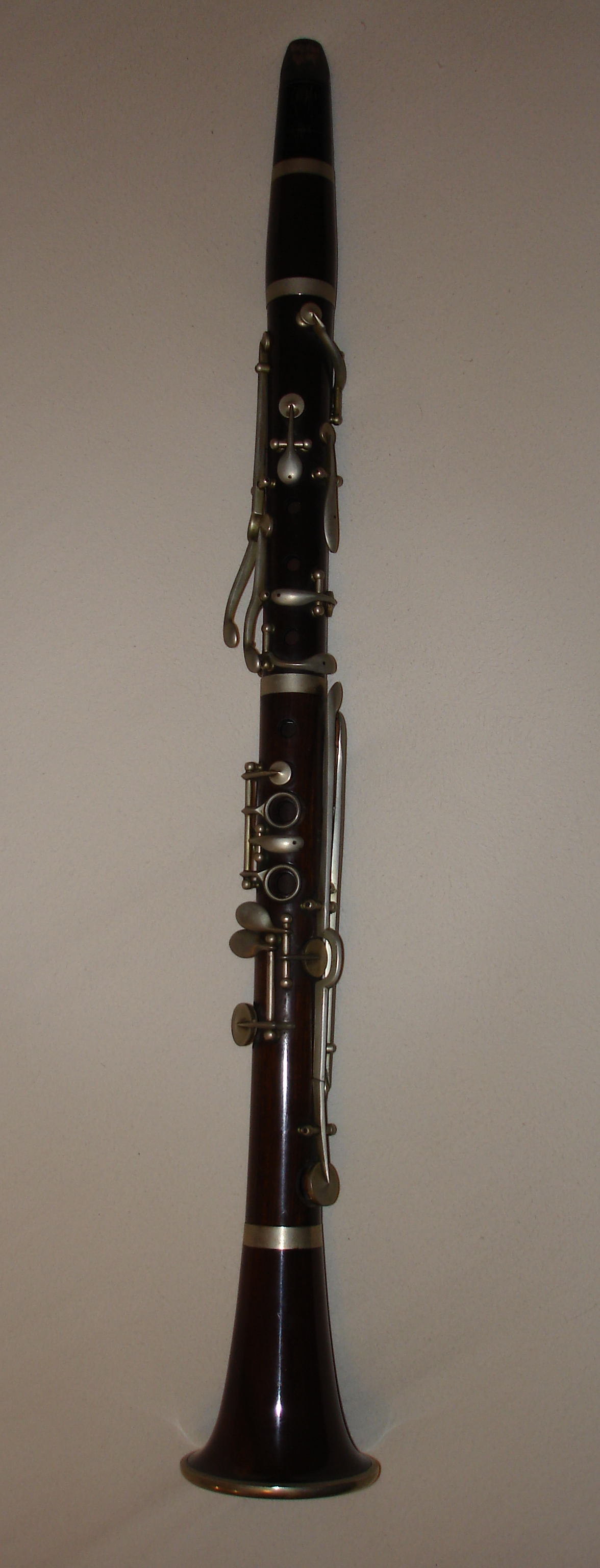
Late 19th century rosewood clarinet

Environmental obligations exist for both musical instrument creators and conservators. This is because the materials used in instrument creation, like wood, can be on the endangered species list. "Many species of rosewood and ebony are endangered, but the wood is still easily purchased ... Some timbers and materials used by luthiers has legal restrictions, especially when crossing international boundaries." There appears to be a mission to conserve both art or cultural artifacts and environmental conservation in the realm of musical instrument conservation.

== Classification systems ==
In 1914, the Curt Sachs and Erich Moritz von Hornbostel's system for the Classification of Musical Instruments was created. It is divided into five main sections with several subcategories. Understanding how an instrument is intended to be used and which of these categories it falls into is vital information if a conservator is to determine how a piece will need to be repaired in order for it to be safely playable. Additionally, understanding the construction of an instrument and where it is experiencing tension will help to determine the safest methods of storage.

The five main sections are defined as:

Idiophones – Idiophones are instruments that rely on the body of the instrument to create and resonate sound. Most commonly constructed of metal, a conservator will need to examine the metal for cracks and tarnish that will negatively impact the sound and structural integrity of the instrument.

1. Concussion – Instruments that create sound when struck against a similar object such as castanets
2. Friction – Instruments that create sound when rubbed such as a glass harp
3. Percussion – Instruments that create sound when struck such as a triangle
4. Plucked – Instruments that create sound when plucked such as a harp
5. Scraped – Instruments that create sound when scraped such as a washboard
6. Shaken – Instruments that create sound when shook such as a maraca
7. Stamping – Instruments that create sound when stamped against a hard surface such as a tap shoes
8. Stamped – The sound that the surface itself makes when something is stamped against it

Membranophones – Membranophones are instruments that have a membrane that is stretched over a structure, often wood or metal, and struck or rubbed to produce a sound. The subcategories are largely determined by the shape of the structure that the membrane is stretched over. For many historic membranophones to become playable again, a conservator may have ti weigh replacing the membrane of the piece.

1. Kettle drums
2. Tubular drums
3. Friction drums
4. Mirlitons – This subsection is unique to the membranophones category as it relies on air passing over the membrane, rather than it being struck. The most common example of a mirliton is a Kazoo
5. Frame drums/Pot drums/Ground drums

Chordophones – Chordophones are instruments that use vibrating strings, which are most commonly stretched across a metal or wooden structure, to create sound. Similar to the membranes used on membranophones, the strings that are used on chordophones may need to be replaced if an instrument is to be performed with. A conservator will need to examine the structure of the instrument to see if stress cracks from the tension of the strings have begun to develop.

1. Musical Bows
2. Harps
3. Lyres
4. Lutes
5. Zithers

Aerophones – Aerophones are instruments that require air passing through, or across, them to create sound. Most commonly constructed of wood or metal, a conservator will need to examine the innards for mold or debris that will prohibit air from passing easily through the instrument.

1. Brasswinds – The most commonly known is the trumpet
2. Woodwinds – The most commonly known is the flute
3. Free-Reed – The most commonly known is the accordion
4. Free – Free instruments are unique to the aerophone category due their reliance on air passing around the instrument, rather than through it. The most common example is a whip when it is cracked.

Electrophones – Instruments that require electricity to be amplified and heard

== Conservation practices ==
Musical instruments are often very fragile and complex objects that should be conserved both externally and internally. When deciding the course of a conservation treatment, conservators should be experts in the history of the instrument and its material. Conservators should aim to restore the instrument to its original physical form or acoustic playability in the least destructive way possible using "non destructive analytical tools". Techniques such as spot treatments should be used to test the instruments reaction to particular conservation treatments in controlled areas, and technology such as CT scans and X-radiography should be used by conservators to analyze the internal mechanisms of musical instruments without invasive measures.

Conservators of musical instruments can also borrow conservation science methods from other objects to which instruments are similar. Instruments often "have moving parts or they require physical interaction to fulfill the purpose for which they were made. They have this in common with many other objects including clocks, transport vehicles, arms and armor, hand tools, domestic utensils, scientific apparatus and industrial machinery".

String instruments rely on the plucking of strings to create sound. Conservators should be versed in not only the construction of the instrument itself, but also the tension levels required to maintain the ideal acoustic sound of a particular instrument. Woodwind instruments are most often constructed of wood or metal but other materials such as plastic or brass may be used as well. Since air is blown into woodwind instruments to create sound, humidity can be trapped inside instruments. This is a particular concern for wooden woodwinds. Brass instruments are made exclusively of brass. Corrosion should be the highest concern for conservators working with brass instruments. Percussion instruments are particularly vulnerable as they are instruments designed to be struck or hit in order to create sound.

== Ethics and playability ==
Determining the playability of musical instruments can be difficult, especially in terms of the ethics of conservation-restoration. Ethical codes state that the aesthetic, historic and physical integrity of an object must to be respected. Often returning an instrument to playable condition requires modifications that cannot be readily undone, and removing unserviceable parts may also mean removing important historical evidence, such as original tool marks. Ethically, it is important to note that any techniques where the results cannot be undone should not be used in the conservation-restoration of instruments. Karp outlines five recommendations to consider when dealing with a damaged historic musical instrument. First, do not physically alter a musical instrument if lacking restoration experience. Second, understand the difference between an instrument maker/repairer and a restorer. Instrument repairers do not necessary have the skillset to modify historic instruments. Third, adhere to the "principle of reversibility". No modifications that cannot be "easily and completely be undone in light of future improved knowledge" should be permitted. Fourth, sufficiently document the entire restoration procedure with written and photographic records. Lastly, consult with outside sources and attempt to follow the procedures of similar previous restorations. Playability depends on the overall strength of the architecture of the instrument as well as the musician's interpretation or technique of a musical score. There are always two sides to every story: those for restoring musical instruments and those that are against. One of the arguments supporting the playing of instruments is that as a condition of their inclusion in public collections they are to be played. Other times, historical instruments are tied to educational institutions and certain period music cannot be fully appreciated without the use of historical instruments. Furthermore, Lamb argues that unlike art, musical instruments were not originally constructed to be put on a display—they were designed to be performed and heard. It is impossible to fully appreciate the beauty of a musical instrument without physically interacting with it. Musical instruments are functional objects that require this human interaction, and they should not be treated as a static painting or other work of art. On the other hand, Barclay argues for a much more cautious approach, claiming that musical instruments can and should be judged by exactly the same standards applied to paintings, sculptures, and the decorative arts. He claims that the risk of mechanical damage to the instruments from handling and playing them far outweighs present enjoyment. For example, he suggests that the way in which scholars analyze historical objects, as well as their research interests, transform over time. Thus, playing and possibly damaging these instruments may prevent future historians from being able to conduct their analyses of those same instruments. While restoration work is done with the right intentions restoring an instrument to playable condition has proven to be detrimental to the long term preservation of instruments and is inconsistent with standards of practices for other classes of museum objects. "The opponents of restoration argue that the truly authentic instrument is a reproduction of that relic, to the best of present knowledge and ability, in a state equivalent to what it was when new." "A great deal of progress could result from making a distinction between "soundability" and playability, where the former can often be achieved without any prerequisite restoration." Therefore, who in the cultural artifact conservation world draws the line between "soundability" and playability? Musical instruments are designed to be played, they have moving parts that are intended to be used. The integrity of an instrument includes its sound, however, playing an instrument is inherently destructive and many times attempts to return instruments to playable condition mean modifying the original in ways that are not easily undone. The restoration of musical instruments is highly debated, this is due in part to the fact that notion of playability has not been defined enough. It is agreed upon that historic instruments are vital to understanding the history of music, but it is possible that reproductions may produce a more authentic sound, and a sound closer to that of the original instrument in its prime, than a restored original would sound. By playing reproductions it also eliminates the debate between ethics and playability, since the reproduction is not the original instrument.

=== Factors for functional restoration ===
According to Robert Barclay, the following are a list of the top five reasons for functional restoration. First, a restoration can be completed if "the instrument is mass-produced." Second, if "the instrument has been previously restored and most ephemeral has been lost." Third, with a little bit of work from a conservator, "the instrument can easily be put into working condition." Fourth, "the original function can be reestablished." Lastly, if "the instrument is in sturdy condition," then it could be conserved. Its also vital to consider functional restoration if a reproduction instrument would not produce results equivalent to what a restored instrument would produce. This is very important to consider, especially if a historical instrument is tied to an educational institution.

=== Factors against functional restoration ===
Barclay also mentions some explanations for not functionally restoring musical instruments and the top five reasons are as follows. First a musical instrument should not be conserved if "the instrument is unique." Second, work should not be completed if "the original ephemeral features will be lost or altered." Third, the way the instrument could be played is unknown or "the function is obscure and unlikely to be determined as a result of restoration." Fourth, "the condition of the instrument is such that an accurate achievement of its original quality of function is unlikely." Lastly, if "the function is so well understood that no new information is likely to be gained."

Functional restoration does not always align with the ethics and standards of practice of conservation-restoration. Functional restoration is generally more intrusive than basic conservation techniques, and will generally result in a greater loss of original components of the instrument.

== Condition reporting before and after restoration with photographs and other documentation ==
Similarly to the document(s) that a museum registrar might use to catalog an artifact into a collection, it is important to keep the proper paperwork during the conservation process being done on a musical instrument. (If interested, there is also an example of a museum condition report here from the Cleveland Museum of Contemporary Art. Additionally by taking before and after camera shots, it helps to document the steps taken by the conservator (or the rest of the conservation staff) while working on an instrument and the progress made during the duration of the project. A checklist could also help conservators stay focused on the task at hand trying to restore a particular musical instrument. But each plan is different for the conservation process depending on how severely wounded the instrument in question may be.
