= Gulnara Mashurova =

Kazakh harpist

Gulnara Mashurova was born in Almaty, Kazakhstan. She started piano studies at the age of 6 and by age 9 was chosen to study harp at the Pre Moscow Conservatory with Natalia Sibor. From 1991 to 1993 she studied with Vera Dulova at the Moscow Conservatory. Mashurova received a bachelor's and master's degree in harp performance from the Juilliard School as a Jerome Green full scholarship recipient studying under Nancy Allen, Principal Harpist of the New York Philharmonic. She received her second Masters in Orchestra Performance with a full scholarship from the Manhattan School of Music studying under Deborah Hoffman, Principal Harpist of the Metropolitan Opera Orchestra.

Mashurova was a regular substitute with the New York Philharmonic both in live performances and recordings and has toured extensively with the Orchestra. She has performed with the Metropolitan Opera Orchestra, Concertgebouw Orchestra, Suspeso Contemporary Ensemble, Absolute Ensemble, Stamford Symphony, Empire State Opera and the Silk Road Ensemble with Yo-Yo Ma.

Mashurova can be heard on recordings with the New York Philharmonic, Singapore Symphony Orchestra, The Silk Road Ensemble, NHK Japan and the Absolute Ensemble.

She has appeared as a soloist with the Singapore Symphony Orchestra, the Flagstaff Symphony and the Thailand Philharmonic. In 2006 and 2007, Mashurova travelled to her native Kazakhstan to promote harp repertoire by performing concertos, recitals and chamber music.

In 1994 she was a finalist in the World International Harp Competition in Cardiff, Wales. She has participated in the Pacific Music Festival, Norfolk Music Festival, Spoleto Festival USA and Spoleto Festival Italy.

In 2003, Ms Mashurova joined the Singapore Symphony Orchestra as Principal Harpist. She is also on the faculty of the Yong Siew Toh Conservatory of Music.

Ms Mashurova performs on a Lyon and Healy Style 23 harp.
