= Conservation and restoration of books, manuscripts, documents and ephemera =

Activity to extend the life of historical materials

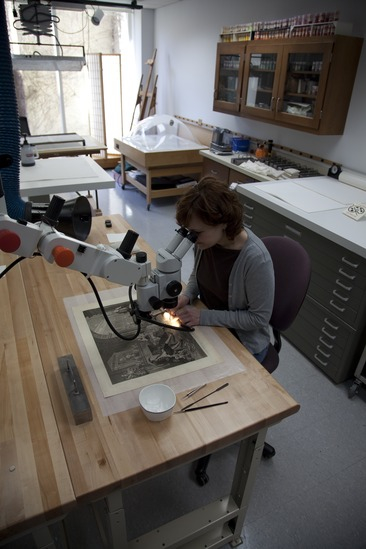
A conservation technician examining an artwork under a microscope at the Indianapolis Museum of Art

The conservation and restoration of books, manuscripts, documents and ephemera is an activity dedicated to extending the life of items of historical and personal value made primarily from paper, parchment, and leather. When applied to cultural heritage, conservation activities are generally undertaken by a conservator. The primary goal of conservation is to extend the lifespan of the object as well as maintaining its integrity by keeping all additions reversible. Conservation of books and paper involves techniques of bookbinding, restoration, paper chemistry, and other material technologies including preservation and archival techniques. In contemporary practice, this field also incorporates digital surrogacy as a supplemental preventive measure. By creating high-resolution digital copies, institutions can facilitate "information preservation" and broader access. It is a method that reduces the necessity for physical handling of fragile originals and aids in their long-term survival.

Book and paper conservation seeks to prevent and, in some cases, reverse damage due to handling, inherent vice, and the environment. Conservators determine proper methods of storage for books and documents, including boxes and shelving to prevent further damage and promote long-term storage. Carefully chosen methods and techniques of active conservation can both reverse damage and prevent further damage in batches or single-item treatments based on the value of the book or document.

Historically, book restoration techniques were less formalized and carried out by various roles and training backgrounds. Nowadays, the conservation of paper documents and books is often performed by a professional conservator. Many paper or book conservators are members of a professional body, such as the American Institute for Conservation (AIC) or the Guild of Bookworkers (both in the United States), the Archives and Records Association (in the United Kingdom and Ireland), or the Institute of Conservation (ICON) (in the United Kingdom).

== Definition ==
Conservation, restoration, and preservation, while similar, are each distinct. Conservation of books and paper involves protecting and stabilizing the material in its current state while retaining as much of the original materials as possible. Restoration involves returning a book or manuscript to as close to new condition as possible with the use of more invasive techniques and less retaining of original materials. Preservation is an umbrella term which encompasses conservation and restoration; however, the terms are sometimes used interchangeably when referring to library and archive conservation. Because conservation is one example of effort to preserve materials, it can be considered a subcategory of preservation. Conservation often accompanies preservation strategies such as proper storage and display, environmental monitoring, handling training, reformatting and security. The main goal of modern conservation is to maintain the integrity of the original parts of the object and that any additions due to restoration must be reversible. There are two approaches of conservation: active or interventive conservation and passive or preventive conservation. Active conservation involves evaluating the condition of an object and treating to prevent further decay by cleaning, repairing, and restoring when necessary. In preventative conservation, the science of storage and display are employed in order to control and stabilize the environmental conditions affecting the object in order to prolong its life span. Conservation incorporates the fields of bookbinding, restoration, paper chemistry, and other material technologies, as well as preservation of archival resources.

There are many nuances to conservation and conservators must make decisions about how they will treat the object based on how it will be used or displayed. For example, library conservation requires that the books be legible and usable, but not necessarily aesthetically pleasing. On the other hand, a book or document to be displayed in an exhibit may need to be presented in a more visually appealing condition. Paper-based items, such as books, scrapbooks, manuscripts, letters, journals and diaries, certificates, maps, deeds, newspapers, drawings, miniatures, and postcards present distinctive concerns when it comes to care and conservation. Unlike works of art on paper, these items are often handled directly and repeatedly to access information. Even paper ephemera like newspapers and letters may be significant historical records or family mementos.

== History ==
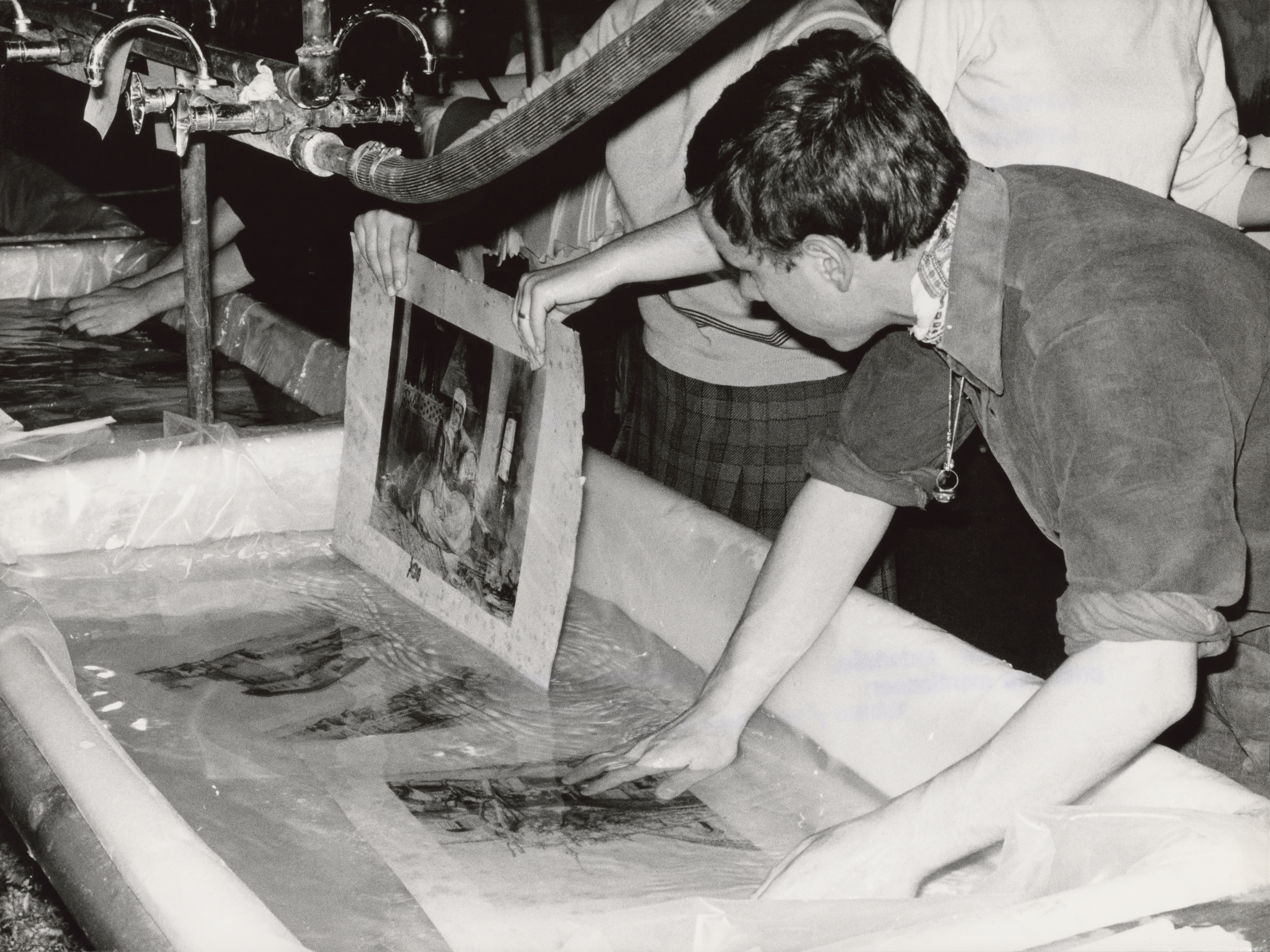
The conservation response to the 1966 flooding of Arno in Florence was a key event in formalising the book and paper conservation profession.

The history of early conservation has not yet been written, and early conservators recorded little of their work. Consequently, modern conservators are responsible for recording the previous conservation work they find when evaluating objects. As early as 750 BC, Old Testament prophets Isaiah and Jeremiah advised on the importance of the preservation of documents for future use. In 1627, Gabriel Naudé published Advis pour dresser une bibliothèqe, which contained a chapter discussing book preservation. The first substantial work on the subject of book restoration was Alfred Bonnardot's Essai sur l'art de Restaurer les Estampes et les Livres, first published in Paris in 1846. Until the late-nineteenth century, the preferred practice was to restore objects to newer or better condition with little regard to original style or composition. However, modern conservation seeks to treat books and paper as little as possible.

Peter Waters, considered the father of modern book conservation, was the conservation coordinator at the National Central Library after the 1966 flood of the Arno in Florence, Italy, and was accompanied by hundreds of conservators from around the world. Before the flood, library conservation was not yet an established field. The water affected one-third of the library collections including periodicals, newspapers, fine prints, maps, posters, and the Magliabechi and Palatine rare-book collections. The flood broke the tradition of maintaining proprietary trade secrets and conservation treatments as the disaster necessitated the collaboration of the world's most experienced book and paper conservators. One book and paper conservation technique that resulted from this collaboration was the development of the "heat-set tissue" paper mending. Another development from the Florence floods was the study of limp vellum binding and its usefulness in conservation due to its resistance to water damage. Experienced in large scale archival disasters, Waters defined seven essential requirements for successful recovery after the flood. The first publication of a standard of practice for conservators was published in August 1964 in Studies in Conservation by the International Institute for Conservation American Group, now the American Institute for Conservation (AIC). An updated version was released in 1994.

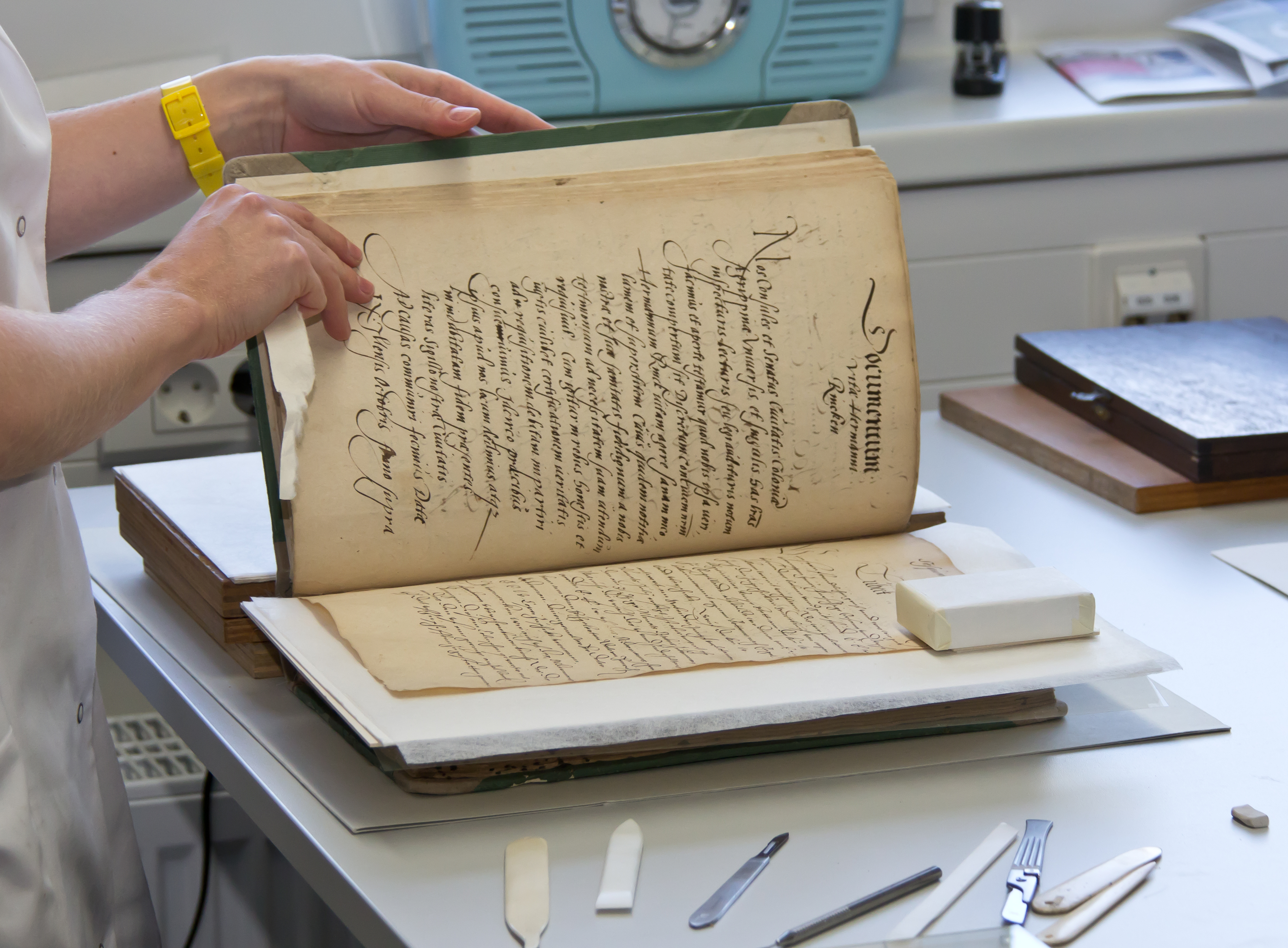
A paper conservator handling a book

Christopher Clarkson originally coined the term "book conservation" in Florence in 1967 in order to differentiate the early European conservation techniques which sought to preserve only the text of a book. Clarkson argued that "foreign marks" and "foreign matter" are important to understand the book's physical history and the social history in which the book resided and that this evidence of use should be preserved. In 1968, the International Centre for the Study of the Preservation and Restoration of Cultural Property organized an international seminar on the subject of conservation of library materials in Rome. In 1969, the first university-level conservation conference occurred at the University of Chicago where they published Deterioration and Preservation of Library Materials.

In the United States, the branch bindery for the Library of Congress was created in 1900 for the Government Printing Office, under Chief Clerk Arthur Kimball. This allowed for the first preservation activities to be carried out at the Library of Congress.

The Book and Paper Group (BGP) is the largest specialty group within the AIC. Through meetings and publications, the BPG exchanges information about the conservation of books and paper. The BPG releases a journal The Book and Paper Group Annual, on the subject of book and paper conservation.

Unique approaches have been made to drum up success in funding book conservation. For Duke University, members of the public can "adopt" a book in need of conservation repair through their Adopt-A-Book program, and helps current and future researchers have access to these materials.

== Agents of deterioration ==
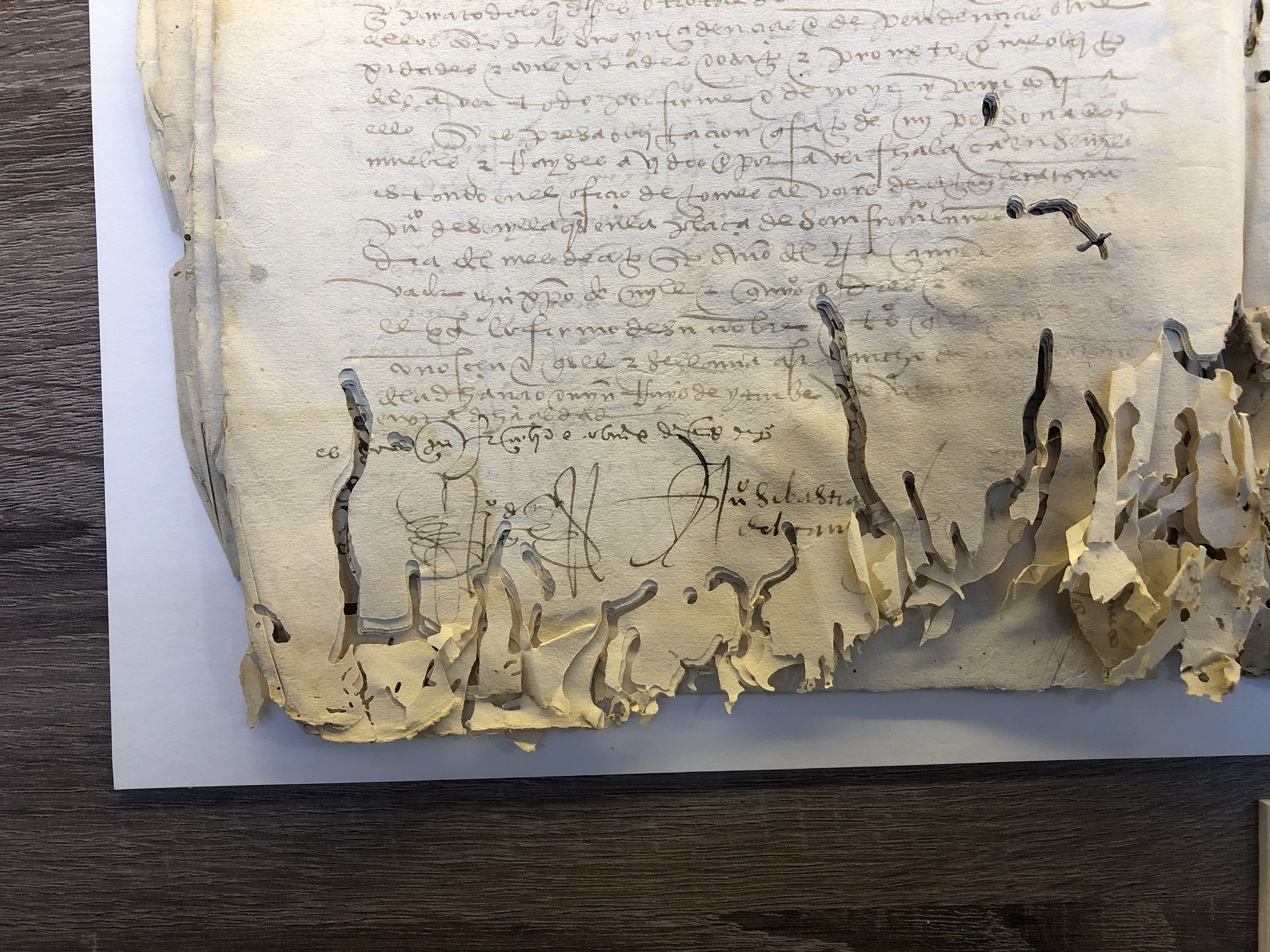
Insect damage to collections

Conservators must have knowledge of agents that cause decay in order to preserve items. Agents of deterioration can include mishandling, light, fluctuating humidity, dust and pollution, fire, water, gas and heat, neglect, and pests and other vermin. Inherent vice is "the quality of a material or an object to self-destruct or to be unusually difficult to maintain". Paper, books, manuscripts, and ephemera are prime examples of materials subject to inherent vice. Early paper was handmade from plant fibers such as flax, hemp, and cotton which are durable and can last for centuries. In the mid-19th century, machine-made paper was introduced, and wood pulp became the most common, least expensive ingredient in paper, especially in newspapers. The presence of lignin in wood pulp paper causes acid to degrade the cellulose, which causes the paper to become brittle and discolored over time. In addition, paper has the natural ability to absorb and retain moisture from the atmosphere, making it prone to the growth of mold, fungi, and bacteria. Furthermore, some inks used in old books and manuscripts are harmful to paper. Iron gall ink, most commonly used from the 8th century through the end of the 19th century, contains acid and can corrode the paper in humid conditions.

=== Mishandling ===
Poor handling is the primary cause of deterioration for books, manuscripts, and ephemera; however, a poor environment can also be a cause of deterioration for books and paper.

=== Pests and other vermin ===
Insects and vermin are naturally attracted to paper because paper is made of cellulose, starch and protein, materials that provide sources of nourishment. The most common pests are roaches, silverfish, and various types of beetles. Book lice feed on mold spores found on paper and cardboard, and although they do not cause visible damage, their decomposition and excretions can stain paper and may also nourish other pests, continuing the cycle of damage. Freezing collection items can mitigate pests. However, some materials should not be frozen, such as books made with leather, because the cold temperatures may cause the fat to rise to the surface of the leather resulting in a white or yellow area called a bloom. The use of insecticides directly on collection materials is not generally recommended. However, if the infestation is severe, and fumigation is the best option, the affected items should be separated from the rest of the collection for treatment.

=== Fluctuating humidity ===
Effect of excessive relative humidity on a bound volume

Extremes of temperature or relative humidity are damaging from either end of the spectrum (low or high). High heat and low relative humidity can cause paper to become brittle and leather bindings to crack. To mitigate these risks, institutional standards often suggest that the ideal relative humidity (RH) for paper collections be maintained at approximately 35%. The primary focus of such standards is environmental stability to prevent structural stress. Which means the fluctuation in humidity should not be too large. High temperatures and high relative humidity accelerate mold growth, foxing, staining, blooming, disintegration, and "red rot" in leather bindings, while excessively low humidity can cause organic fibers to lose flexibility and become increasingly brittle. Fluctuations in temperatures and humidity may also cause cockling: a wrinkling or puckering preventing the surface from laying flat. Air quality must also be taken into consideration.

=== Dust and pollution ===
Dust tends to absorb moisture, providing a suitable environment to attract mold growth and insects. Dust can also become acidic when combined with skin oils and the surface of paper.

=== Light ===
All kinds of light (sunlight, artificial light, spotlights) can be harmful. Light can result in fading, darkening, bleaching, and cellulose breakdown. Some inks and other pigments will fade if exposed to light, especially ultraviolet (UV) light present in normal daylight and from fluorescent bulbs. Natural sunlight is considered destructive due to its high intensity and its potential to cause localized warming and drying of the surrounding air. To mitigate these effects, archival standards often recommend excluding ultraviolet light, the most damaging component of the spectrum, by installing specialized filters on windows. In gallery or storage environments, common preservation practices include turning off lights when spaces are not in use and maintaining a minimum distance of 50 centimeters between light sources and bookshelves to prevent localized overheating that could accelerate the degradation of documents. Light damage is cumulative and cannot be reversed.

=== Fire ===
Smoke damages printed materials by leaving sticky or acidic residue, and extensive heat can cause pages and adhesives to become brittle. Fire-resistant containers or book covers are used to minimize damage. Materials exposed to flames may only be damaged externally. Risk management in documents often accounts for the correlation between fire and water damage; for instance, structural water leaks can trigger electrical short circuits, leading to fire outbreaks. Consequently, preventative protocols frequently include advance notification for plumbing or construction work, leaving ideally at least 48 hours in advance to allow the temporary relocation of collections or the implementation of protective barriers.

=== Water ===
Water damaged paper collections

Some of the most common forms of water damage to collections include leaking pipes or roofs, flooded basements, and open windows. These are considered small water emergencies and can be easily contained. Larger water emergencies include natural disasters such as hurricanes, flooding from heavy rains, water discharge at high pressure from fire hoses, sprinkler system malfunctions, and major construction accidents. The key to successful recovery of collections from water damage is disaster planning. Disaster planning encompasses assessing and mitigating risks, writing a plan, the initial response, and recovery efforts.

== Contamination of historic books ==
In the 19th century, Paris green and similar arsenic pigments were often used on front and back covers, top, fore and bottom edges, title pages, book decorations, and in printed or manual colorations of illustrations of books. Since February 2024, several German libraries started to block public access to their stock of 19th-century books to check for the degree of poisoning.

== Preventive conservation and storage ==
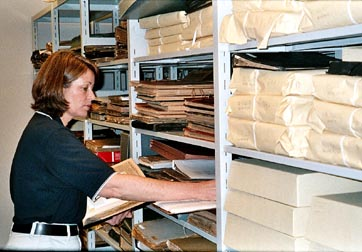
A paper conservator surveying a collection of materials in storage

Storage in a cool, dry, clean, and stable location can extend the life of an item. Manuscripts and paper documents are often stored in protective archival-quality boxes and folders, made of acid-free and lignin-free materials. Documents with heavy use may be stored or encapsulated in a clear polyester (Mylar) film sleeve or folder. As added protection against acid formation, paper-based storage materials may have a buffer, such as calcium carbonate, which can neutralize acids as they form in the storage materials. Boxes should not be overfilled. Items may be interleaved with acid/lignin-free paper. If boxes are only partially full, spacers may be used, or the box may be stored horizontally. Large format material is best stored in a plan cabinet with shallow drawers. The rolling of large items (e.g. maps) should be avoided where possible; but if there is no other option, the item should be rolled around a large diameter archival quality tube.

Average-size books should be shelved vertically, side-by-side so they can support each other. Shelves should not be overpacked and should stand away from exterior walls. Oversized or fragile books may be stored horizontally and completely flat, but stacking should be kept to a minimum. Books may be placed in supportive and protective boxes, to prevent soiling and abrasion and to provide structural support. Book boxes may range from simple four-flap enclosures made of archival safe paper or cardboard to custom clamshell or drop-spine boxes covered in book cloth.

Until recently, baked enamel steel shelving was considered the best option for book storage; however, if not properly baked the enamel coating can give off formaldehyde and other volatile compounds that can harm collections. Unless properly baked, enamel-coated shelves are no longer a widely recommended shelving option. Professional testing can confirm that shelves are properly baked. Powder-coated steel shelving prevents off-gassing problems associated with baked enamel. Chrome-plated steel shelving and anodized aluminum shelving are considered other options for metal shelving, aluminium shelving is considered the optimal choice, particularly for highly sensitive artifacts; however, it is also the most expensive. Wood shelving is a more economical option but the wood must be sealed to prevent the emission of acids and volatiles. The most recommended coating is moisture-borne polyurethane. Paints such as two-part-epoxy, latex, and acrylic can also be used, but they vary in their effectiveness and ease of use.

== Active conservation and repair techniques ==
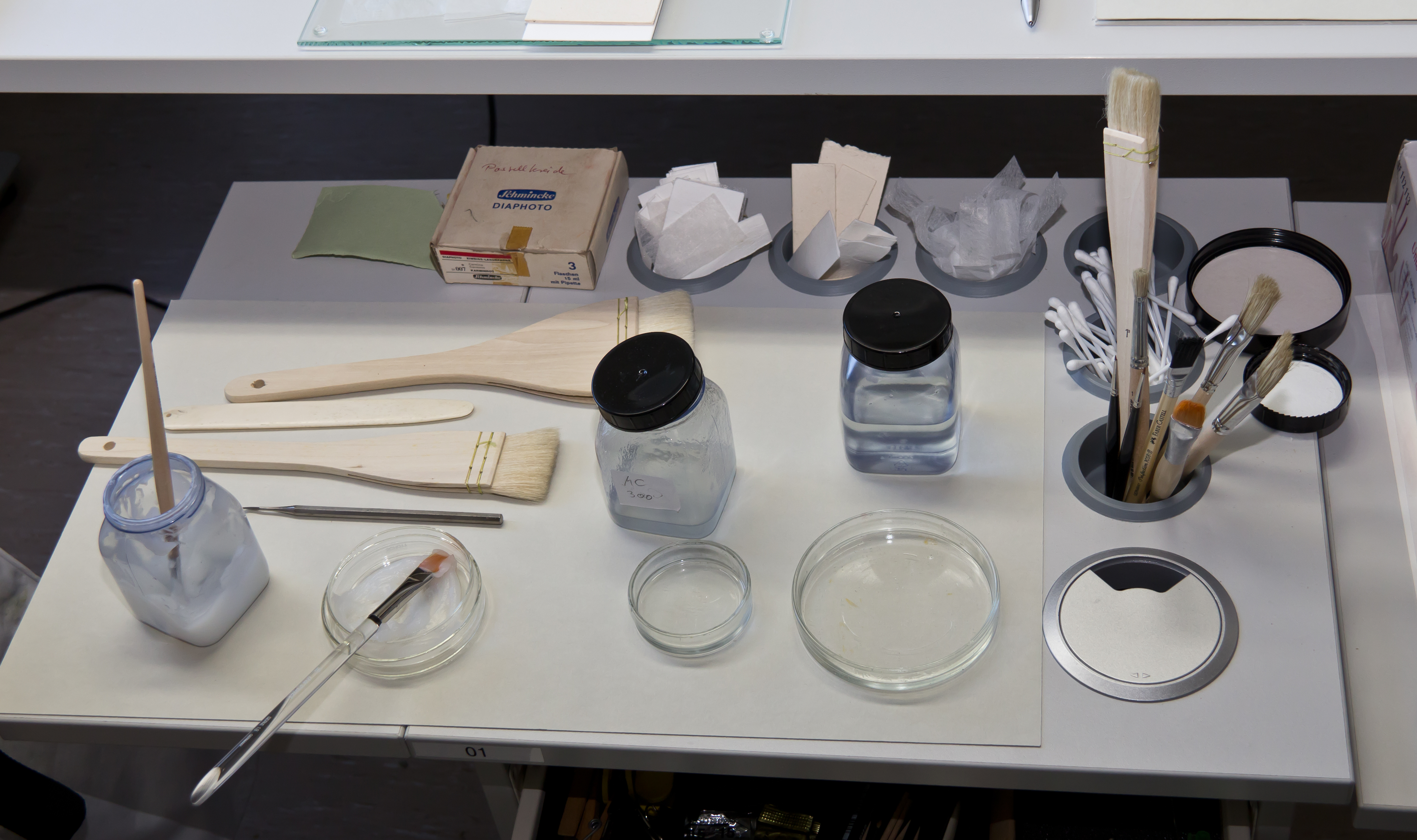
Book conservation tools and chemicals

The four stages of conservation include stabilization, cleaning, repair, and restoration.

Stabilization is the minimum level of treatment needed to slow deterioration. This can include wrapping or containing the object in an archival box, or making a custom one, as well as some basic structural repairs. Because books are made from a variety of materials, conservators may also need to employ techniques and experience relating to the conservation of leather, parchment, papyrus, or fabric conservation. To extend the functional lifespan of modern collections, particularly those produced on acidic wood-pulp paper, large scale deacidification treatments are frequently utilized. These mass deacidification processes employ alkaline buffers to effectively neutralize the acid content within the paper fibers. This chemical stabilization provides an alkaline reserve that can protect the material against future acid attack, potentially extending the life expectancy of the paper by three to five times.

The main objective of cleaning is to achieve clarity of surface detail. Books and documents may be subjected to different types of cleaning. Conservators may clean dust from paper and leather with a soft brush or cloths, a specialized vacuum cleaner, nonchemical vulcanized rubber sponges, or nonabrasive erasing materials such as vinyl erasers. In order to remove mold and insects, conservators use scalpels, aspirators, or specialized vacuum cleaners. Deep freezing is used to kill the insects. In addition, some longer-term and milder approaches have gradually been adopted. Controlled Atmosphere Fumigation reduces the oxygen concentration to below 1% by changing the air composition, such as introducing nitrogen or argon, thereby causing the death of pests within 2 to 6 weeks. It is a method that minimizes the risk of chemical reactions or physical stress to the delicate substrates of books and manuscripts.

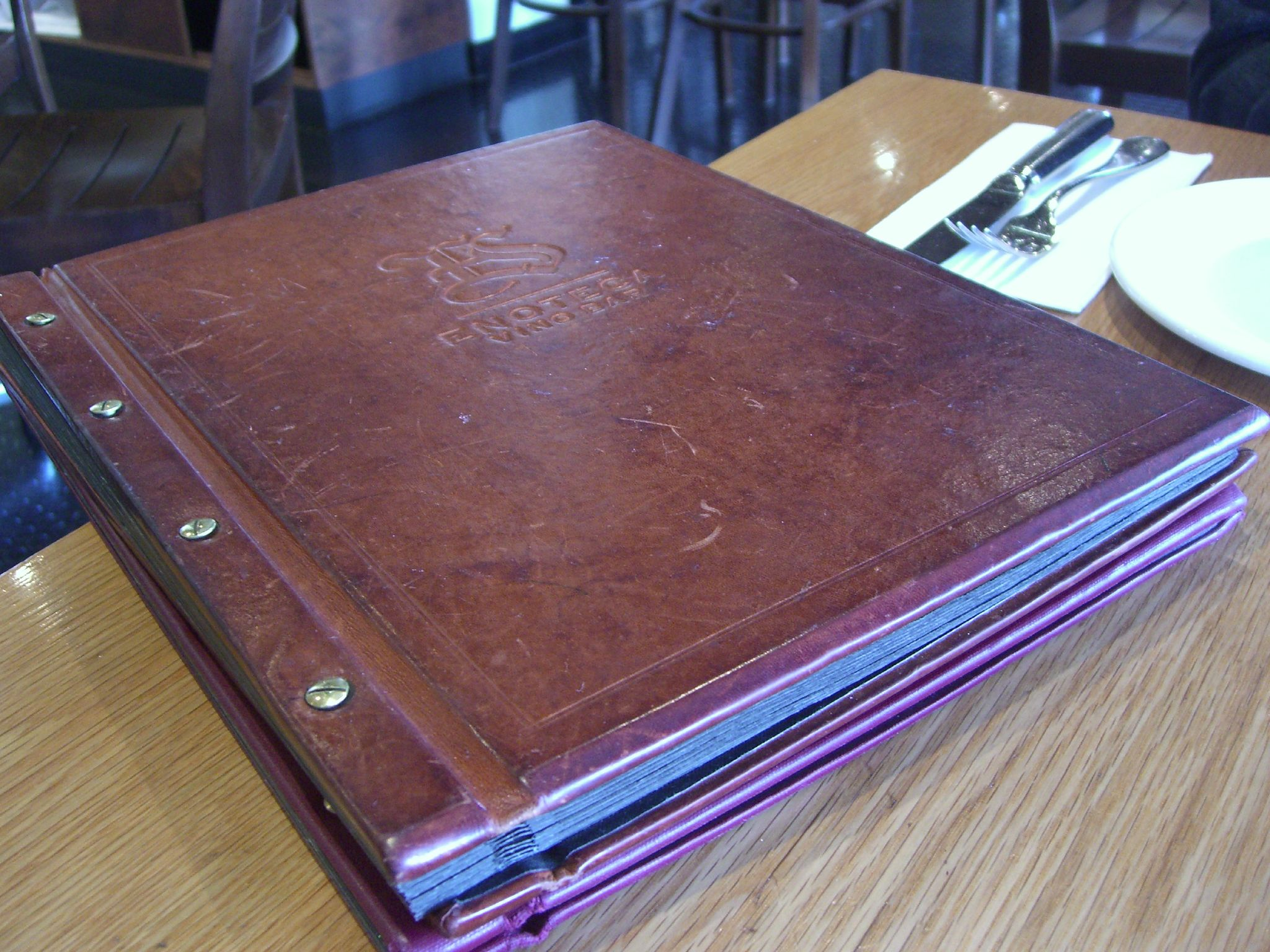
Leather bound wine list

Because some adhesive materials are acidic and stain paper, conservators have developed techniques to remove adhesive. Prior repairs made with water-based adhesives such as animal glue are removed in a water bath, by local application of moisture, or with poultices or steam. Synthetic adhesives and pressure-sensitive (self-adhering) tapes are usually dissolved or softened with an organic solvent before removal. Washing not only removes dirt and aids in stain reduction; it also washes out acidic compounds and other degradation products that have built up in the paper. Washing also relaxes brittle or distorted paper and aids in flattening. When washing alone does not combat acidity, conservators use an alkaline buffer applied by immersion or by spraying. Flattening follows aqueous treatment; paper is placed between blotters or felts under moderate pressure.

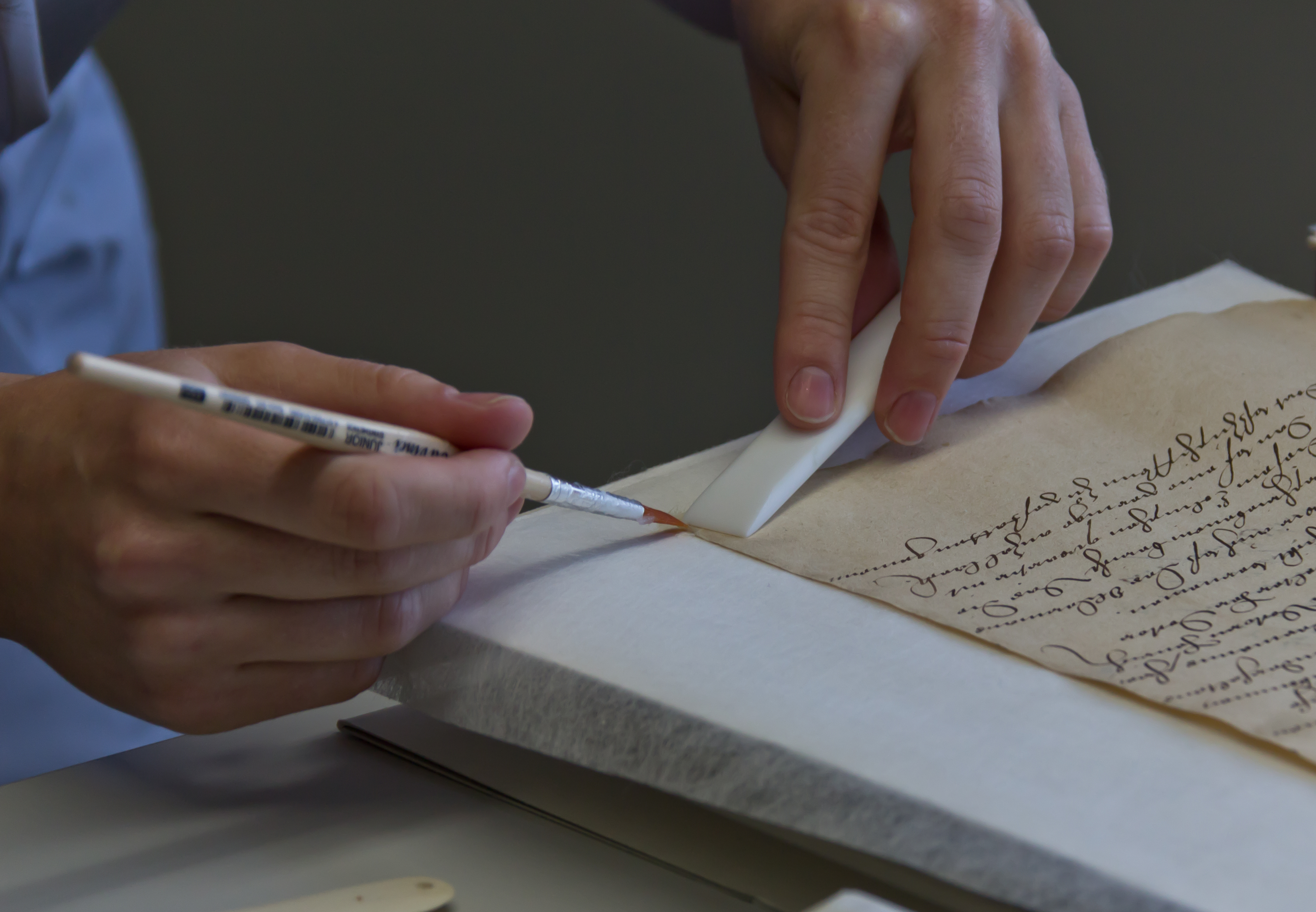
Book conservation techniques

When cleaning and alkalization alone are not sufficient to stabilize the artifact, conservators may opt to repair and restore the materials. Mending and filling techniques for paper include narrow strips of torn Japanese tissue adhered with a reversible non-staining adhesive such as starch paste or methyl cellulose. Paper can also be mended with heat-set tissue repair. Holes or paper losses are filled individually with Japanese paper, with paper pulp, or with a paper carefully chosen to match the original in weight, texture, and color. Books with broken sewing, loose or detached boards or leaves require special care. Several techniques are used in conservation binding. The original sewing in a volume is retained if this is possible but is sometimes reinforced using new linen thread and sewing supports. If the original binding is too deteriorated, the book may be rebound with new archival safe materials. Whole leaves or sheets of weak or brittle paper are reinforced by backing each sheet with another sheet of paper. Japanese paper is sometimes used as a backing, adhered with a starch paste.

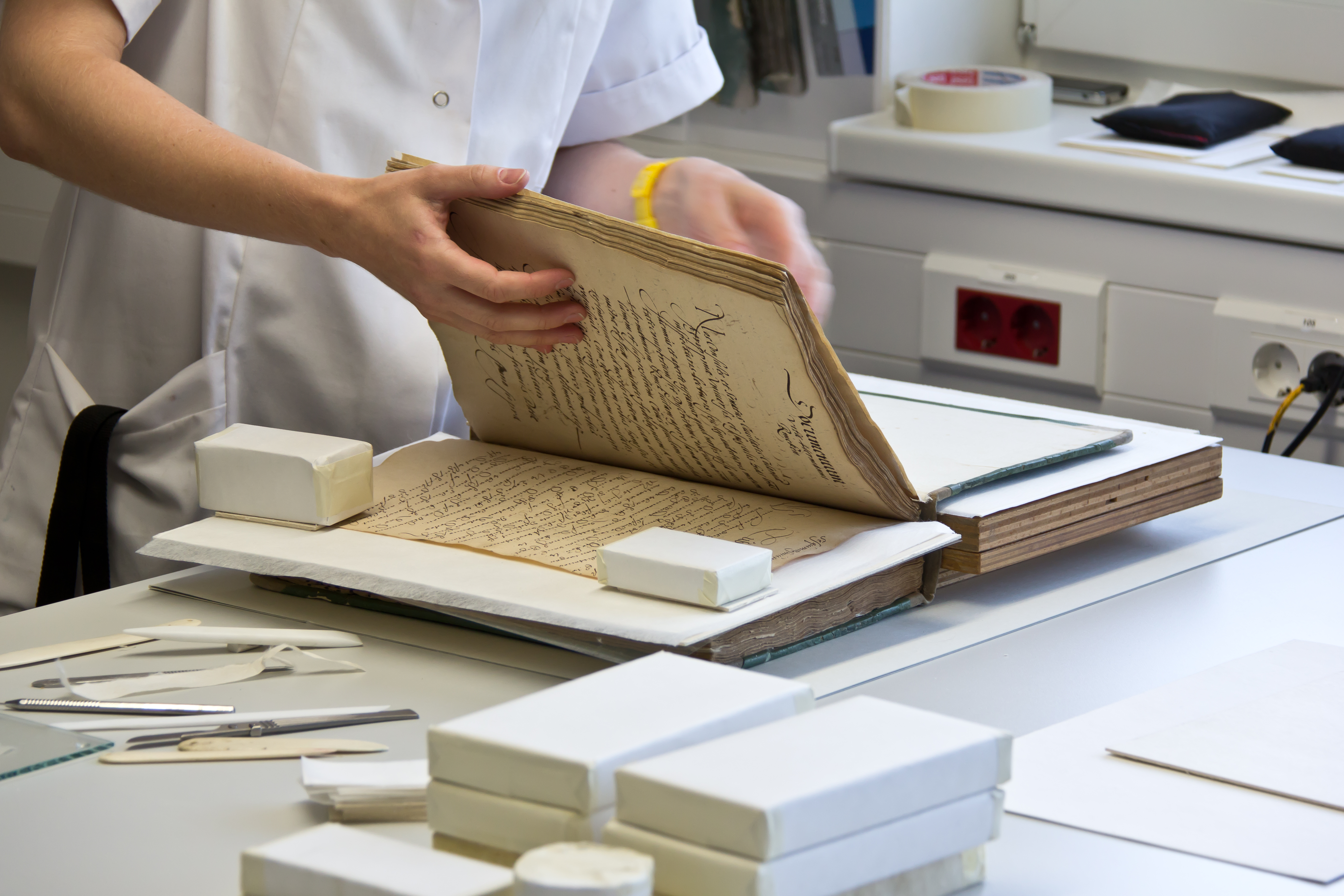
A book conservator examining pages of a bound volume

When extensive conservation of the object is impossible or not cost-effective, reformatting techniques are employed to minimize treatments and excessive handling. Reformatting options include photocopying, digitization, and microfilming. Many libraries and universities have book copiers where the book can be supported at an angle, avoiding the damage to its structure that can be caused by forcing it flat. In spite of the digital revolution, preservation microfilming is still used. Microfilm can have a life expectancy of 500 or more years, and only needs light and magnification to read. These reformatting techniques are not a solution by themselves however, and are typically used in conjunction with preventative conservation measures to maintain the original.

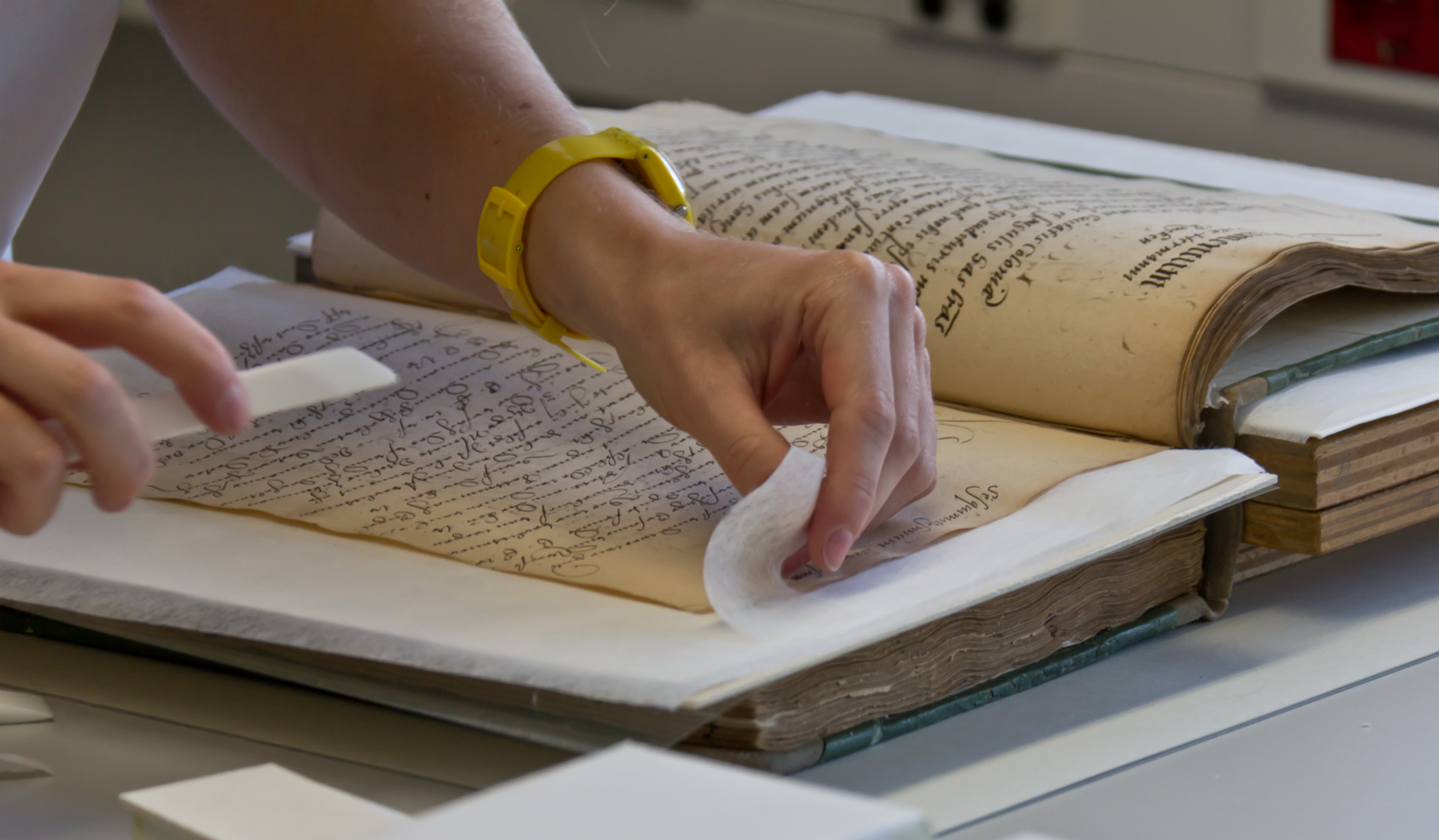
Book conservation techniques

Mass conservation preserves many books and documents with the same problems, which reduces the cost of treatment and individual handling. Given the great variety of material found in archival material that would require sorting and separate treatments, mass conservation is more often applied to library material than archival material. The only mass conservation treatment that can realistically be applied to archival material is preventive conservation by means of temperature and humidity-controlled environments. However, if archival material is sorted by material type, batch treatment can be applied to low to moderate value items. Batch treatment may include humidification, deacidification, or mending. Single-item treatment is required for high-value or complex books or documents that require detailed, individual documentation.

== Ethics ==
Many conservator-restorers abide by a code of ethics determined by a regional professional body, such as that of the American Institute of Conservation (AIC) for conservation professionals involved in caring for cultural artifacts. Book and paper conservators strive to ensure the integrity of the artefacts on which they work, encompassing the physical, aesthetic, historical and textual information. One method of applying this is through reversible treatments and alterations, so that repairs can be undone in the future as techniques evolve and improve. Consequently, book conservators are trained in the physical and chemical properties of the materials with which they work. However, complete reversibility is often impossible, thus conservators must be conscientious of the long term effects of chemical and physical treatments.

Furthermore, conservators must make decisions about which treatments best match the strength and material of the object. In some instances, conservators may decide that it is better to store the object and make a reproduction for use rather than treat it if no treatment options are available due to financial or technological limitations. In contemporary conservation ethics, the principle of "Minimum Intervention" is widely regarded as a fundamental approach. Rather than attempting to restore an item to its original "new" state, this ethic prioritizes the stabilization of its current physical condition. Restoration should not aim to turn old books back into "new ones", but should focus on stabilizing their current state and preserving all historical traces, including annotations on the margins or binding details. Moreover, if treatment is used, it must be used as sparingly as possible to maintain the aesthetic and historical integrity of the artifact. Generally, conservation techniques aim to mend and stabilize the item so it can be stored and used long-term. Conservators must consider the ethics of how a book or document should be restored or replicated without losing its aesthetic and historical integrity. Another ethical aspect of book conservation is the detailed documentation of treatments and alterations including procedures and materials used. Photographic documentation is usually more detailed for single-item treatments than for batch treatments. A trained conservator can observe past treatments done on the book or document, but good documentation specifies the exact techniques and materials used.

Historically, there was no codified set of rules for book and paper conservation. According to Andrew Oddy in 1992, "modern scientific conservation is governed by an unwritten set of rules or ethics". There have been many failed attempts to codify these "rules" because conservation requires individual application and is dependent on the goals of the museum and curator; consequently, these approaches cannot be generalized. Paul N. Banks wrote "The Laws of Conservation", also known as The Ten Laws of Conservation; though never officially published, they have been widely shared by his students.

== Sustainability ==
As part of actions to mitigate climate change, book and paper conservators increasingly implement sustainability-focused changes to their practice on either a personal or organisational level. Methods for increasing the sustainability of book and paper conservation work include the responsible sourcing of tools and repair materials (e.g. bamboo spatulas), the use of less industrial chemical solvents and safer chemical alternatives, the use of fewer animal-sourced products (e.g. replacing gelatine glues with synthetic ethylene-vinyl acetate emulsions), and reducing the amount of labour and energy required in conservation activities (e.g. preventive treatment measures, using materials sparingly).

In the early 2000s, conservators determined that preservation of materials should no longer be governed by a universal standard but rather rely on a localized approach. This allows for more holistic methods determined by the regional climate, resources, historical care practices and collection types.

== See also ==
- Foxing
- Inherent vice
- Book rebinding
- Mass deacidification
- Conservator-restorer
- Preservation (library and archive)
- Conservation and restoration of parchment
- Conservation and restoration of photographs
- Conservation and restoration of cultural property
- Radiography of cultural objects including X-ray microtomography combined with digital analysis techniques are methods used to access the contents of sealed documents or fragile scrolls while conserving the integrity of the physical substrate.
