= Conservation and restoration of panel paintings =

Preservation of heritage collections

The conservation-restoration of panel paintings involves preventive and treatment measures taken by paintings conservators to slow deterioration, preserve paintings, and repair damage. Panel paintings consist of a wood support, a ground (linen or parchment sized with glues, resin, and gesso), and an image layer (encaustic, tempera, oil). They are typically constructed of two or more panels joined by crossbeam braces, which can separate due to age and material instability caused by fluctuations in relative humidity and temperature. These factors compromise structural integrity and can lead to warping and paint flaking. Because wood is particularly susceptible to pest damage, an integrated pest management (IPM) plan and regulation of the conditions in storage and display are essential. Past treatments that have fallen out of favor because they can cause permanent damage include transfer of the painting onto a new support, planing, and heavy cradling. Today's conservators often have to remediate damage from previous restoration efforts. Modern conservation-restoration techniques favor minimal intervention that accommodates wood's natural tendency to react to environmental changes. Treatments may include applying flexible battens to minimize deformation or simply leaving distortions alone, instead focusing on preventive care to preserve the artwork in its original state.

== Preventive care ==
Preventive conservation involves the mitigation of potential threats to the stability of an artifact or specimen through a number of means. Several threats cannot be managed by conservators - for example, fire, flood, natural disaster, physical force, and theft cannot be foreseen, and inherent vice can only be addressed through prudent risk management, care, and handling of museum objects.

Other risks can be addressed by conservation and curatorial staff. This includes mitigating environmental damage by correcting improper storage conditions, which may lead to damage from pests, water, humidity, and mold, and can be further catalyzed by regional and seasonal environmental fluctuations and pollution. Deterioration caused by light exposure, when objects are examined, exhibited, photographed, and transported, can also be managed. Integrated pest management plans can help avert damage caused by living creatures. Proper handling protocols can help prevent chemical damage caused by contact with skin oils and structural damage from physical stress.

=== Environmental conditions ===
Fluctuating humidity and temperatures can lead to structural damage of a painted surface, due to long-term cumulative damage. In panels that are made up of multiple pieces of wood composing the larger surface area, the damage is most often visible where the pieces of wood are attached. Temperatures should range between +/- 5% of 70 °F and the humidity between +/- 5% of 50% relative humidity. A relative humidity over 65% can lead to mold growth and dry rot.

Panel paintings are subjected to various environmental conditions during exhibition. Regulating temperature, relative humidity, light intensity and duration of exposure, and atmospheric pollutants, are essential factors in painting conservation. Air filtration via HVAC systems can reduce gases and airborne pollutants within exhibition spaces and storage areas. Maintaining light levels as low as possible, between 50 and 150 Lux, will minimize cumulative and irreversible light damage.

=== Integrated pest management ===
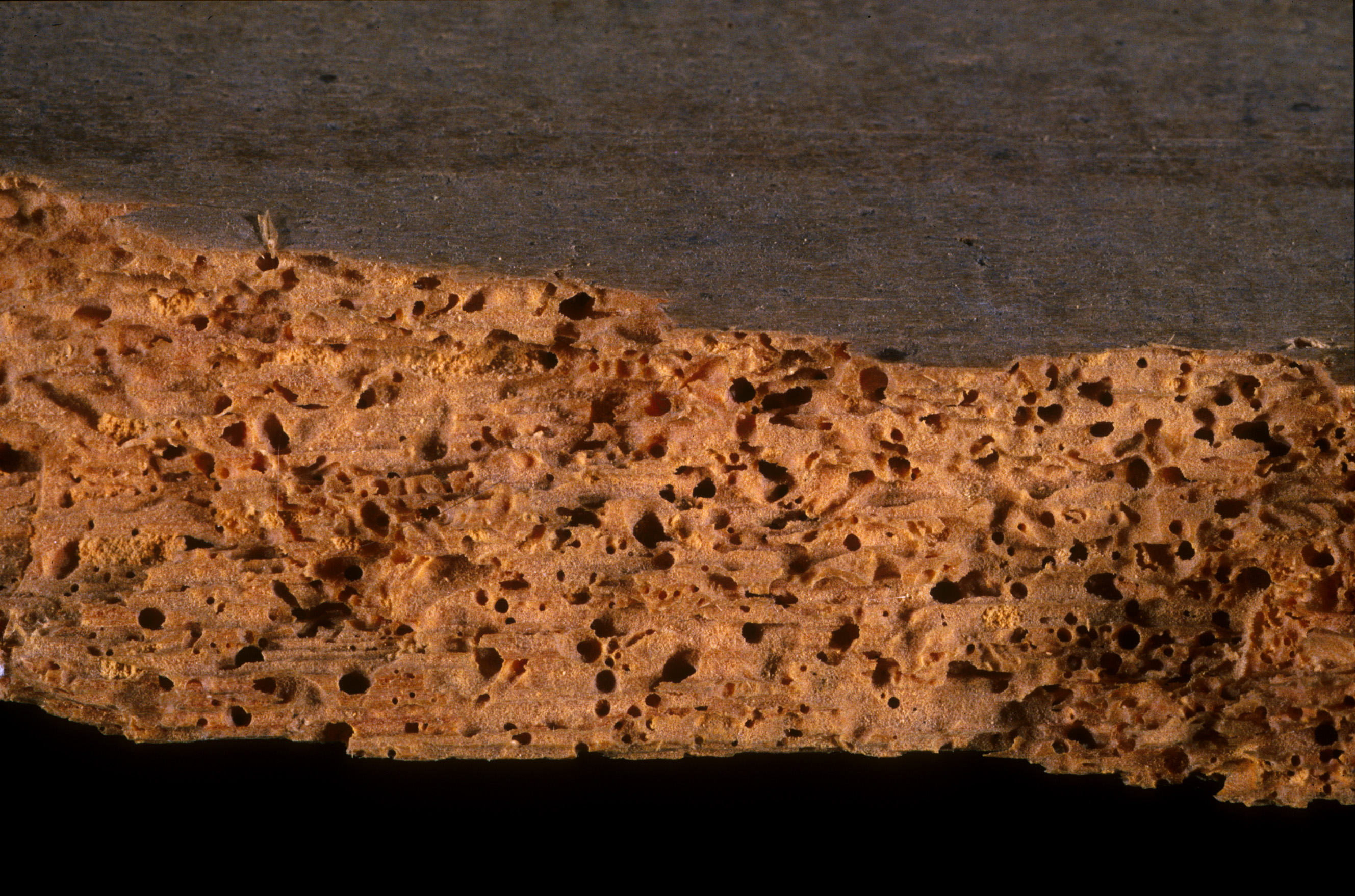
Damage done by a furniture beetle

Integrated pest management policies are created to reduce or limit any problems relating to pests damaging objects within collections. Basic elements of IPM policies include restricting food and sugary drink consumption in exhibition, storage, and surrounding areas and maintaining cleanliness in exhibition and storage areas. Storage is also important when it comes to pest management, climate control, assessment of HVAC systems, and contamination due to exposure.

=== Handling ===
Prior to any handling, an examination of the work should be completed, looking for signs of weakened structure and material stability. Both the painting, and the space to which it is being transferred, should be measured. These notes should be shared with preparators, registrars, and curatorial staff. The recommended handling method for panel paintings is similar to that of canvas and other two-dimensional works. Conservators are the only persons that should touch the front or back of a painting. The panel should be held by the edges using nitrile gloves and carried with two hands or in tandem by two people, depending on size. Multiple paintings should never be handled at the same time. The procedure includes planning the move, handling the painting and communicating with staff. Painting carts and other tools may be used, including a pallet jack or furniture dolly for moving a panel within a crate. The Metropolitan Museum of Art, the Canadian Conservation Institute, and the Australian Institute for the Conservation of Cultural Material provide general guidelines on proper care and handling.

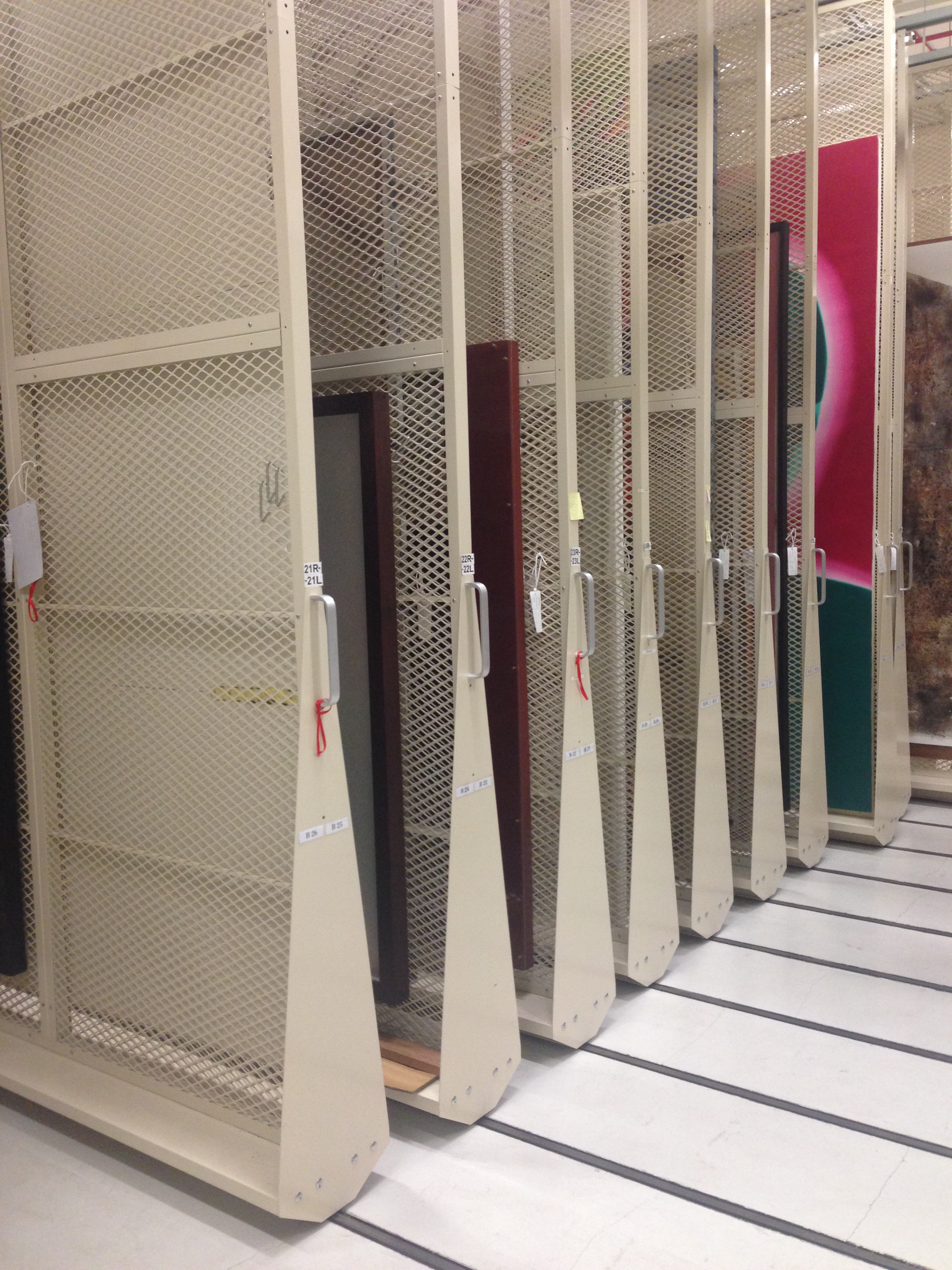
Storage room, Heritage Conservation Centre, Singapore

=== Storage ===
Typical storage units in museums include sliding screens or slotted shelves made out of MDF and heat-treated wood coated in polyurethane. "S" hooks are used to hang objects with the proper hanging hardware (e.g. D-Rings or eye brackets with picture wire) onto a screen. Temporary storage solutions include the use of ethafoam, moving/packing blankets, and archival corrugated cardboard. These storage methods are employed in order to minimize exposure to heat, light, and humidity, and pests. All exposure is cumulative, so it is important to carefully assess the challenges of exhibition conditions, as well as transportation, and storage of objects when they are not being displayed. As objects become more fragile over time, the ability to display them can be challenged by deterioration concerns.

== Agents of deterioration ==
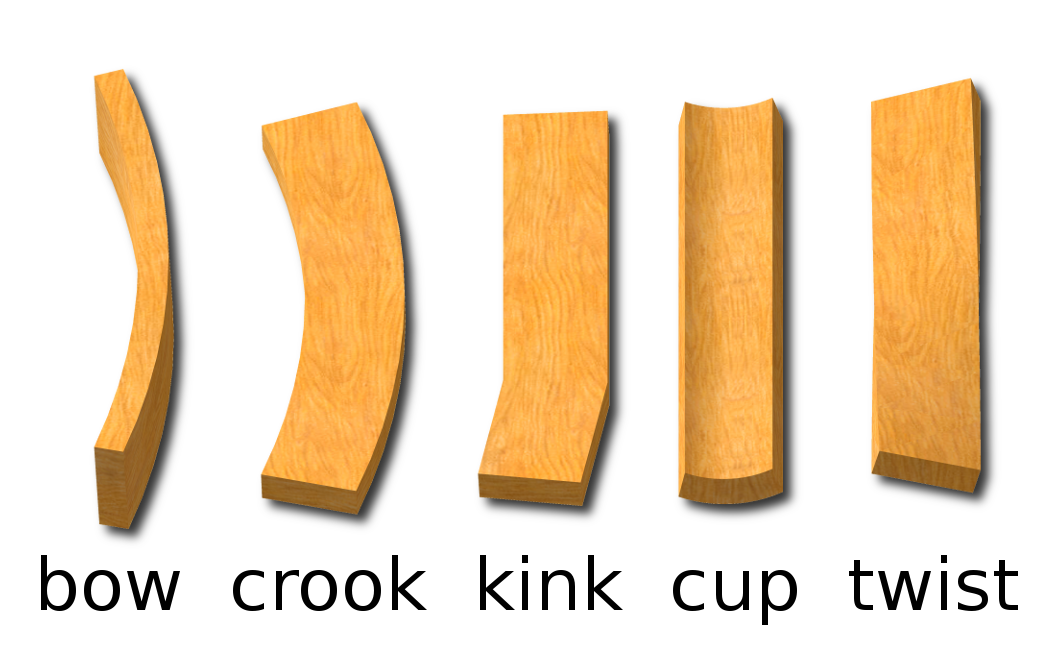
Computer rendered illustration of different types of wood warping

Damage may occur for a variety of reasons, generally known as agents of deterioration. Typical agents of deterioration include:

=== Physical force ===
Mishandling, overhandling, being dropped or stored improperly can all cause physical damage to panel paintings.

=== Fire ===
Fire may destroy a painting entirely, or damage may be caused due to the heat and smoke of a fire. Paint may become brittle or wood may warp.

=== Temperature and relative humidity ===
Paintings may be affected by fluctuating temperature and relative humidity. Low humidity reduces the chemical changes to the materials in a panel painting but raises the risks of mechanical damage to the paint by making it more brittle. High humidity reduces mechanical damage such as brittle paint but raises the risks of biological organisms, such white efflorescence and green-to-black stains on a panel painting. High temperatures and humidity in enclosed storage or exhibition space may lead to excess moisture that raises the risks of curving or warping of the wood over time, forcing the paint to flake off.

=== Water ===
Water damage may cause swelling, as seen in a case study by the Getty Conservation Institute, and water-soluble paints and other materials may dissolve. A wooden panel may also be distorted, split, shrunken, or stained when subjected to water. Mold may also occur, as the materials are organic.

=== Pests ===
In conservation, pests are defined as living creatures able to damage or destroy material culture. Microorganisms, such as mold or bacteria, are considered pests, as are insects and rodents. Any of these can cause damage to a panel painting, especially wood pests such as termites or carpenter ants.

=== Light and ultraviolet radiation ===
Overexposure to light and ultraviolet radiation may cause fading over time. A material's colorant sensitivity, or the estimate of how much light exposure it should be able to tolerate before fading, determines how an object may be stored and exhibited. Panel paintings should never be exposed to heat, including photographic lamps. It is recommended that HMI lamps are used for photographing panel paintings.

== Examination ==
The first step in developing a conservation-restoration plan is close examination to estimate the condition of both the panel and paint. This allows conservators to ascertain the full extent of damage and make a risk assessment. Techniques include visual observation and technically assisted examination through diagnostic studies and analysis.

=== Structural ===
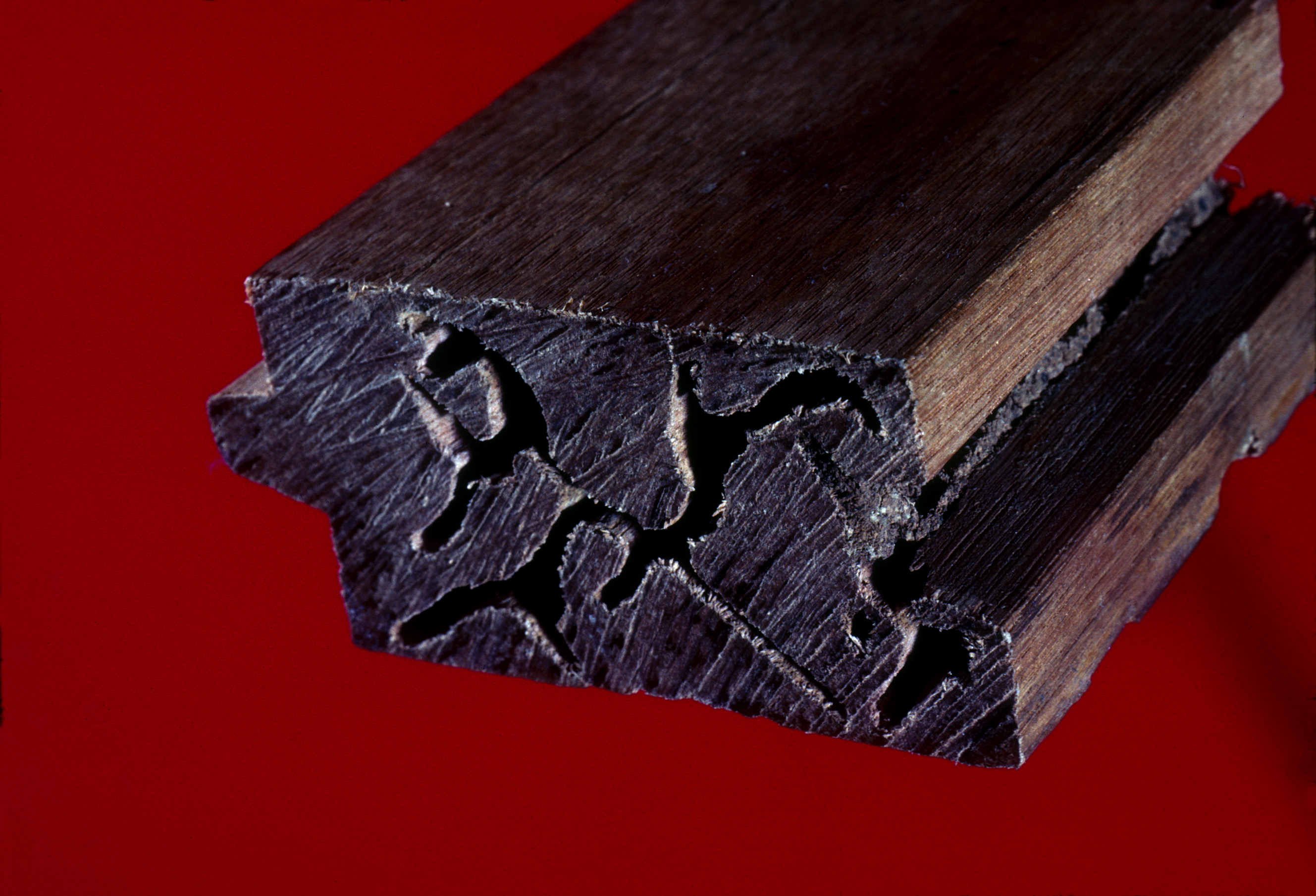
Borer damaged wood

Technologies commonly used to examine the structure of paintings and identify previous treatments include radiography and infrared reflectography (IR). Radiography reveals the type, condition and density of the wood, as well as any pest damage or activity. Furniture and larder beetles can burrow into wood compromising its internal structure and should be treated before proceeding with the restoration. IR, raking light photography, and low-magnification observation are useful in determining damage and distortion to the wood and paint surface.

=== Surface and painting ===
Photographic documentation, magnification, and visual observation with the naked eye under diffuse or raking light are common methods of surface examination. Radiography can also be used to reveal the opacity of specific paint colors. Degradation to the surface of panel paintings is often a sign of underlying structural issues, temperature and humidity fluctuations, and wood-boring pests.

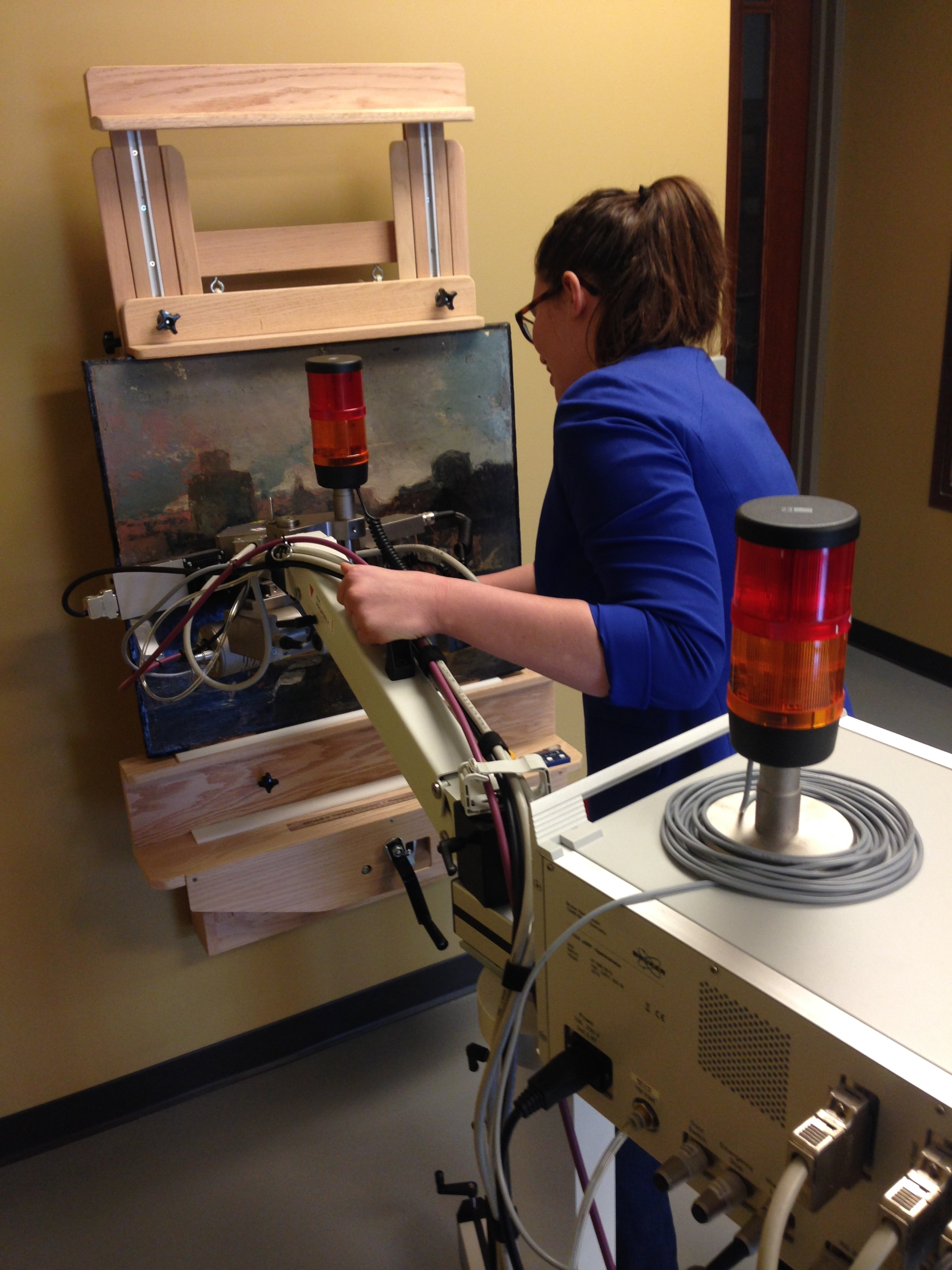
Indianapolis Museum of Art Conservation scientist using a Micro-X-ray fluorescence machine

=== Technological assistance ===
Multiple technologies can be used to assist in examinations including:

- Reflectance transformation imaging, a type of photography that uses digital computation, instead of optical processes, to create new data, as seen with the Penn Museum's Fayum Mummy Portraits.
- X-ray fluorescence, a non-destructive analytical technique used to determine the elemental composition of materials.
- Multispectral imaging, which enables the extraction of information that the human eye fails to capture with its visible receptors for red, green and blue. It was originally developed for military target identification and reconnaissance.
- X-Ray radiography, an imaging technique using X-rays, gamma rays, or similar ionizing radiation and non-ionizing radiation to view the internal form of an object.
- Ultraviolet light, which is used to observe wavelengths shorter than visible light.
- Infra-red reflectography, which is used to observe wavelengths longer than visible light.

These technologies have been employed in the conservation of, for example, Millais's Ophelia. Although Ophelia is not itself a panel painting, it is a valuable demonstration of the technology.

== Treatments ==
Treatments applied to paintings in order to mitigate damage are varied. Treatment consists of any efforts made to stabilize, restore, or repair an object. Panel paintings, being heavily wood-based, may need treatment for pests, weakened structural supports, failed adhesives, temperature and relative humidity damage, general dirt and grime, and more. Documentation of all treatments applied to a panel painting is crucial, as it determines the course of future conservation-restoration efforts. The following treatments are often seen in conservation of panel paintings:

=== Pest management ===
Exposure to pests may cause structural damage to wood panels and supports, and should be eradicated prior to conservation, to ensure the longevity of the object and the effectiveness of conservation efforts. Pest management methods include:

- Isolation through bagging – isolating paintings with blotter paper, paper board, tissue, or foam sealed in a polyethylene bag and monitoring for pests over several weeks or months.
- Low temperature – freezing paintings placed inside a sealed plastic bag at a temperature of -20 °F (-29 °C) for 4 hours.

Overexposure to fluctuations in relative humidity and temperature should be monitored when managing pests, to prevent damage to the painting.

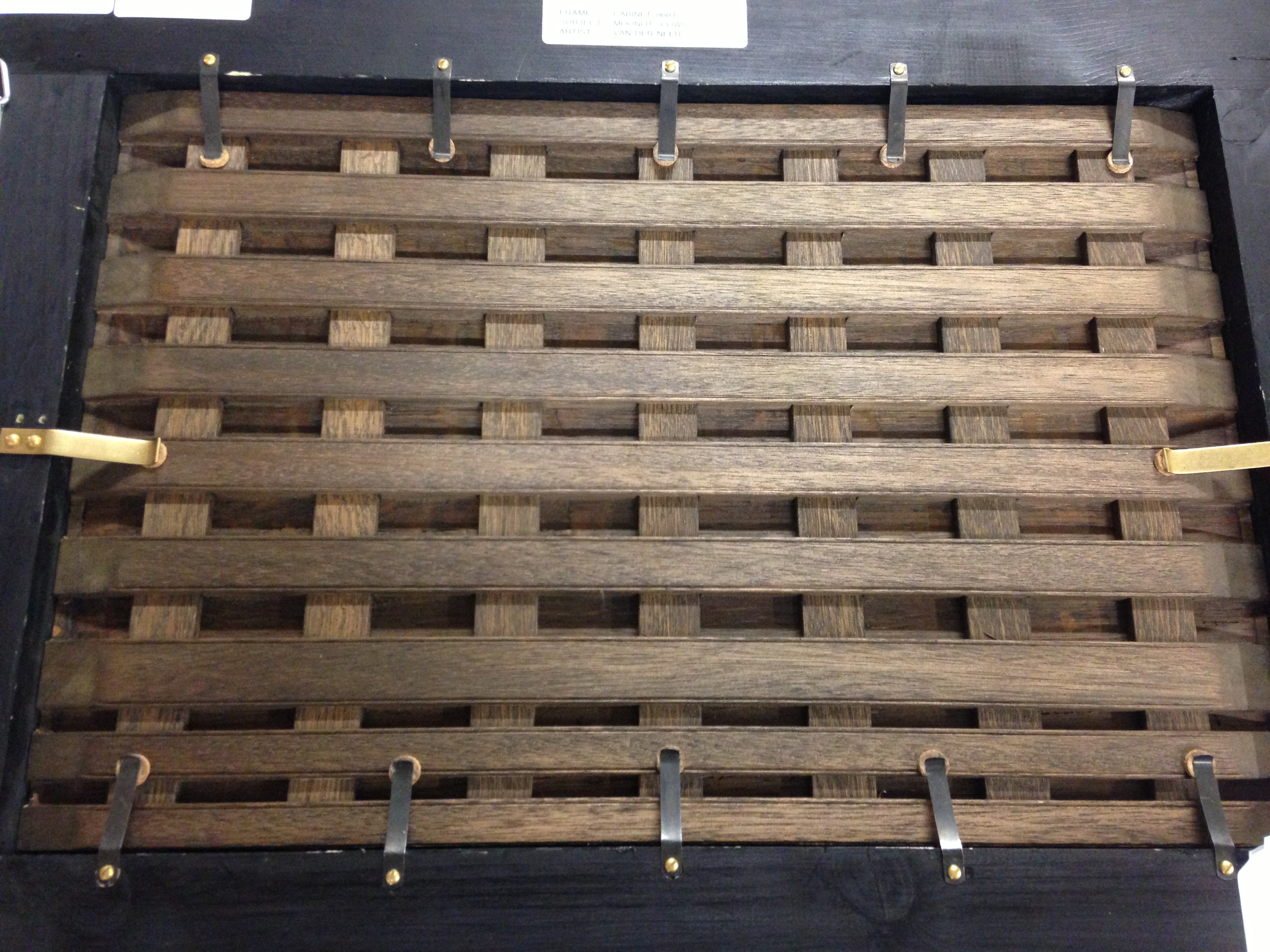
Cradled panel painting, Aert van der Neer

=== Creating supports ===
Each panel undergoing conservation has unique considerations when creating support structures. Conservators must draw upon their experience in formulating treatment plans in order to develop the best treatment plan for each individual panel painting. Two supportive structures commonly used in conservation are:

- Custom strainers, or inner panelings, that are fit to the painting and secured with screws, offering strength to the painting and allowing hanging devices to be attached without damaging a painting.
- Cradling, the addition of wooden supports or frames on the back of paintings. These slats require flexibility to allow for panel movement caused by fluctuations in temperature and humidity. They may prevent warping, as they provide support for the painting.

=== Applying adhesives ===
Cracks, loosened joints, and other such damage to a panel painting, which may be caused by various agents of deterioration, can be treated by applying the proper adhesive. Adhesive treatments include:

- Reactivation of hide glues: hide glues, often made from processed cow hides, are a protein-based adhesive commonly used by conservators, as the glue is known for both its longevity and reversibility. Hide glues may be reactivated with heat, allowing for repairs to be made where glued joints have begun to loosen.
- Adding water-based emulsion glues to existing and failing adhesives: the conservator may choose to add additional adhesives to existing adhesives, depending on the state of the existing adhesive.
- Replacing failed adhesives with new ones: the conservator may choose to replace a failed adhesive entirely. In this case, the conservator must carefully remove the failed adhesive from the area they plan to re-glue. Methods of removal depend on the type of adhesive first used, as well as past treatments. After the original adhesive has been removed, the conservator may carry on with applying a new adhesive.

Types of adhesives include:

- Natural protein adhesives – made of animal products such as casein, albumin, fish glue, and animal-hide glue, these protein adhesives are also referred to as bioadhesives, as they are made from naturally occurring materials and are biodegradable.
- Natural resins – often used in historic objects, natural resins (turpentine, rosin, dragon's blood, etc.) are mainly sourced from trees, in particular coniferous trees such as pines. Other sources include shellac, which is insect-based. Natural resins are not water-soluble, and should be mixed with either oil or spirits, dependent on resin type, before use.
- Synthetic resin adhesives – commonly used synthetic resin adhesives include polyvinyl acetate (PVA), polyvinyl acetate emulsions, Paraloid B-72, cellulose nitrate (also called nitrocellulose), polyvinyl butyral, polymethacrylate emulsions, polyvinyl alcohol, and Elmer's Glue All, although use of the latter is debated amongst conservators. The synthetic resin most commonly used in conservation, polyvinyl acetate (PVA), is used as a glue and a consolidant based upon its viscosity. Higher viscosity glues are considered to have better bonding abilities, while low viscosity PVAs work best as consolidants, given their ability to penetrate an object. PVA beads should be dissolved into a solvent (such as acetone) before use. Conservators should be cautious of applying these adhesives to thin or textile-based panels, as there may be some distortion as the adhesive dries.

=== Transferring panel paintings ===
Transfer of panel paintings from an unstable panel to a new support is considered to be a delicate process. This process occurs when there has been a form of degradation to the original panel, such as pest damage, burrowing, warping, or panel thinning. The transfer should be made to a similarly aged panel, made of the same type of wood. These transfers have become almost obsolete given advances in the conservation field, but were common in Italy into the 1950s. Early efforts to transfer panel paintings were unrefined and lead to distortions in the paintings, but in later years the technique became more refined.

=== Drying ===
The recommended procedure for panels submerged due to flooding is a long drying process prior to any further conservation work. This process should not be rushed, in order to prevent further damage to the panels.

=== Conserving painted surfaces ===
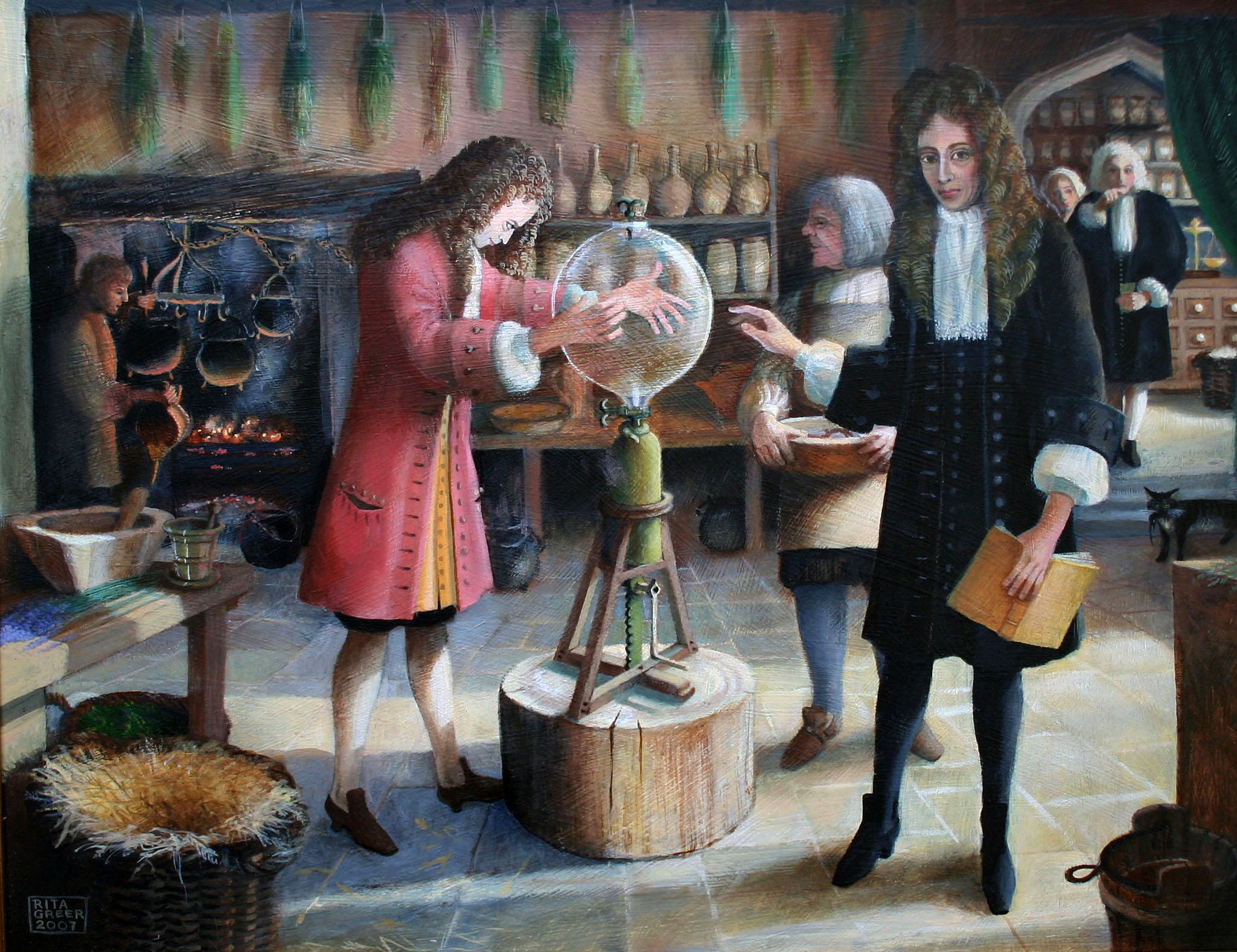
The Scientists by Rita Greer, 2007

The conservation of the surface of a painting varies depending on the materials used in a painting as well as its condition. Generally, conservation of a painted surface includes cleaning, removal and replacement of degraded varnish, and the restoration of paint losses. According to the Tate Museum, "cleaning is a particularly delicate and demanding part of conserving and restoring paintings. Layers of dirt, discolored varnish, and old restorations that may be disfiguring or obscuring parts of the composition are painstakingly removed."

The evolution of modern materials that can be used in panel paintings and their conservation has positively impacted conservation techniques. The Getty Conservation Institute notes that "the introduction of synthetic binders—most notably acrylic, alkyd, polyvinyl acetate, and nitrocellulose—has resulted in paints that exhibit fast drying times, reduced yellowing tendencies, a vast range of appearances and handling properties and, in the case of emulsion formulations, great flexibility and the elimination of organic solvents as thinners and diluents.

== Conservation ethics resources ==
The care and management of cultural heritage materials should be addressed with consideration of the physical and symbolic integrity of the artifact. While the virtues of object integrity may be contested in professional circles, the ultimate goal is preservation. Institutions are governed by their mission statement, and international, federal, and local laws surrounding cultural heritage objects. It is critical that thorough research is conducted, not only on the materials, but also on the ethical and moral implications of handling figuratively and literally valuable artifacts. The following codes address conservation ethics, including the restoration of panel paintings.

=== Examples of codes of ethics ===
- American Institute for Conservation (AIC) and the Foundation for Advancement in Conservation (FAIC)
- The International Journal of Cultural Property published by Cambridge University Press
- The Getty Conservation Institute
- The Victoria And Albert Museum Conservation Journal
- The Midwest Art Conservation Center
