= Cultural property radiography =

Use of radiography on historical objects

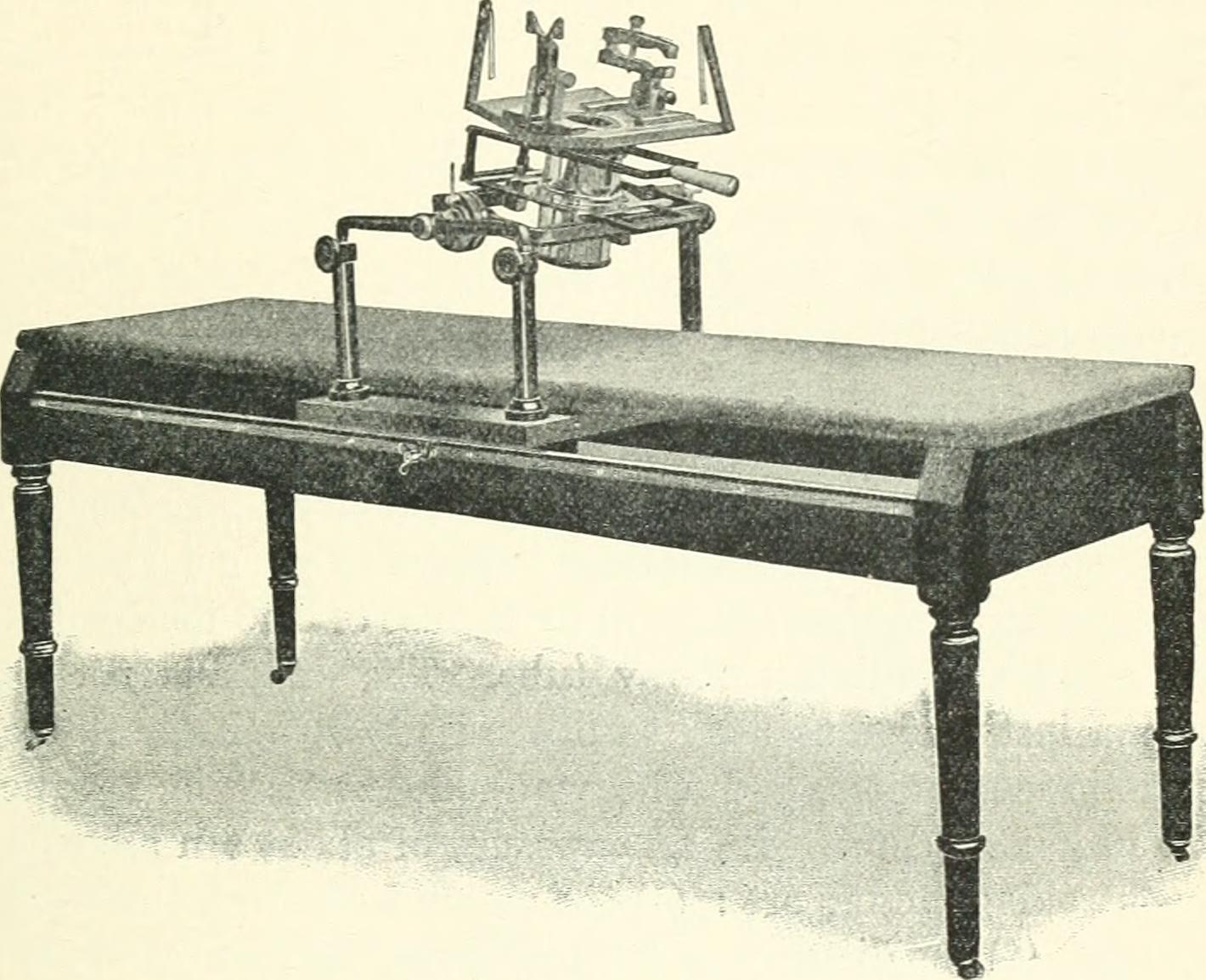
An early unit for producing medical X-radiographs. The set up does not drastically differ for taking X-rays of cultural objects.

The radiography of cultural property is the use of radiography to understand intrinsic details about objects. Most commonly this involves X-rays of paintings to reveal underdrawing, pentimenti alterations in the course of painting or by later restorers, and sometimes previous paintings on the support. Many pigments such as lead white show well in radiographs.

X-ray spectromicroscopy has also been used to analyse the reactions of pigments in paintings. For example, in analysing colour degradation in the paintings of Vincent van Gogh.

These processes can reveal various details about objects that are not visible to the naked eye. This information, which includes structural elements, aids conservators as they assess object condition and consider treatment plans.

For three dimensional objects, the computed tomography (CT) has become a common tool, which when combined with analysis can, for example, "digitally unroll" or unfold and make possible the reading of fragile scrolls, books, or sealed correspondence.

== Use and precautions ==
Infrared and ultraviolet light are also useful tools to understand the intrinsic details of certain objects. However, X-rays tend to be more useful for denser objects. The benefit of radiography is that it is not intrusive. Radiography does expose the object to radiation, but these levels are low. In fact, they are much lower than the radiation levels required for medical X-rays. While technicians and staff conducting the X-ray must use protective gear, the object is not damaged during the process. Furthermore, the use of radiography is widely accepted by conservators, art historians, and archaeologists. Several institutions around the world conduct radiography of objects in their collections including the Victoria & Albert Museum in London, England and the Smithsonian, which operates the Museum Conservation Institute.

== Radiography of paintings ==
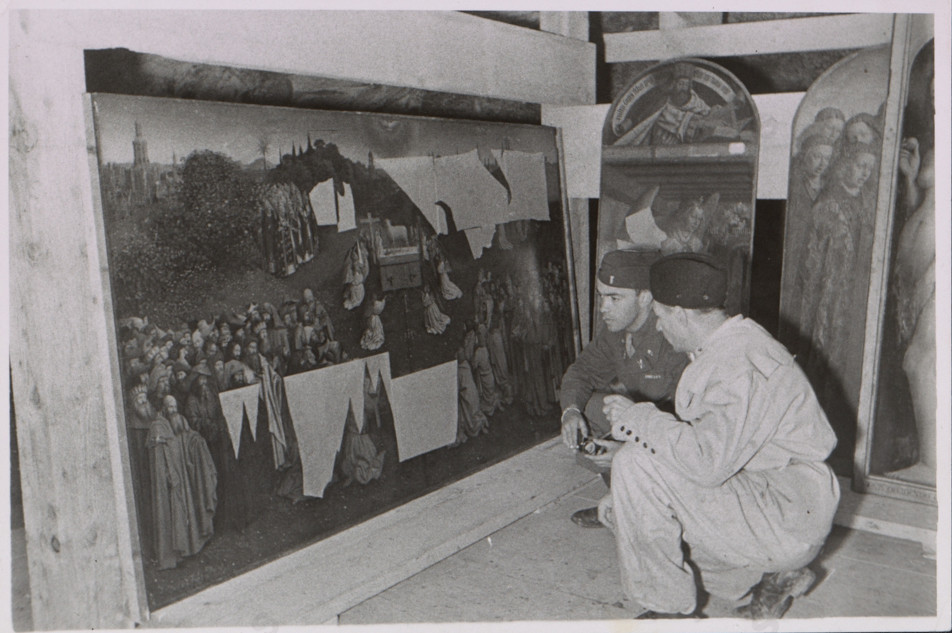
The Ghent Altarpiece at the Altaussee Mine, where it was stored by the Nazis after it was taken from St Bavo's Cathedral, Ghent. It was later recovered by the Monuments Men.

Conservators and art historians have used radiography to uncover technical information about paintings. Compositions of materials, previous alterations, and painting techniques have been revealed in X-rays. This data has also been used to date works and identify forgeries. Diagnostic and therapeutic X-ray systems are generally used to produce X-rays of paintings. Infrared reflectography has also been used to see underdrawings and previous markings on painted canvases.

Paints are produced with a variety of elements. Depending on how much these pigments absorb X-rays affects how clear or opaque they will appear in the radiograph, this is known as X-ray fluorescence. Lead white, for example, will absorb more rays and appear much more opaque on an X-radiograph than carbon black, which will allow most of the X-rays to pass through resulting in a clearer result on the radiograph. To produce a radiograph of a painting, the radiographic film is placed on the painted surface and the X-ray tube is placed behind the canvas.

=== Implementation ===
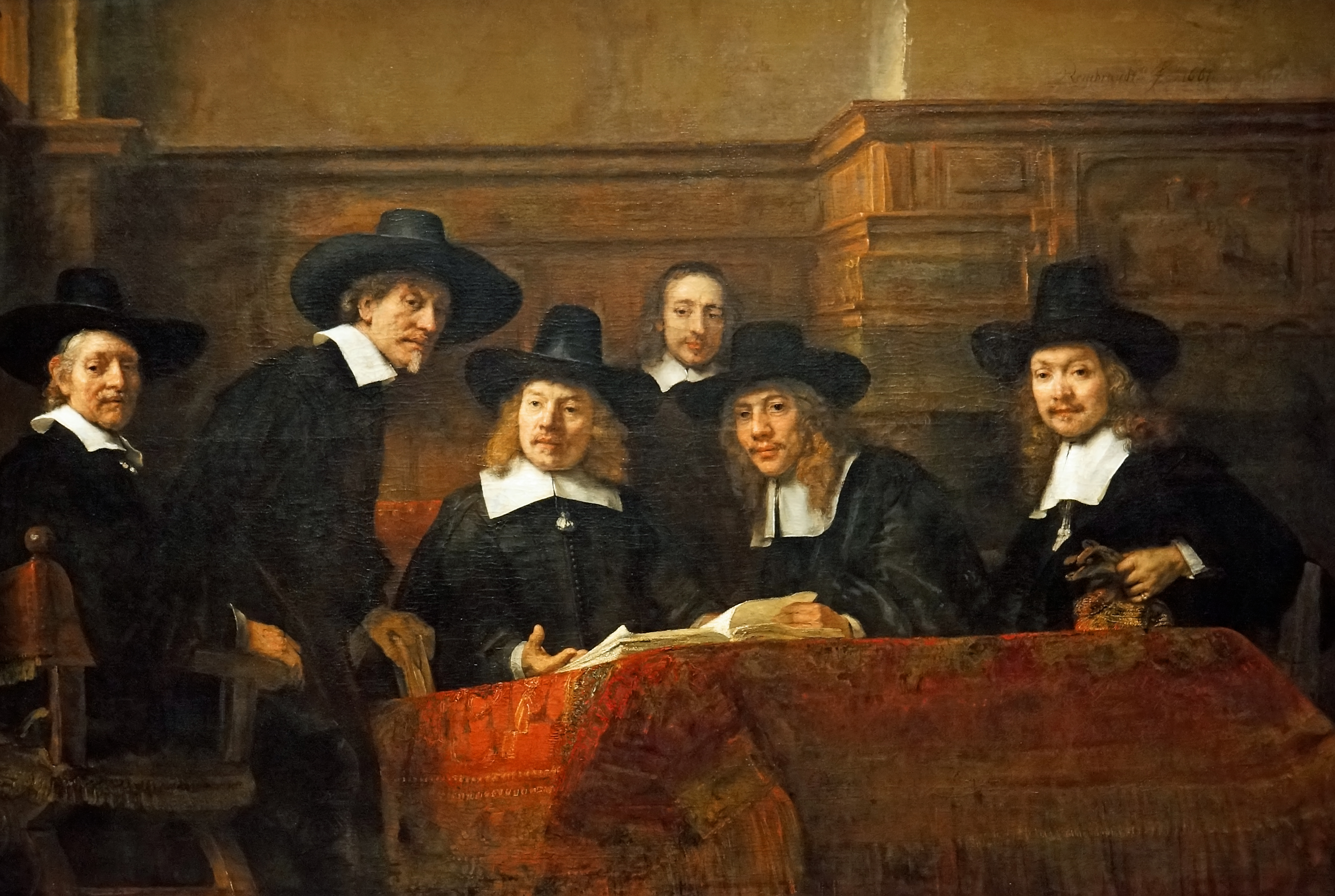
The Syndics of the Drapers' Guild by Rembrandt is in the collection of the Rijksmuseum in Amsterdam.

An X-ray of the Ghent Altarpiece, painted by Jan van Eyck, in Saint Bavo Cathedral in Ghent, Belgium revealed the structure and details of the large altarpiece's painting scheme. The complete radiography of the altarpiece was conducted between 2010 and 2011 as part of a project largely funded by the Getty Institute. The X-rays and other technical information that was gathered were used to prepare conservation treatments.

The Sampling Officials of the Amsterdam Drapers' Guild, also known as the Syndics of the Drapers' Guild or more simply as the Syndics, was painted by Rembrandt in 1662. An X-ray of the painting revealed that Rembrandt fine-tuned the composition several times, alternating the glances between the figures and slightly changing their positions before he settled on that is known today.

X-ray analysis revealed alterations to the paint of a sixteenth century portrait that had been identified as a Bronzino portrait of Eleanor of Toledo at the Carnegie Museum of Art in Pittsburgh, Pennsylvania. After a conservation treatment, which removed the added paint, the subject of the portrait was found to be Isabella de' Medici. The painting was also attributed to Alessandro Allori.

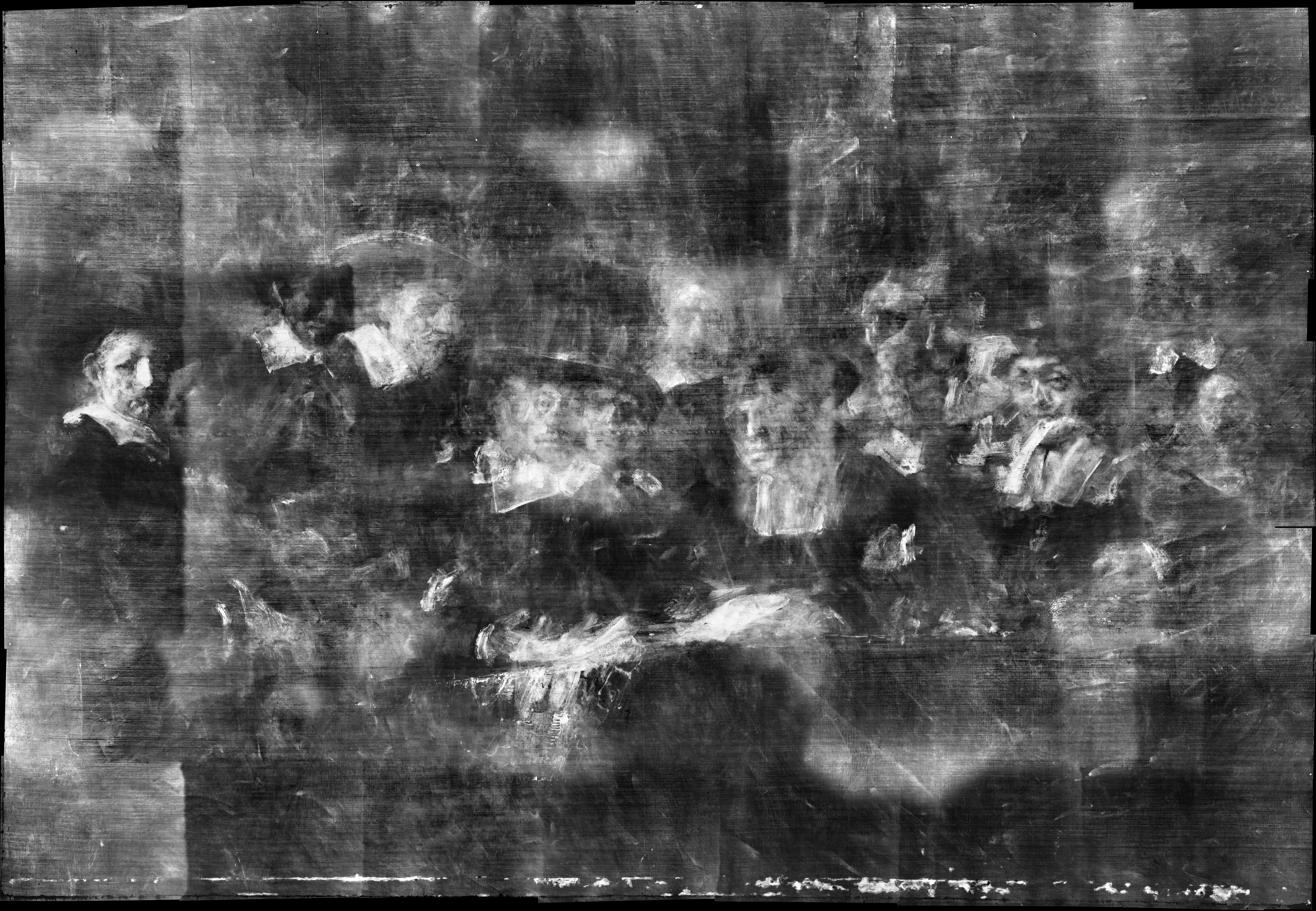
An X-ray of the Syndics reveals Rembrandt's earlier compositions for the group portrait.

Jean-François Millet's The Wood Sawyers at Victoria & Albert Museum was X-rayed, revealing that Millet had reused a canvas to complete this oil painting. The artist not only painted over a previous work, but he had also added strips of canvas to enlarge the painting area.

According to X-rays taken of Twilight by Jean Baptiste Camille Corot, also at the Victoria & Albert Museum, the artist painted over a previous picture that had not even dried yet. Pigments from the lower painting appear through cracks in the surface layer.

The Old Guitarist by Pablo Picasso at the Art Institute of Chicago had been previously examined with visible and ultraviolet light, which had hinted at the possibility of an earlier composition. X-rays of the painting revealed that Picasso had originally painted two female figures behind the guitarist. The X-rays also penetrated far enough to reveal how Picasso had prepared the wooden panel for painting.

== Radiography of sculpture and other three dimensional objects ==
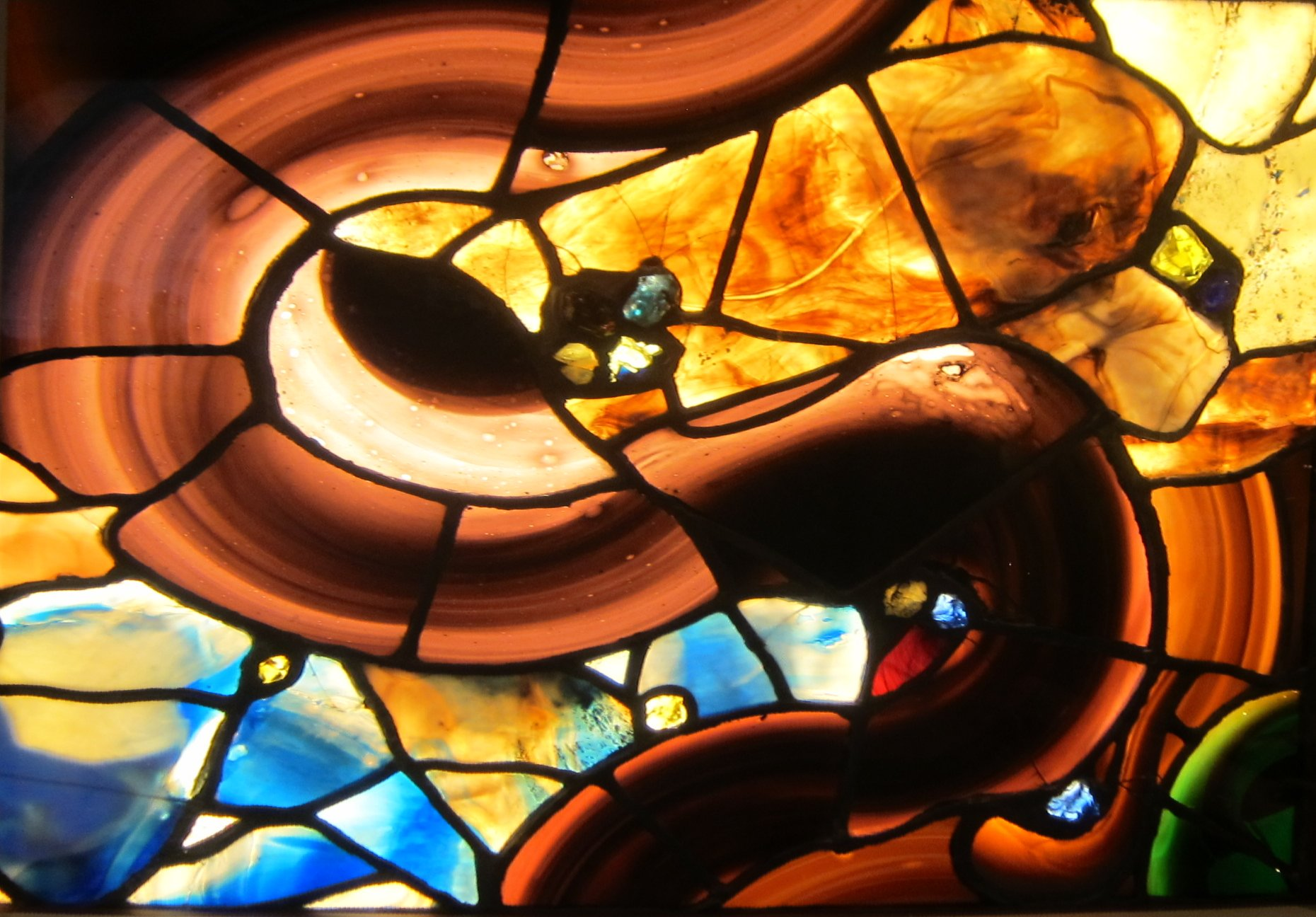
Detail of Tiffany glass

X-rays can provide a better picture of plaster casts and other works that rely on internal supports. However, size and mobility can often affect whether or not radiography is an option for sculptural works. X-rays can also identify cracks and previous repairs to glass and ceramic materials, which is important for assessing the condition. This information can also reveal details about the manufacturing process, which may be instrumental in providing establishing place of manufacture, and possibly also reveal inherent vices that are not visible to the naked eye. Jewelry and other objects with inlaid pieces have been X-rayed to reveal more about their structure.

=== Implementation ===
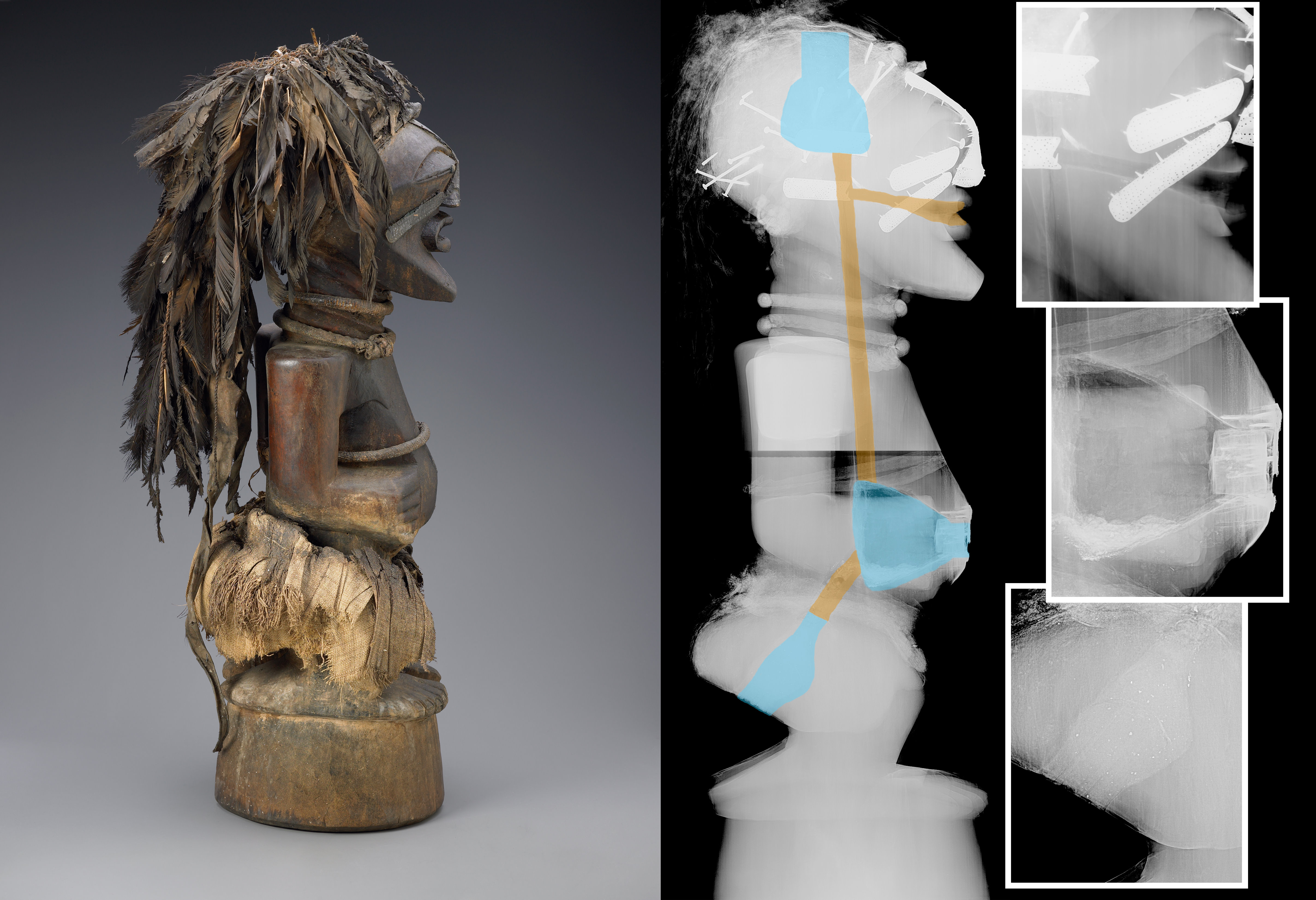
Radiograph of the African Songye Power Figure at the Indianapolis Museum of Art

The plaster cast of Michelangelo's David at the Victoria & Albert Museum was X-rayed revealing that the supports in David's legs were positioned similarly to that of bones in a human leg. The size of this particular piece required a portable machine to complete the X-rays.

The Museum of Applied Arts in Vienna, the Research Centre Seibersdorf, and the New York Historical Society have used X-rays to learn more about the manufacture of Art Nouveau style glass. In particular, they are investigating differences between Tiffany glass of New York and Austria's Loetz glass to learn more about differences in the manufacturing process.

In the X-rays of a wooden power figure at the Indianapolis Museum of Art, conservators discovered that there were hollowed out sections through the center of the sculpture that connected three filled cavities. Information about the network inside of these sculptures has aided curators as they research the function of these pieces. The findings have led to the use of radiography to compare power figures in other collections.

== Radiography of textiles ==
X-rays can reveal information about layers of textiles and stitching patterns. For quilts, for instance, different textile types and other materials are used. These materials are often hidden in the finished quilt. Therefore, X-radiography can provide conservators with useful information. For other textiles X-rays can also provide conservators with information about dyes since metallic mordant has historically been used in the dye making process. Details about stitching patterns can also appear on X-rays. The Victoria & Albert Museum has used X-rays as a tool for several textile conservation projects.

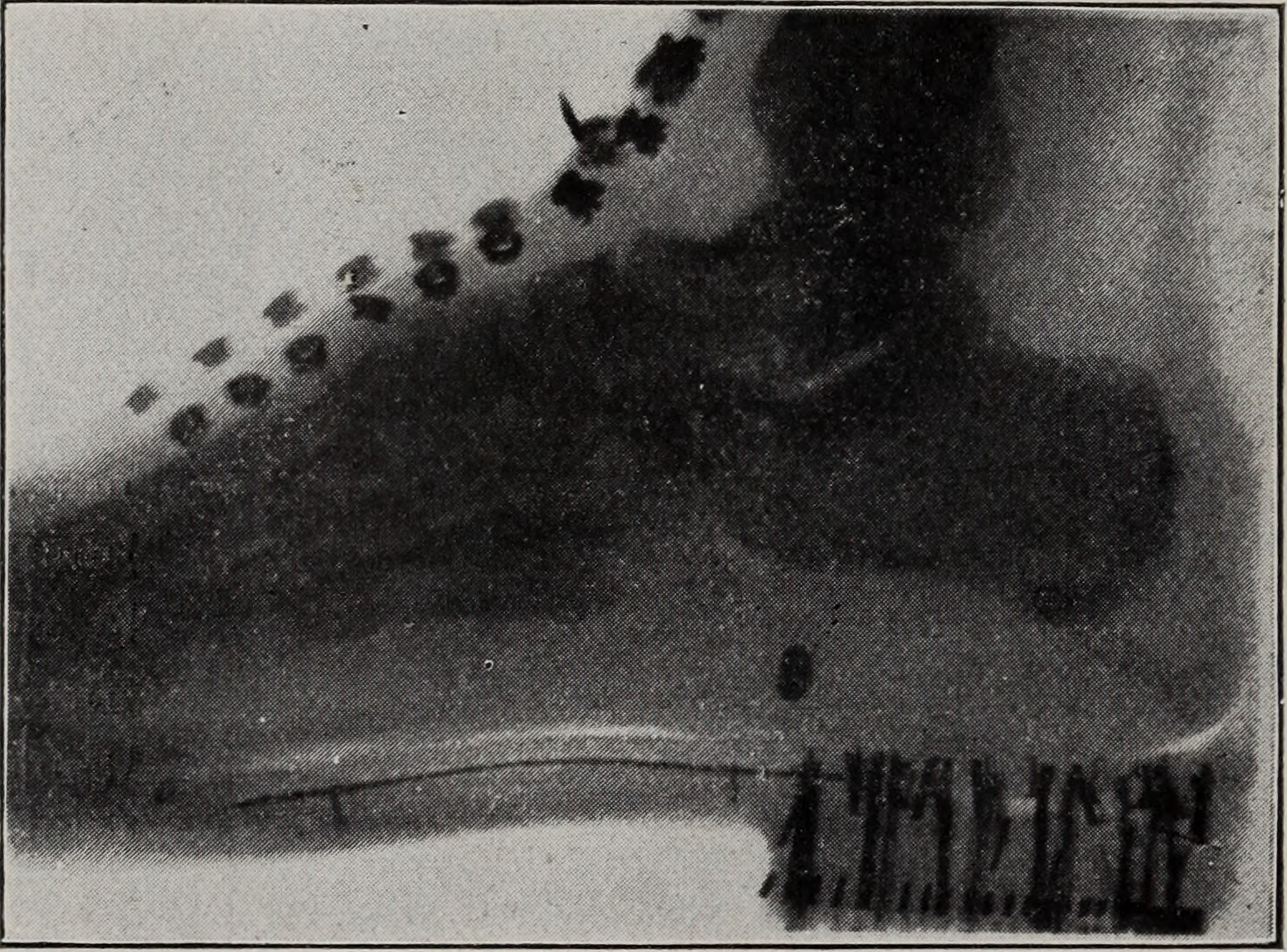
An X-ray of foot inside a shoe

=== Implementation ===
X-rays of the King George III Golden Jubilee Quilt from 1810 revealed concealed stitching patterns and fabric dyes.

Conservators learned more about the complex stitching of the Sundial Coverlet, which dates to 1797, through X-rays.

X-rays were used to understand some of the stains and stitching patterns on an Egyptian tunic, dating to AD 600–799, in the Victoria & Albert collection.

Hidden design and structure details were visible on X-rays of pairs of shoes in the V&A's collection.

== Radiography in archaeology ==
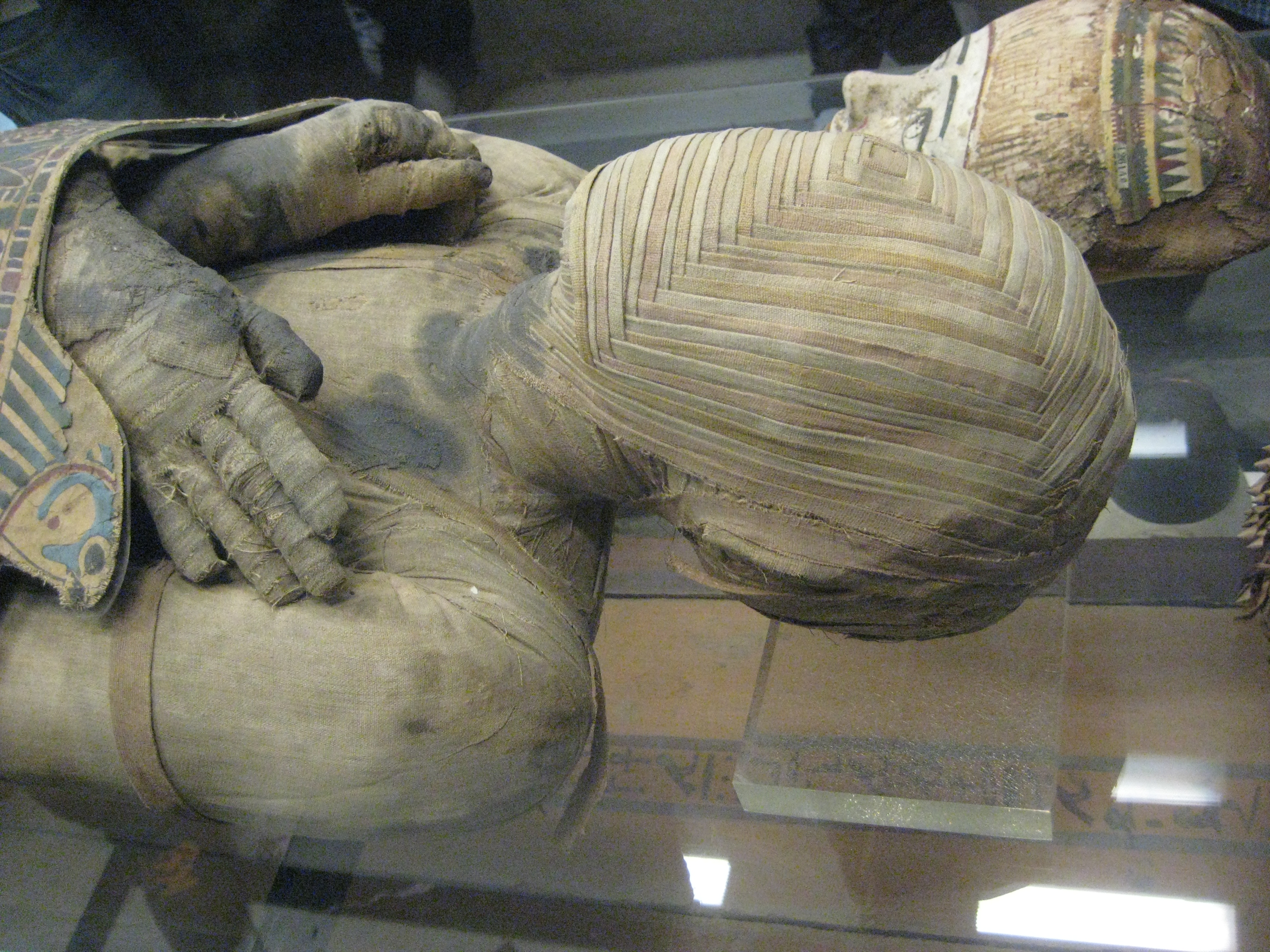
A mummy on display at the Louvre. X-rays provide a non-obtrusive way to research mummies.

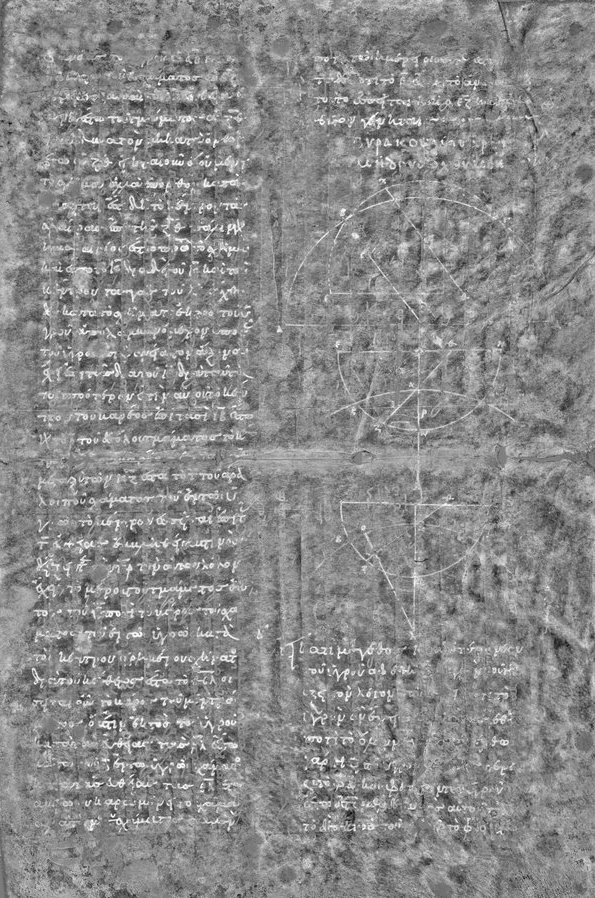
Images of the Archimedes Palimpsest were taken under various lighting conditions to uncover gaps and alterations to the text.

Archaeological materials have also benefited from X-rays. X-rays of soil segments have revealed artifacts that have eroded away, leaving them nearly undetectable to the naked eye. Worn and damaged surfaces, which appear unmarked, have yielded inscriptions or other markings on X-rays. Heavily corroded metal objects have also used X-rays to learn more about their original state. Industrial and medical CT scans have also been used by archaeologists to study a variety of artifacts. Underwater archaeologists have utilized X-rays to see what is beneath layers of concretions.

=== Implementation ===
Radiography has been used with human dry bones to diagnose pathologies, demonstrate trauma and assist age estimation through dentition eruption status.

X-rays have been employed to analyze what is under the wrappings of mummies. In addition to providing images of the bones within, X-rays have revealed the location of jewelry and other objects that were buried with the body without disturbing the wrappings.

The Herculaneum papyri that survived the Vesuvius disaster were excavated and researchers have used X-rays to read their contents. Previous methods involved slowly unrolling the papyrus, which damaged much of the scrolls, some beyond repair.

X-ray technology was used to quickly identify individual coins uncovered in a single container. Researchers did not have to wait for slower, traditional conservation methods to separate and decipher the coins.

X-rays were among the imaging techniques used to uncover lost text on the Archimedes Palimpsest, which is in the collection of the Walters Museum in Baltimore, Maryland. The museum spearheaded an extensive research project on the palimpsest that employed various imaging techniques including ultraviolet, infrared, and X-radiography.

The heavily corroded Antikythera mechanism, which was uncovered from a shipwreck at the beginning of the 20th century, has been X-rayed several times in an effort to understand how it works.
