= Inherent vice =

Entropic deterioration of objects

Inherent vice is the tendency in physical objects to deteriorate because of the fundamental instability of the components of which they are made, as opposed to deterioration caused by external forces. All objects have some kind of inherent vice as a result of the baseline law of entropy.

== Preservation issues ==
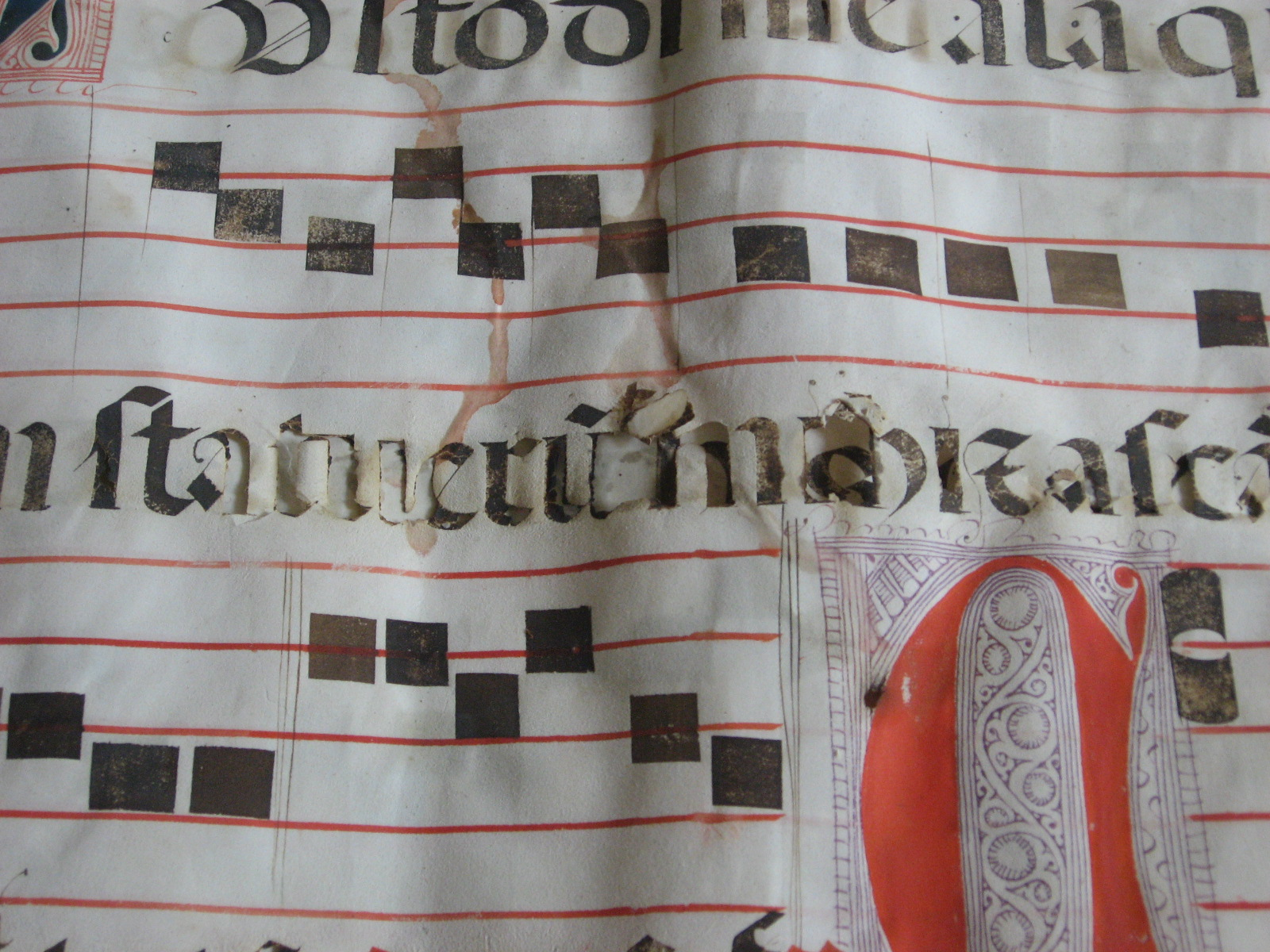
An example of inherent vice: the iron gall ink used in this manuscript (from Igreja de São Francisco, Évora, Portugal) has oxidized the cellulose, causing the paper to disintegrate.

The term is broadly used in archival practice to recognize the material constraints of preservation activities. For example, many kinds of paper have acid in them that makes them chemically unstable. Over time, the acid will eat away the text on the page and cause paper to turn yellow or brown and become brittle. As the acid continues to break down the cellulose fibers, the paper disintegrates. In the world of philately, the adhesive on the back of stamps is both an inherent vice—any exposure to moisture will compromise their ability to be preserved—as well as the purpose for which the stamps were made. In the case of film, an example of inherent vice is the innate chemical instability of cellulose acetate film, which can result in the degradation known as "vinegar syndrome" due to the distinctive vinegar odor it produces.

Slowing this tendency of objects to self-destruct requires an understanding of how materials interact. This includes not just an understanding of the intrinsic qualities of the materials themselves, but also the way that they affect and are affected by the other materials that they come into contact with. For example, leather and metal are two materials which are frequently used in combination with each other, but react to each other over time to cause corrosion on the metal.

The presence of deteriorating agents is a problem which can be tempered by selecting archival quality materials, such as acid free paper. However, frequently the objective of manufacturers is to make a process (i.e. papermaking, book binding, etc.) faster and easier; the longevity of the items they produce is not their primary concern.

== Legal definition ==
The term inherent vice is used in law as well as in library and archival science. One legal definition of inherent vice is "an exclusion found in most property insurance policies eliminating coverage for loss caused by a quality in property that causes it to damage or destroy itself."

Inherent vice can be used as a justification for refusing to insure an item, as its intrinsically self-destructive nature may make it unacceptable risk to a carrier or insurer.
