= Conservation and restoration of paintings =

Preservation of heritage collections

Painting undergoing restoration

The conservation and restoration of paintings is carried out by professional painting conservators. Paintings cover a wide range of various mediums, materials, and their supports (i.e. the painted surface made from fabric, paper, wood panel, fabricated board, or other). Painting types include fine art to decorative and functional objects spanning from acrylics, frescoes, and oil paint on various surfaces, egg tempera on panels and canvas, lacquer painting, water color and more. Knowing the materials of any given painting and its support allows for the proper restoration and conservation practices. All components of a painting will react to its environment differently, and impact the artwork as a whole. These material components along with collections care (also known as preventive conservation) will determine the longevity of a painting. The first steps to conservation and restoration is preventive conservation followed by active restoration with the artist's intent in mind.

== Basic care ==
Typical, traditional oil, acrylic, and many other types of paintings are made up of various different types of materials, from their paint layers to the materials that make up their supports. Each of these materials requires specific care in handling, displaying, storage, added protective measures, and general environmental conditions. Providing the proper care to each of these materials ensures that the overall condition of the painting is protected.

=== Backing boards ===
Using good protective measures such as attaching a rigid backing to a painting on canvas provides several protections. It reduces the effects of rapid changes in relative humidity around the painting, provides some protection from pressure or direct contact against the canvas back, and protects from vibrations caused by handling or moving. Backing boards also serve to protect from dust and dirt, cracks and deformations from handling, and insect activity. Some of the most commonly used types of backing boards include foam core, heritage board, matboard, cardboard/millboard, coroplast, corrugated plastic sheets, acrylic sheeting, mylar, and fabric.

=== Framing ===
The frames around paintings are not just for aesthetic appearances. Frames are also used to protect the more sensitive parts of a painting when handled by hand, and they reduce the potential for damage if the painting is dropped. There are also specialists that work on the conservation and restoration of painting frames.

=== Handling and moving ===
The movement of objects places an object at a much greater risk of damage than when it is on display or in storage. Certain techniques and equipment are used any time an art work needs to be transported. These techniques and equipment include using padding lifts and dollies, moving small, fragile objects on carts instead of carrying by hand; lifting objects from underneath by their sturdiest part; and taking extra time and care when on ladders or stairs. In many cases gloves are worn to protect the art work from any dirt or oil that may be on a conservator or object handlers hands. When handling canvas paintings specifically, never presume that the frame is stable and firmly attached. Do not lift or carry a painting by its stretcher bar, or insert your fingers between the stretcher bar and the canvas

=== Display and storage ===
It is estimated that a lack of proper routine maintenance and care is responsible for 95 percent of conservation treatments; the remaining 5 percent results from mishandling objects When developing display and storage methods for works of art, issues regarding relative humidity, temperature, light, pollutants, and pests need to be considered. Location and the types of storage units must be considered as well. Storage areas should be located in areas away from pipes and heating systems, as well as out of areas that are likely to flood and collect dust and dirt. Storage units should be sturdy, adjustable for collections growth so all collections sizes are safely stored, made of materials that will not cause any damage to the paintings (i.e. metal racks), and be free of any hardware or supports that stick out.

== Causes of deterioration ==
Damage from label on back of painting

Moisture, heat, light, pollutants, and pests can slowly or suddenly cause damage to a painting. A non-comprehensive list of agents of deterioration impact all of the components that make up a painting in various ways includes:

- Accidents
- Acts of vandalism / defacing / iconoclasty - People have damaged or destroyed artwork during war and peacetime. For example, during the Iraqi invasion of Kuwait, Saddam Hussein damaged buildings and artwork. Another example is the destruction of paintings by political activists.
- Inherent chemical degradations / Materials obsolescence and incompatibility
- Mold
- Relative humidity and temperature - Too low or too high relative humidity (RH) as well as rapid changes in relative humidity can be damaging to paintings. According to the Canadian Conservation Institute, there are four types of incorrect relative humidity: dampness over 75% RH, RH above or below a critical value for that object, RH above 0%, and RH fluctuations. "Generally accepted temperature and relative humidity standards for most museum objects and artifacts are 65°–70°F (18°–21°C) at 47%–55% RH." The best method of controlling the environment is by using a centralized climate control or HVAC system where incoming air is washed, cleaned, heated, or cooled, adjusted to specific conditions, and then injected into the storage space. An appropriate alternative is a localized climate control system where air conditioners cool the air and absorb some of its moisture while filtering out gross particles. They do not condition the air, nor do they filter air pollutants.
- Light - Both visible and ultraviolet light can cause damage to paintings. In particular, organic materials such as paper, fabric, wood, leather, and colored surfaces. "Fugitive dyes and colorants used in paints will eventually discolor under exposure to ultraviolet light. The fading of pigments and dyes in paintings will affect the color balance of the image." Damage from natural and artificial light exposure can be mitigated by displaying paintings out of direct sunlight, use of blinds, shades, curtains, or shudders, filters on nearby windows, installing dimmers and appropriate wattage light bulbs, and displaying paintings a safe distance from a light source to limit heat exposure
- Airborne pollutants - originate from atmospheric sources (ozone, hydrogen sulfide, sulfur dioxide, soot, salts), or emissive products, objects, and people (sulfur-based gases, organic acids, lint, and dander). Their effects can include acidification of papers, corrosion of metals, discoloration of colorants, and efflorescence of calcium-based objects.
- Pollutants transferred by contact - plasticizer from PVC, sulfur compounds from natural rubber, staining materials from wood, viscous compounds from old polyurethane foams, fatty acids from people or from greasy objects, and impregnation of residue of cleaning agents. The effects of these pollutants can include discoloration or corrosion of a paintings surface.
- Intrinsic pollutants - composite objects that have compounds that are harmful to other parts of an object. The effects of these pollutants includes deterioration of the object, acidification, discoloration or staining on an object, speed up degradation processes caused by oxygen, water vapor, or other pollutants.
- Pests such as rodents and insects - they have the potential to cause considerable damage to works of art. Preventive measures that may be taken to protect paintings from pests include upgrading building structures to obstruct pest entry, installing better cabinetry with good seals, better control of temperature and humidity in collections and storage areas, keeping food and other organic materials from collection areas, and treatment of outbreaks. Materials that are commonly damaged by pests include: natural fibers, wood, paper, starch adhesives, and egg tempera.

== Recommended environmental conditions and potential damage ==
| Materials | Recommended Relative Humidity Levels | Potential Damage | Recommended Light Levels | Potential Damage | Recommended Temperature Levels | Potential Damage |
|---|---|---|---|---|---|---|
| Acrylic | 40–60% | Low humidity causes warping and splits, and high humidity causes wrapping, sagging, and buckling | max 50 Lux | Permanent changes in pigment, dry paint out, and create cracks and paint flakes | 65 °F–70 °F | High temperatures soften a painting and allow dirt to stick to surface. Low temperatures cause paintings to become brittle. |
| Canvas | 50 ± 10% | Collects dust easily | max 200 lux | | 68 °F ± 2° | Collects dust easily |
| Ceramics | 50% ± 5% | May result in weeping and crizzling or | max 300 | Some types of glass may turn purple from solarization | 68 °F ± 3° | Causes expansion and contraction possibly resulting in breaking or crack. |
| Cloth/Textiles | 40–50% | Mold and mildew, increased insect activity | max 50 lux | faded fabric dyes, fabric becomes brittle | 55 °F–68 °F | Thermal degradation |
| Enamel | 50 ± 10% | High temperature sensitive | max 300 lux | Too much light creates heat and causes damage | 68 °F ± 2° | High temperature sensitive |
| Encaustic | 50 ± 5% | Thermoplastic or embrittlement | max 200 lux | create too much or too little heat and cause distortion or embrittlement | 68 °F ± 2° | Thermoplastic or embrittlement |
| Glass | 50% ± 5% or 40–45% for weeping glass | Cleavage and flaking of paint | max 300 lux | Not generally sensitive to light, but paint layer may be impacted | 68 °F ± 3° | Chemical and physical deterioration can be worsened by fluctuations in temperature |
| Ivory | 35–55% | High humidity causes warping, splitting, buckling, or dimples. Low humidity causes the ivory to become brittle | max 50 lux | Fade in pigment colors | 65 °F–70 °F | Warping and cracking, paint flake |
| Lacquer Paintings | 55–60% | Degradation by oxygen, shrinkage, and internal stress Blanching, whitening, and formation of salts | max 150 lux | Fading and discoloration | 68 °F | Changes in color on the lacquer surface, loss flexibility and toughness |
| Metal | 40–50% | The lower the RH the less chance of corrosion, but paint may become brittle | max 300 lux | Increased heat from light creates paint soften | 68 °F ± 2° | High temperature softens paint. low temperature causes brittle paint. |
| Oil Paint | 40–45% or 45–45% | Expansion and contraction of painting, wood and fabric absorb moisture or shrink, paint cracks and flakes, or sags | max 200 lux | Fading or darkening of painting | 65 °F–70 °F or 70 °F–75 °F | Expansion and contraction of painting |
| Pastels | 50 ± 10% | | max 50 lux | Example | 68 °F ± 2° | |
| Paper | 40–50% | Discoloration, planar distortion, cockling, microbiological attacks, increased presence of insects | max 50 lux | Discoloration, faded pigments | 68 °F–70 °F | Cellulose breakdown, decreases life expectancy. |
| Scroll/Screen Paintings | 50–60% | Mold, physical distortion, and embrittlement | max 50 lux | fade in colors, physical deterioration of silk and other organic materials | 65–70 °F | Physical distortion and embrittlement |
| Watercolors & Gouache | 50 ± 5% | Binder in paint can become friable | max 50 lux | Color fade and discoloration | 68 °F ± 2° | Deterioration of binder |
| Wood | 45–50% | Warping, cracking, shrinkage, swelling | max 200 lux | High light levels can increase temperature causing warping, cracking, and shrinkage | 20 °F ± 2° | Warping, cracking, shrinkage, swelling |

== Painting mediums and preventive conservation ==
=== Acrylic paintings ===
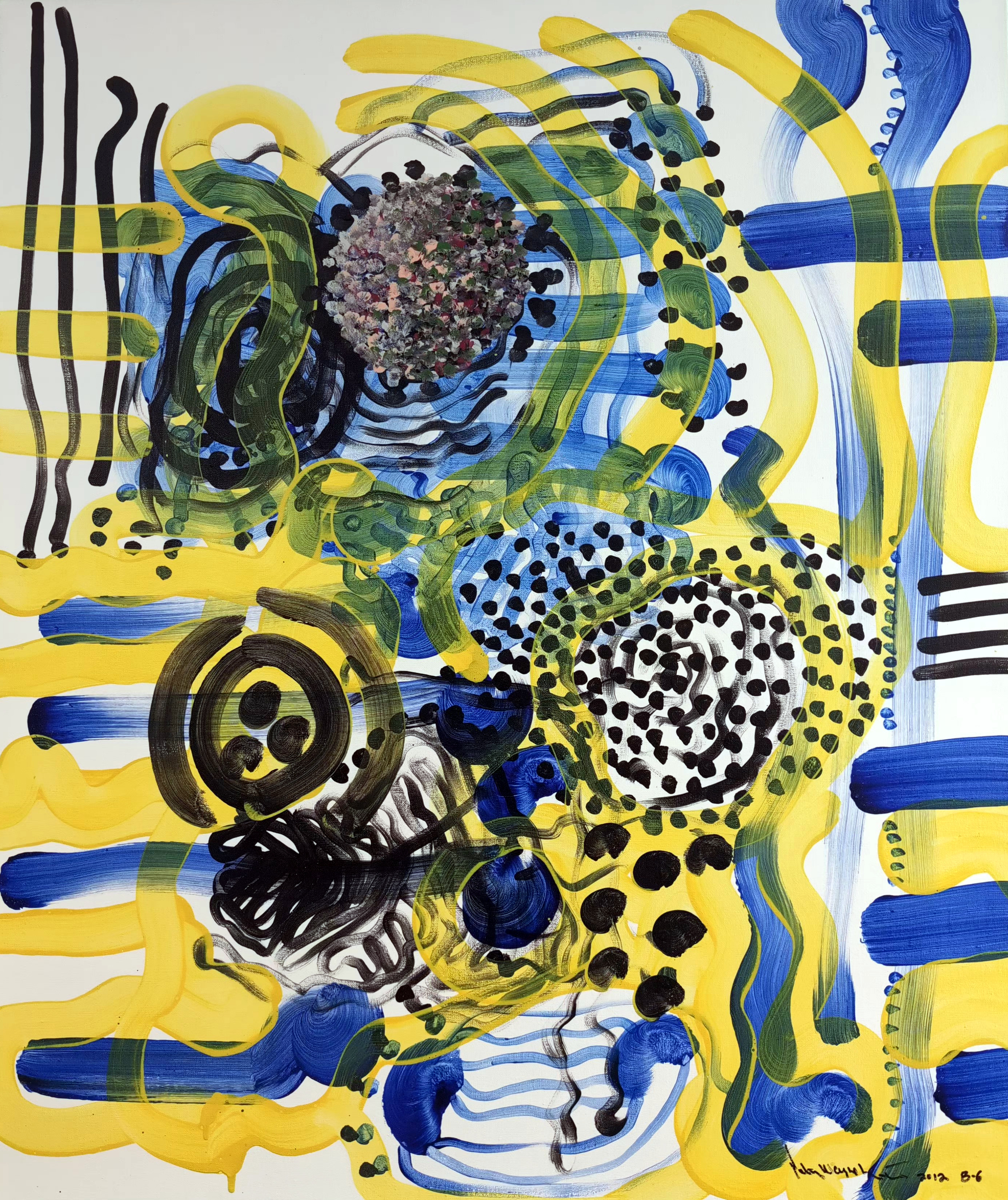
Buddha Plays Monk #6 (single) by Peter Wayne Lewis. Acrylic on linen.

Acrylic paintings were introduced in the 1950s and the material differs from oil paint in chemical and physical properties. There are two types of acrylic paints used in acrylic paintings. There is solvent-based and water-based. Solvent-based acrylic paints are soluble in mineral spirits, and water-based acrylic paints are water-soluble. Acrylic paint differs from oil paint in both its quick drying time, and how the paint dries. Acrylic paint dries in as little as thirty minutes, and dries by the evaporation of the solvent or water.

Preventive conservation

Acrylic paintings require attentive preventive care. Due to the soft nature of the paint, it attracts and holds dirt and debris, creating difficulty when cleaning and resulting in darkening colors over time. Due to the characteristic of acrylic paint, varnishes will diminish top layers of the paint and affect the colors' vibrancy. Storage of acrylic paintings should be clean and free of dust and heat – below room temperature is best as it will reduce further softening of the top layer of the paint. Exposing acrylic paintings to temperatures ranging near sub zero will cause damaging cracking. Acrylic paint is highly susceptible to mold growth. This is a growing concern for artists and conservators as removal causes some degree of damage to the original paint.

Conservation and restoration methods

Preventive care was thought to be the best method of conservation. However, after more than a decade of investigation, conservators now better understand the risks of swelling, extraction, and gloss changes that are associated with surface cleaning treatments. Wet cleaning systems are being developed to help minimize the risks associated with cleaning acrylic paints.

=== Blacklight or fluorescent/luminous paintings ===
Blacklight or luminous paint is typically made up of fluorescent dyes mixed into paint. These dyes are not a typical dye, but rather a pigment that is suspended in a carrier or resin. This pigment is what gives off a glow when exposed to ultraviolet light. This glow or light is created by the energy that is released from the pigment. While the fluorescent paint layers reflect light, the paint layer darkens over time and decreases in fluorescence.

Preventive conservation

The intensity of fluorescent paints can decline quite rapidly, making it difficult for conservators to care for. This is because the brightening agent that is mixed into the paint is not stable. Some fluorescent paintings can only be displayed in the dark with UV-lights. These requirements can make choosing appropriate lighting and exhibition and storage space for preventive conservation challenging. For fluorescent paintings that are displayed in dark rooms with UV lights, it is recommended to have an automatic lighting system.

Conservation and restoration methods

Conserving . The age of the fluorescent pigments must be determined in order to develop a close matching pigment use for retouching. A painting can lose its effect under UV-light if the retouches and fillings are not closely matched and are too light or too dark.

=== Egg tempera ===
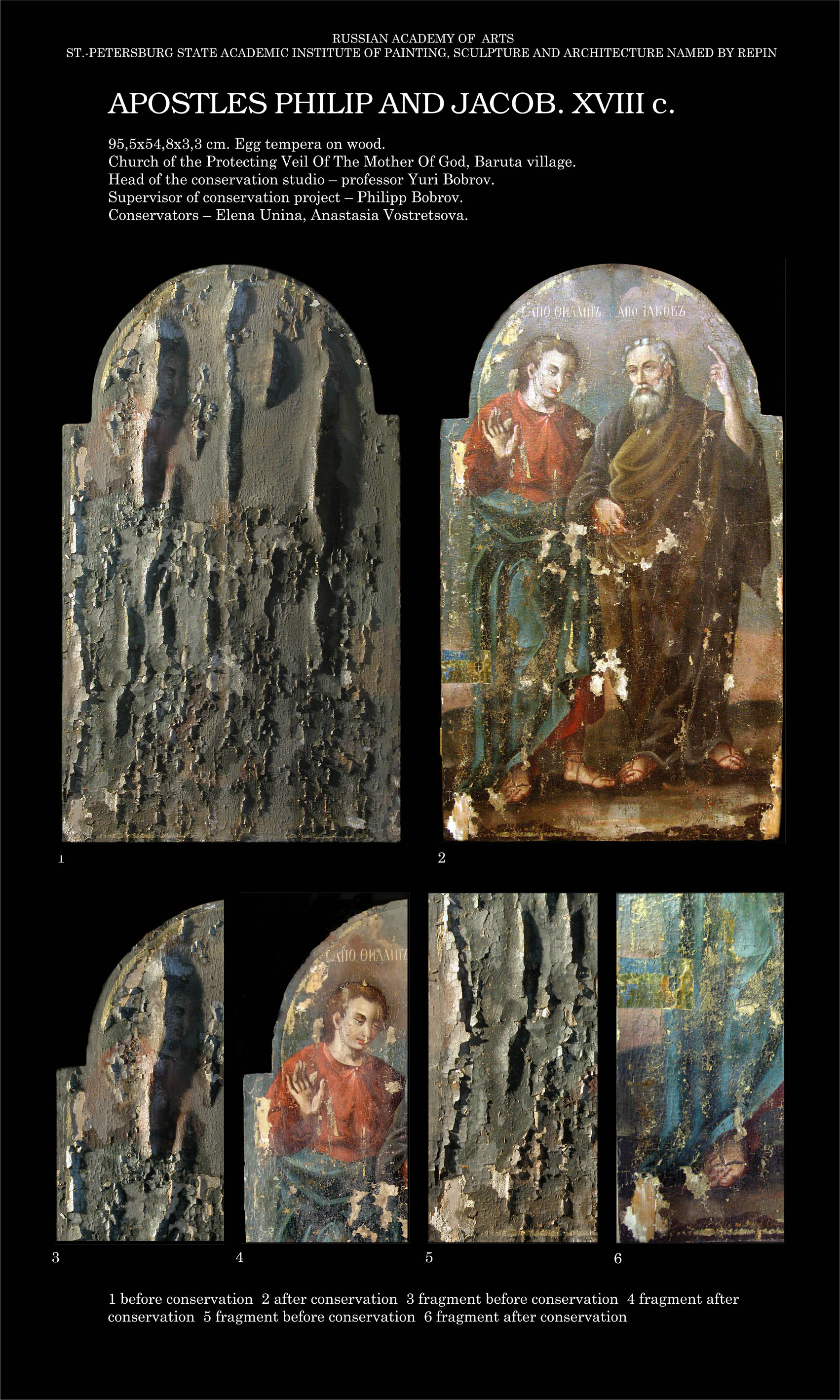
Apostles Philip and Jacob. XVIII c. Egg tempera on wood. Before and conservation.

Egg tempera is made up of egg yolk, water, and pigment. These ingredients are mixed together to create a thick paste that dries quickly, but can take six to twelve months before it completely cures. Egg Tempera's fast drying property makes it difficult to correct or revise.

Preventive conservation

Tempera paintings have many of the same problems of condition and conservation as other painting mediums. These include changes in the work due to unstable and fugitive pigments. The aging of a paintings supports and ground will also impact the paint layer. For example, cracks can form in a gesso ground due to the embrittlement and movement of its support, then become visible in the paint film. Tempera can develop cracks over time that are visible to the naked eye, and flaking caused by air bubbles. Tempera paintings are thought to be more resistant to materials typically used during cleanings. However, they are susceptible to abrasions from routine dusting, washings, and removal of old varnish layers.

Conservation and restoration methods

The paint surfaces of many tempera paintings have become abraded, most likely from routine dusting and cleanings. It is unclear how tempera paintings were originally varnished due to the need for sensitive methods of analysis. Modern tempera paintings are almost always unvarnished and more prone to mold attacks.

=== Enamel ===
Enamel paints, not to be confused with vitreous enamel, are nitro-cellulose based paints originally designed for commercial use, but have also been used in artist's paintings such as Jackson Pollock and Pablo Picasso. Enamel paints are oil, latex, alkyd, and water based. This paint dries rapidly and has a glossy finish once dry.

Preventive conservation

Like all painting mediums, enamel is subject to damage from improper handling and environmental stressors. Jackson Pollock's Mural for example was subjected to several moves, likely having been rolled and unrolled each time. These moves may have taken a toll on its condition. The paint flaked, and the original stretcher weakened causing the painting to have a noticeable sag. Another of Jackson Pollock's paintings, Echo, endured yellowing at the top of the canvas due to strong museum display lights.

Conservation and restoration methods

Conservation treatments can take the form of adhering a lining to the canvas with wax-resin to the reverse side, replacing the painting's original stretcher, and varnishing the painting. In Jackson Pollock's Echo, solvents were used to remove a thin layer of the canvas to even out the work's coloring.

=== Encaustic ===
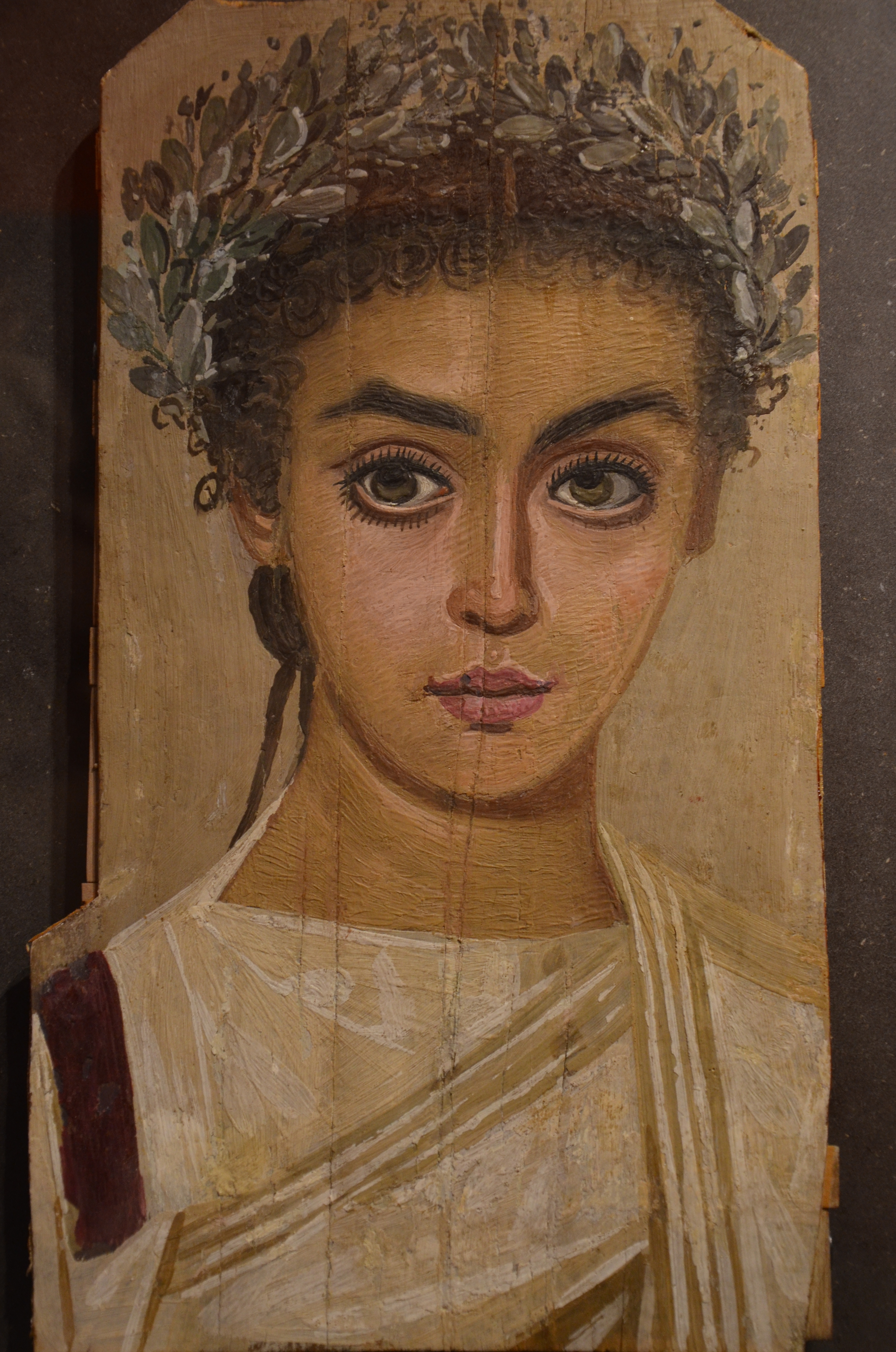
Mummy portrait of a girl, AD 120–150, Roman Egypt, wax encaustic painting on sycamore wood

Encaustic is a method of painting that involves dry pigments mixed with hot beeswax, then applied to the surface of a support such as wood or canvas. A completed painting is then finished by taking a source of heat to reheat the surface and fuse it together. Encaustic paintings do not require a varnish, are resistant to moisture, and do not yellow.

Preventive conservation

Encaustic paintings are considered very durable. However, the waxes used in encaustic paints can soften or melt above certain temperatures. This may cause the upper layers to slide or detach and cause irreversible damage. Controlling the light, temperature, and humidity levels can prevent this type of damage from occurring.

Conservation and restoration methods

Surface cleaning on encaustic paintings can typically be done with distilled water and swabs is sufficient. For more challenging cleanings, solutions made of beeswax and carbon tetrachloride can be used. One of the biggest challenges in treating encaustic paintings is identifying the different waxes used to determine the appropriate treatments. Infra-red photography and gas chromatography can be used to identify the various types of waxes.

=== Frescos ===
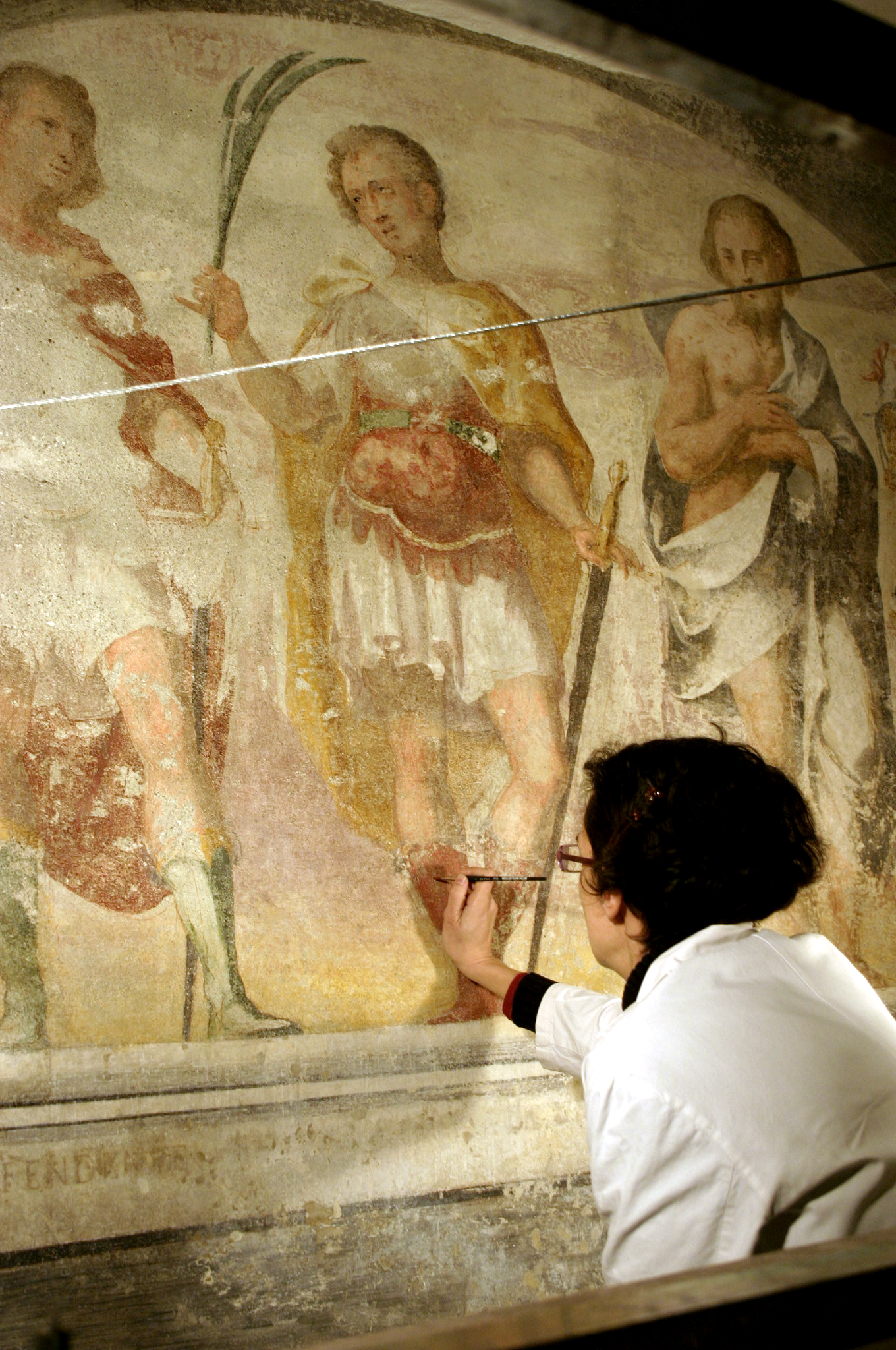
A restorer filling the gaps of the damaged frescos in the crypt of Saint Eustorgio church in Milan, Italy

Frescos are types of mural paintings where the pigment is painted directly into a fresh lime mortar surface. These types of paintings are susceptible to damage from vandalism, time, environmental stressors, and climate changes. Frescos, like most works of cultural heritage, have specific climate parameters for preservation. Humidity and water damage cause mold to develop. The mold Aspergillus versicolor can grow on frescos and consume nutrients effectively causing pigment discoloration and wall detachment from rot.

Preventive conservation

Ideally, buildings with frescos would be outfitted with central air with humidity adjusting features to keep the paintings in a cool and dry environment with low humidity. Frescos can be found typically in old churches and other ancient structures such as temples and tombs. These types of structures can be limited with additional means like environmental controls. Deterioration of frescos can be caused by environmental pollutants. These pollutants can be physical, chemical, or biological. The many layers can deteriorate from the materials chemical compositions reacting to pollutants or environmental conditions such as humidity, temperature, light, and pH.

Chemical Degradation – Evident with pigment discoloration, stains, and the presence of biofilm.

Physical Degradation – Evident with cracking of layers.

Conservation and restoration methods

Frescos can be repaired by methods of detaching sections of the fresco. Surface repairs for frescos can be less invasive. Conservators can remedy cracks and minor detachments of frescos with injections of epoxy resin containing micronized silica and lime putty.

=== Lacquer ===
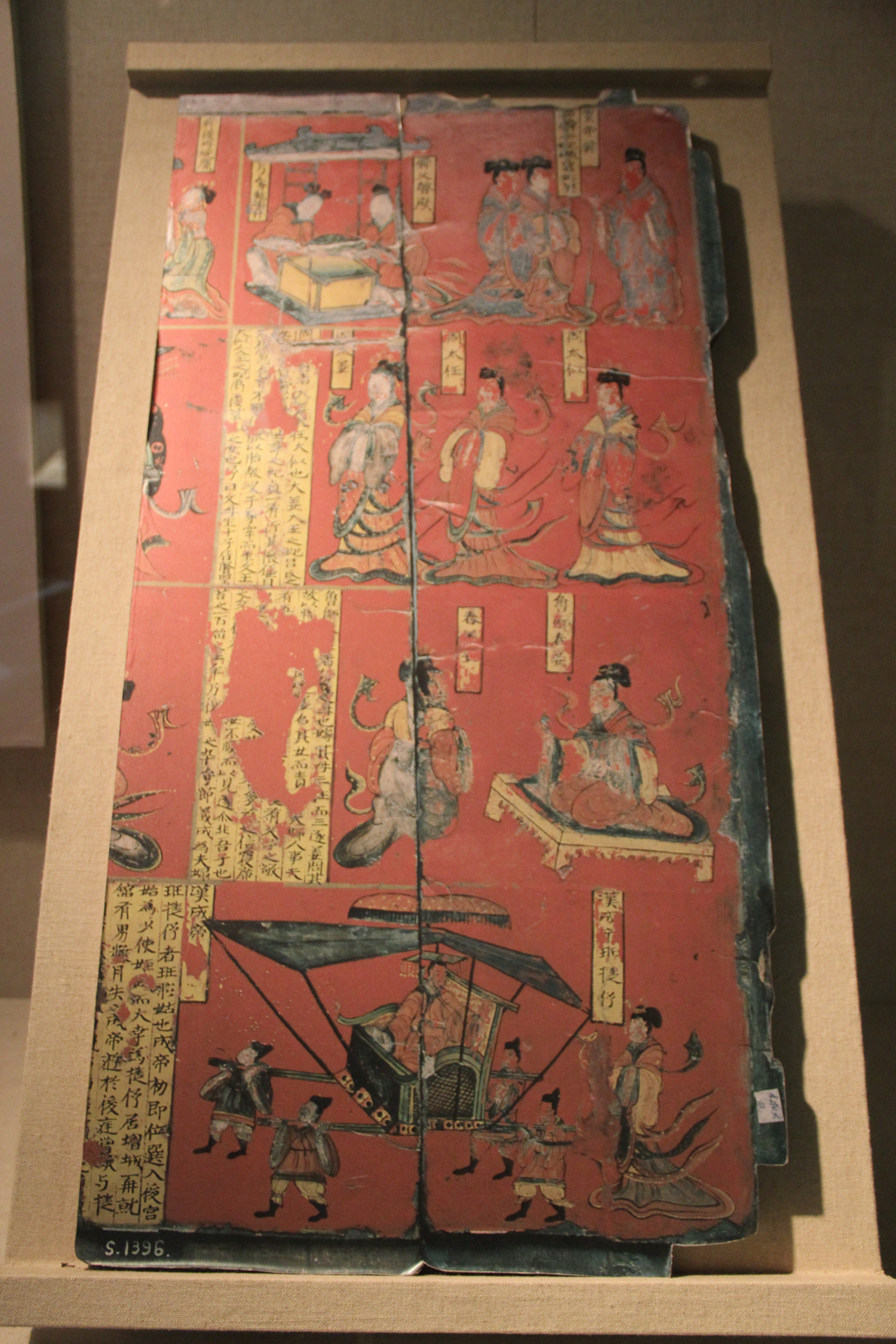
Lacquer painting over wood, Northern Wei, 484 AD

There are a variety of lacquers that have been, and continue to be used such as Urushi (unprocessed lacquer), Guangqi (processed), nitrocellulose, lacquers with acrylic resins, and water-based lacquers, but the most well known lacquer is Urushi lacquer. This lacquer paint is made from raw lacquer or sap taken from trees. It is then heated, filtered, and applied in thin layers to supports such as wood or metal. The lacquer is left to cure before it is polished, and another layer is added. The number of layers may vary, and each can be left in its natural transparent state, or colored with pigments to create lacquer painting.

Preventive conservation

While lacquer is a hard material, it is best to first prevent damage and loss by maintaining proper environmental conditions. Lacquer is susceptible to cracks and loose joins from fluctuating temperatures and relative humidity. Extended exposure to light can also cause lacquer to lose its durability. Over exposure can also cause discoloration and loss of lustre. Avoiding exposure to unfiltered daylight and fluorescent lamps can help to prevent this type of damage. Temperatures should be kept as low and consistent as possible to avoid changes in relative humidity which can cause condensation. Condensation can cause shrinkage and swelling in the wood that he lacquer is applied to.

Conservation and restoration methods

Treatments to lacquer paintings may include consolidation and repair work before or after cleaning. Consolidation can be used to repair cupping and flaking.

=== Oil paintings ===
The Battle of Nashville by Howard Pyle
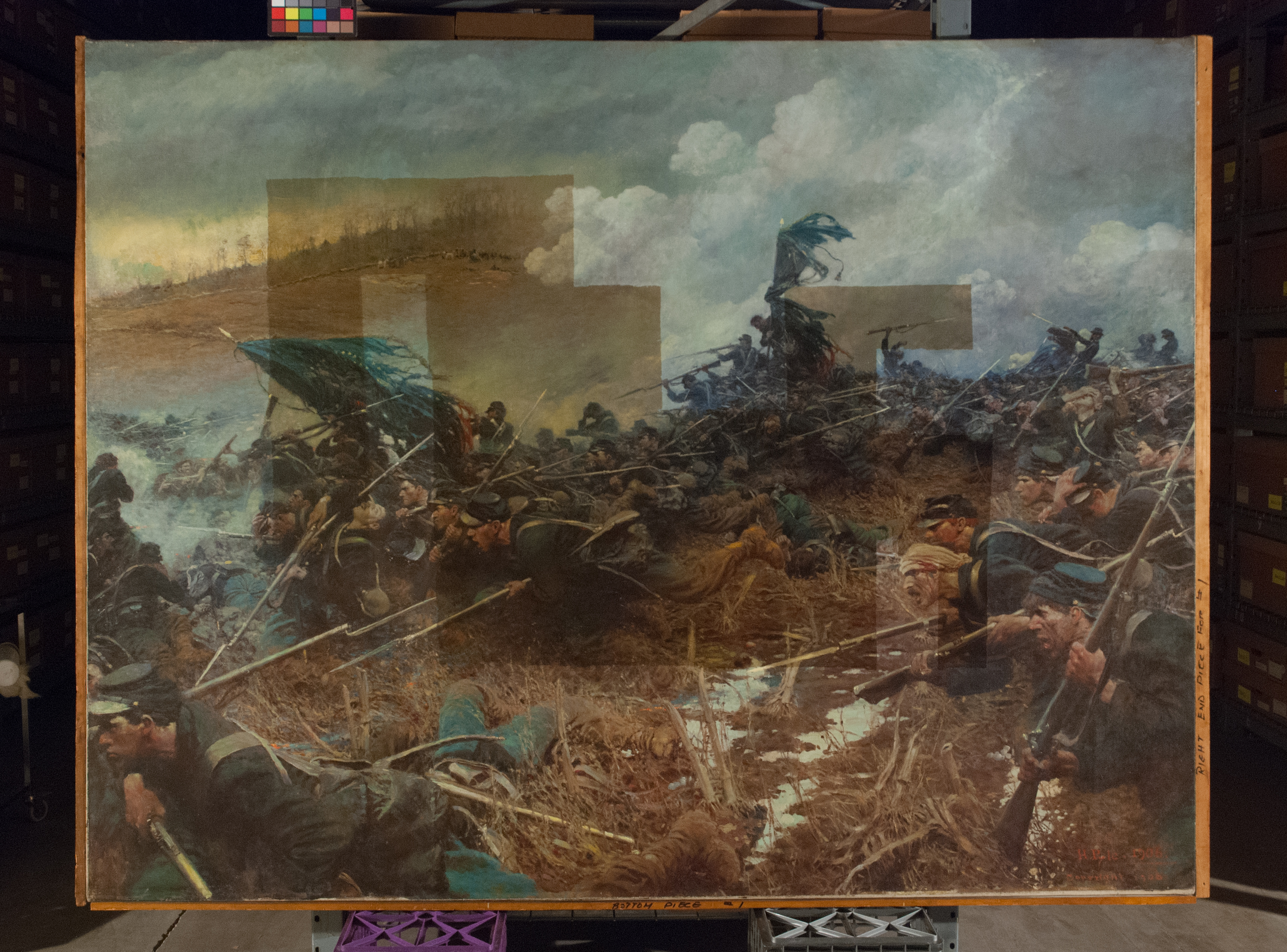
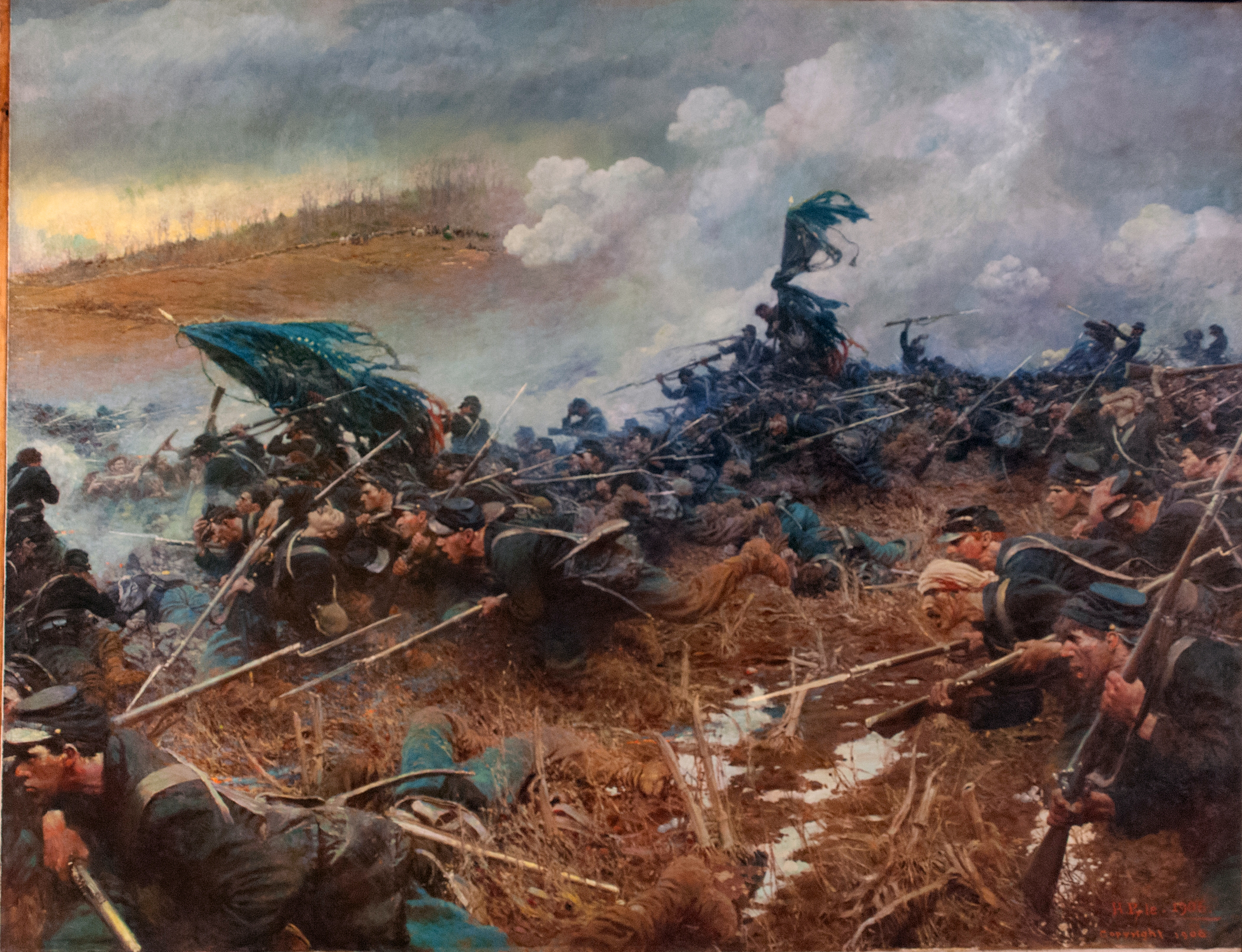
1. During restoration; 2. After restoration

Oil paint is a medium made up of pigments and a drying oil binding agent. Various other ingredients can be mixed in to condition the paint in several ways and modify its various properties and drying. Oil paintings are painted on various surface support types. Oil on canvas, oil on board, and oil on metal are only some examples of oil paintings on various surfaces. Oil paintings are susceptible to damage from vandalism, time, improper handling, environmental stressors and temperature changes. They are also susceptible to damage in low relative humid conditions, and fluctuations can create stresses in the paint layers.

Preventive conservation

Preventive care for oil paintings is essential for preservation. Excessive light with heat can cause fading to pigments. Proper storage with climate and lighting controls are important especially depending on the support structure. The wooden stretcher behind an oil painting on canvas will expand and contract with moisture causing possible buckling of the canvas and cracking, flaking, or shattering of the paint. Paintings should be stored off the ground in case of flooding. Moisture and water damage can cause mold to develop along with various other issues depending on the materials involved: rot (natural materials), rusting (in metals), warping (of wooden supports), etc.

Conservation and restoration methods

Treatment methods may include rejoining split wooden panels, mending torn fabric, or consolidating lifting paint flakes. Cleaning old and yellowing varnish, and revarnish the painting.

=== Pastels ===
There are two types of pastels. Pastels that are made of pigment particles bound together with a binding agent, and oil pastels that have pigments mixed with wax and non-drying oil. Pastels that are pigment particles bound together take on a more chalky and loose powdery characterization, and are secured to its supports using fixative or diluted resin in solution. Oil pastels never fully dry, and are sensitive to scrapes, dust and dirt.

Preventive conservation

In general, works of art on paper should be stored in a cool and relatively dry room with minimal exposure to light. Pastel artworks should be matted and framed. Framing should be under ultraviolet filtering acrylic sheeting. Using a glaze over the surface of the oil pastel works can help to protect the oil pastel from damage. Limited exhibition time and low light intensity is recommended to limit light exposure. Excessive light exposure can cause pigment fading and discoloration in the paper.

Conservation and restoration methods

Preventive conservation is key. Some damage to works of art on paper is irreversible, but there are some methods of restoration that can be used to treat damages such as structural tension in the paper created by previous restoration treatments. This may include removal of the secondary and adhering a new support or even an internal cardboard support.

=== Watercolor and gouache ===
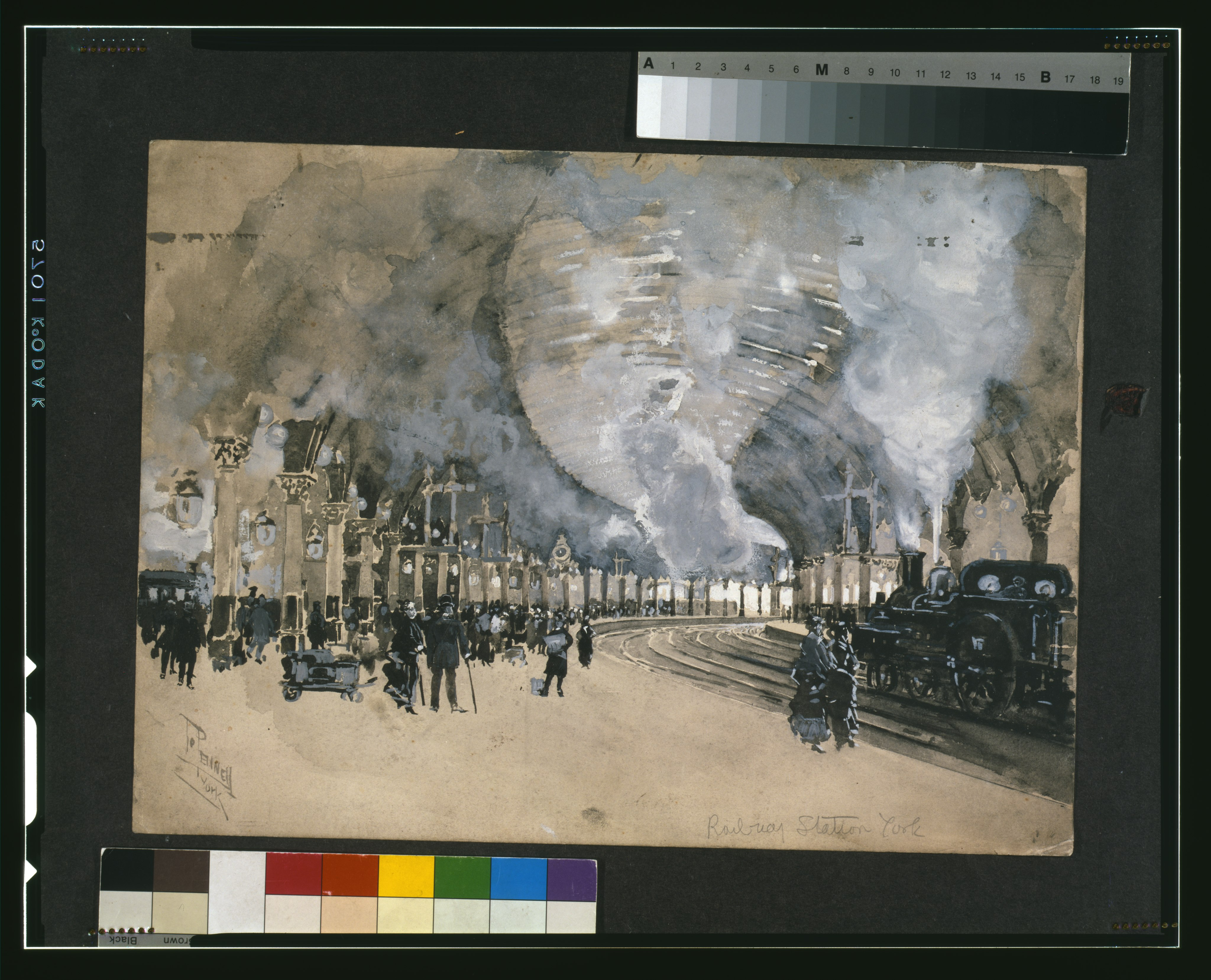
Watercolor painting, Railway Station, JoPennell York. 1895

Watercolor and gouache paintings are pigments mixed into water-soluble gums that are applied onto paper or rigid board supports. Due to its thin washes and light colors, watercolor paintings are very light sensitive. Also, due to their exposed support they are vulnerable to damage from dirt, dust, and pollutants. Gouache paintings can form layers like acrylic and oil paint, but is still vulnerable to the same agents of deterioration as watercolors.

Preventive conservation

Damage to watercolor and gouache paintings can be prevented and mitigated by maintaining temperature and relative humidity within acceptable ranges, and low light conditions. As with pastel works, watercolor and gouache paintings should be mounted and framed. Damage that may occur are disfiguring brown spots from mold growth, paper turning brown and brittle from cardboard supports, yellow stains from adhesive tapes, and cockling and undulations.

Conservation and restoration methods

Some treatments to watercolor works may include a washing treatment to remove discoloration from acidic mounts, tapes, and adhesives. Stains from these products can also be treated with solvents. Tears and losses can be repaired with products such as wheat starch paste or methyl cellulose, and weakened paper can be strengthened by attaching a lining.

=== Scroll and screen paintings ===
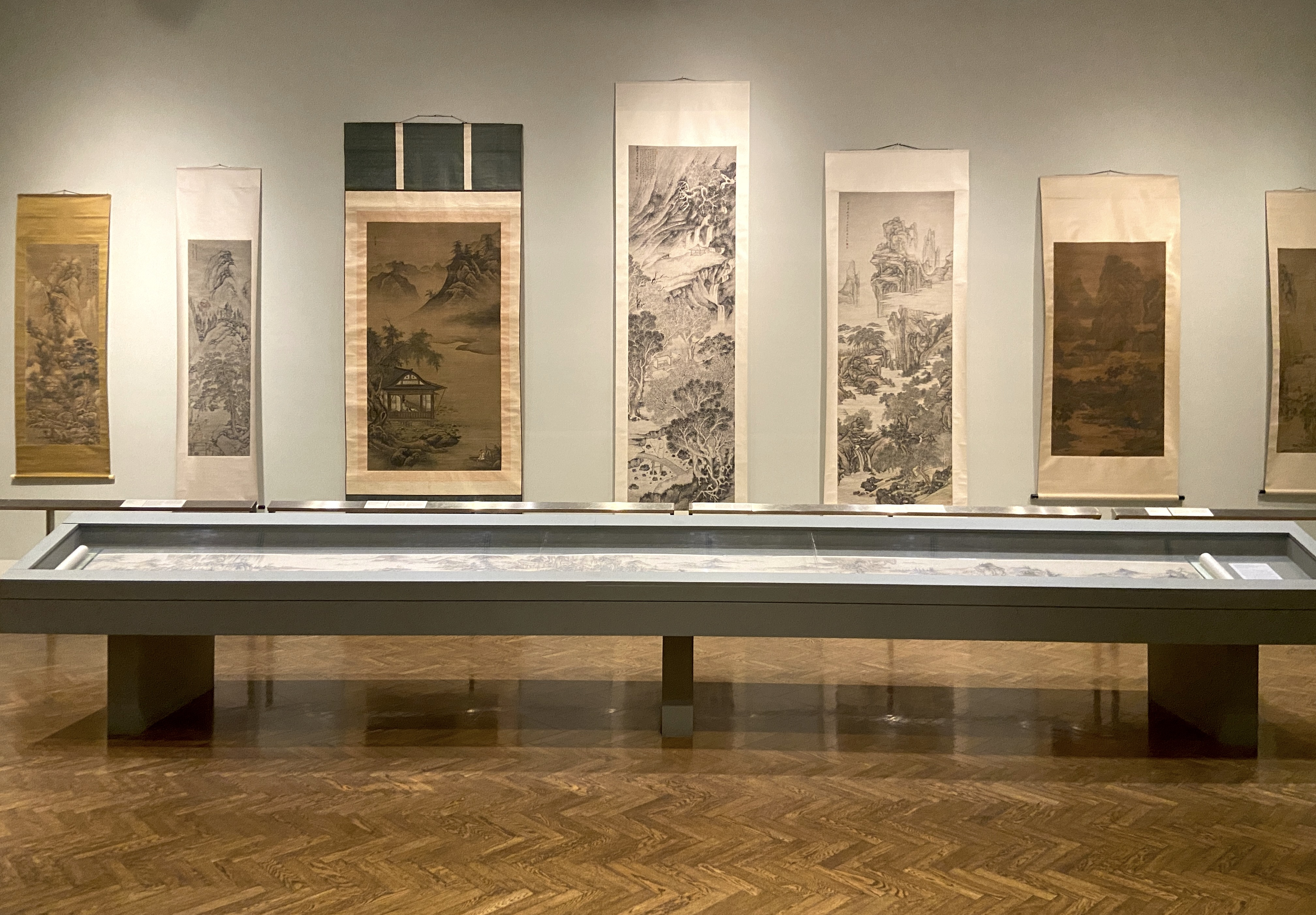
Collection of painted hanging scrolls

Scroll paintings (hanging scrolls and handscrolls) and screen paintings are made of ink, color, pigment, silk and paper. Scroll paintings often are multiple layers of paper and silk attached to wooden bars called a stave and dowel. Screens are often single panels that are joined by paper hinges that fold into each other like an accordion.

Preventive conservation

Scrolls and screens are vulnerable to damage from fluctuations in temperature and humidity. Exposure to light for extended periods of time can cause silk and pigments to fade, and paper to darken. Glazes and films that filter ultraviolet light can help to prevent damage from UV radiation. Creases and abrasions may also form on scroll paintings from repeated rolling and unrolling, squeezing the scroll or tying the cord too tight. Screens can become distorted from uneven tension between the back and front side panels.

Conservation and restoration methods

Conservation treatments require significant research as the variations in technique and materials among Asian scroll and screen paintings is great. In general some types of conservation treatments that may be conducted on scroll paintings and screens include remounting, consolidation of pigments, removing old backings, and in-painting and retouching. In-painting and retouching materials for scrolls and screens is not reversible. In-painting and retouches should only be done on losses or fills. In-painted areas can darken due to losses that have a heavy concentration of animal gelatin/alum for in-painting.

== Painting supports and preventive conservation ==
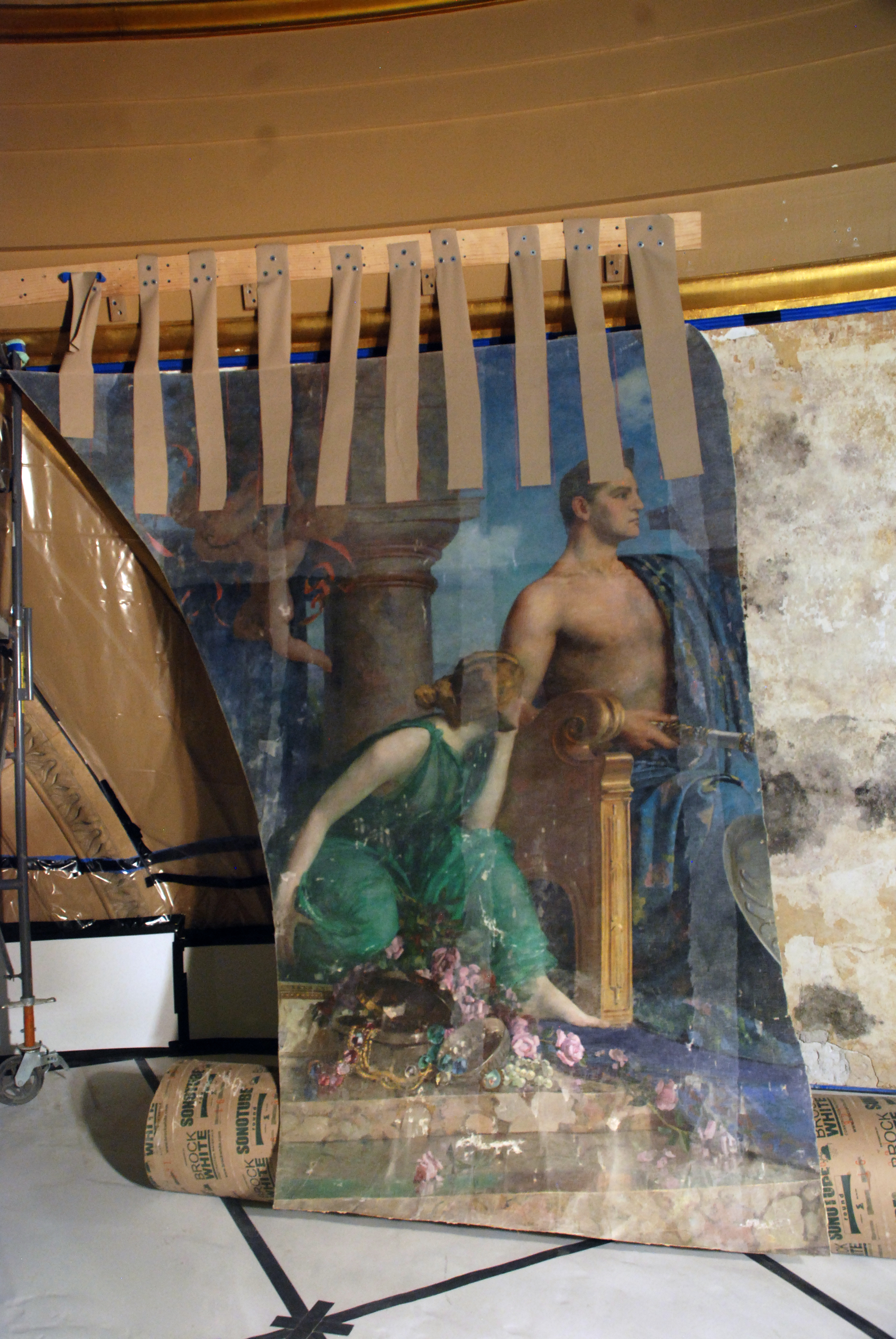
Removal of painting mural to repair support wall.

The material that makes up the support can have a major impact on the overall deterioration of an artwork, it can also determine the best method for handling, storing, and displaying an object.

=== Architectural structures (i.e. walls and ceilings) ===
Architectural structures such as walls and ceilings are typical supports for fresco and mural style paintings. Preserving both the paint layer and the support (wall) is crucial. Regular maintenance of the building and structure is necessary to safeguarding wall paintings. Monitoring environmental conditions, limiting visitor access, and temporary closures to public access can be used to help preserve the paintings. Conservation treatments may take the form of reconstruction using traditional materials and techniques, and complete or partial coverings with protective layers.

=== Canvas ===
Canvas, typically made from linen, hemp, jute, burlap, and cotton, is often stretched onto a wooden frame called a stretcher. Canvas can also come in the form of canvas board. As with all parts of a painting, deterioration is inevitable. Re-lining or lining treatments was used to added support to the original canvas until it was determined that it created more damage. Strip-lining is now used instead. Strip-lining involves reinforcing tacking that has weakened. Tears in the canvas are repaired with adhesive or sewing.

=== Ceramics ===
Ceramics vary widely in their construction, style, and use. There are three types of ceramic objects. They are earthenware, stoneware, and porcelain. Each of these types of ceramic objects are fired at different degrees and come in different colors.

The materials used in their construction are often a clay body, and some times mixed with sand, shell, chalk, mica, and ground-up fired ceramics. The surface of these ceramic objects are finished with glaze and fired in a number of ways. Decorations with gold, paint or enamel are applied over the glaze. These overglaze decorations are susceptible to abrasions or chemical damage from cleaning and handling. A ceramic object is also vulnerable to weeping and crizzling from fluctuations in relative humidity and temperature.

=== Cloth or textiles ===
Cloth or textiles are typically made from natural fibers such as wool, silk, cotton, linen, and hemp. However, some textiles more recently have been created with modified natural fibers such as Rayon. Textiles can make up many different objects from cushions to dresses. All with varying degrees and types of degradation. Light typically causes dyes to fade, and some fibers (silk) are more sensitive to physical damage from light. Low light levels are recommended to prevent damage. Mold and mildew caused by high levels of humidity and improper storage can cause irreversible damage. Damage can be mitigated with proper relative humidity levels and storing of textiles in acid-free tissue or clean cotton sheets. Textiles are especially vulnerable to attacks from pests such as moths and silverfish.

=== Glass ===
Paintings on glass are particularly challenging for conservation because first the fragile nature of glass, and second the smooth surface of glass that makes it difficult for paint to adhere to the surface. Glass objects are not subject to the same vulnerability to environmental conditions as other types of paintings, but are most susceptible to damage from improper handling and inappropriate cleaning methods.

=== Ivory ===
Paintings on ivory are typically small, and the most commonly used paints were (watercolor, tempera, and gouache) directly on the surface of the ivory. The ivory was usually thin, translucent in appearance, and typically attached to a secondary support made of paper or card. Miniatures of these designs were frequently sealed in metal lockets or cases. The paint on the surface of ivory is very delicate and can be easily rubbed off, small amounts of water (breath, condensation or residues from cleaning) can affect the image. Ivory is also very sensitive to environmental changes. Ivory supports can be prone susceptible to warping and splitting from fluctuations in relative humidity.

=== Metal ===
Various types of metal plates have been used as supports for paintings. These include: silver, tin leaf, iron with tin on either side, copper, or copper coated with silver, tin, lead, or zinc. Enamel paint has been used on copper, but typically oil paint was used on metal supports. Metal does not respond to changes in relative humidity by expanding and contracting. However, metal can corrode over time staining paint or creating eruptions and flake in the paint. It is also susceptible to physical deterioration such as dents, tears, and scratches.

=== Outdoor murals ===
Outdoor murals are typically painted on cementitious materials. As the paintings are located outside, they are subjected to harsh environmental conditions. Some of the damages that murals are subjected to are graffiti, cracking, changes in color, and fading from UV radiation. Research is being conducted to determine reversibility, and UV barrier coatings.

=== Paper ===
Works of art on paper range from watercolor paintings, prints, posters, and drawings using a variety of media from watercolor, charcoal, pastels, and colored inks. Due to the fibers in its construction, paper is vulnerable to various types of damage. Paper is easily torn, creased, or stained during handling. When exposed to light colors fade and the paper itself can discolor too. Works of art like watercolors and Japanese prints are especially vulnerable to fading. High relative humidity can cause paper to swell making it appear wavy or winkled. When exposed to long periods of high humidity, mold can form.

=== Wood ===
(Furniture, Panel, Lacquer painting, Stretcher bar, Woodblock prints)

Wooden supports depending on what kind of object they are used for are made from hard and soft woods. Some types of woods that artists use are poplar, beech, spruce, pine, chestnut, cherry, mahogany, and cypress. Wooden supports are susceptible to several kinds of deterioration. These include insect infestation, fluctuations in humidity/temperature causing warping and cracking, and structural damages. Cradling was previously used to correct warping by thinning the original structural support and then adhering the cradle to the reverse side of the support. However, it has become widely understood that cradling can be harmful to the paint and ground layers. Conservators today instead work to preserve what remains of the wood support rather than making corrections.

== Material combination issues ==
| Combination of materials | Conservation issues |
|---|---|
| wood/ paint | wood expands and contract, paint flakes |
| metal/ paint | metal corrodes, paint flakes |
| metal/ plaster | alkaline materials corrode metals |
| wood/ paper | paper becomes brittle, stained, dark, acid burned |
| wood/ wood | changes due to expansion and contraction, stress, breaks |

== Conservation treatments and processes ==
After determining an artworks condition, stability, history of previous restoration, and documenting and photographing the examination, future conservation treatments can be determined. The results of conservation treatments often yield a more "stable paint layer and support, more appropriate aesthetic presentation through cleaning, and a more unified paintings through the reintegration of the paint losses. It is not possible to restore a painting to its original form, but with careful preservation, documentation and restoration, conservators can help to extend the life expectancy of a painting." These treatments depend on the materials that make up an artwork. They can include:

- Consolidation - securing areas of loose paint with adhesive.
- Cleaning - removing or reducing "dirt, grime, discolored varnish, and retouching with solvent mixtures or mechanical means".
- Facing - securing the paint layer with tissue and adhesive before corrective structural procedures.
- Transferring -removing the original canvas or wood support, leaving the paint and/or ground layer, and re adhering the layers to a new support.
- Cradling - applying a wood latticework on the backside of a panel painting to prevent warping. Before cradling, the wood support is typically thinned.
- Lining - adhering a new canvas to the reverse side of the original canvases for added support.
- Lining removal - removing the old lining of a canvas because the adhesive has failed and resulted in delamination between the original canvas and the lining canvas.
- Varnishing - applying "saturating varnish of either a synthetic resin or a stabilized natural resin varnish".
- Filling - adding "putty-like material" to areas of paint loss.
- Inpainting - applying synthetic or natural resin medium restoration paints to areas of paint loss to restore the "visual unity" of the painting.

== Scientific tools used ==
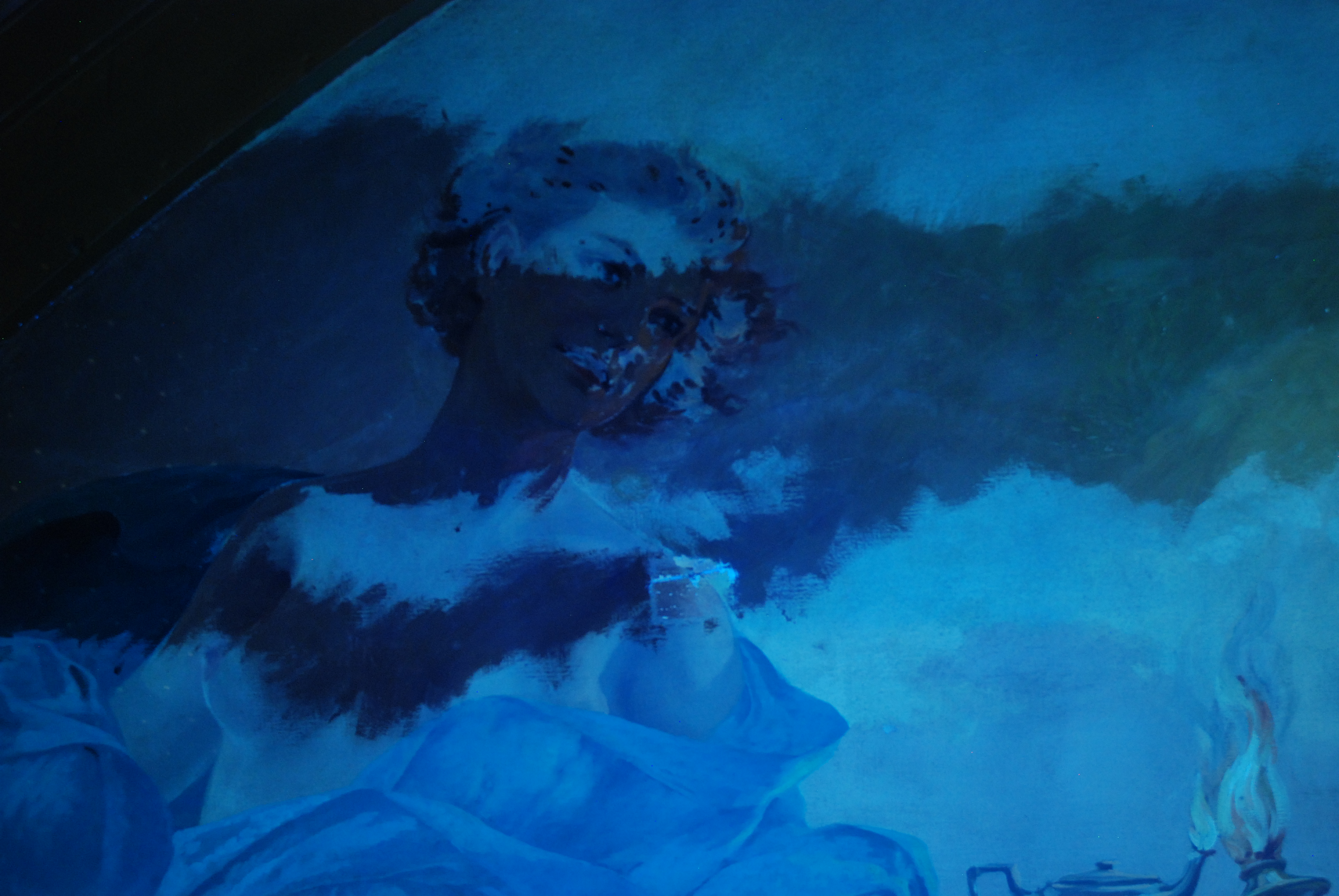
UV light showing extensive modification

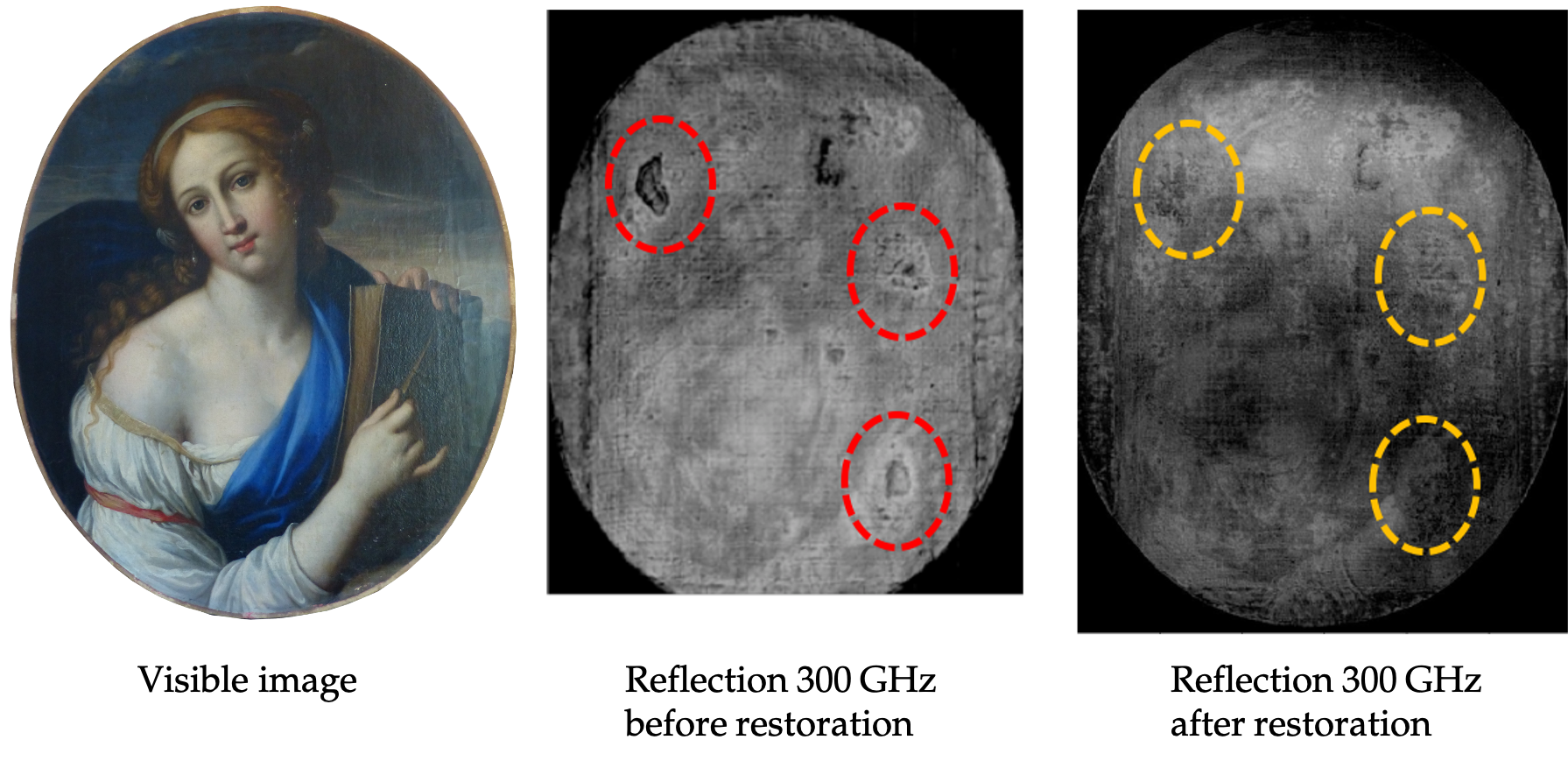
Terahertz image before and after the restoration of an oil painting

Conservators need to analyze the inner layers of paintings and their support to identify pigments and unstable layers. They use various tools for types of imaging to disguise materials and damages, including:

- Multispectral imaging - the capture of a single image viewed in different wavelengths. For imaging purposes of conservation, paintings are recorded in the wavelengths: ultraviolet (UV), visible (VIS) and infrared (IR).
- VIS – Visible Light – The photo image visible to the naked eye representing the actual colors of the painting.
- RAK-Raking Light – Lighting the painting from the sides to show the small cracks and surface texture clearly.
- UVF – Ultraviolet Fluorescence – Lighting the painting with ultraviolet radiation to resulting in fluorescent glowing from the varnishes and previous conservation.
- IRR-Infrared Reflectography – when the painting is exposed to infrared radiation and its reflection is recorded. The underpainting or drawing of the painting will become visible with IR radiation.
- IRFC – Infrared False Color – When the visible image and infrared image are overlapped to view the areas of different material usage and retouches.
- IRF-Infrared Fluorescence – The painting is exposed to both visible light and infrared light causing particular pigments to fluoresce revealing the chemicals and types of paint used.
- IRTR – Infrared Transmitted – The painting is flooded with infrared radiation and the verso of the painting transmits radiation. The image taken of the verso will show underdrawings and alterations made by the artist.
- X-ray radiology - often taken to detect areas of various heavy metals found in paint such as lead, tin, mercuric sulfide.
- X-ray fluorescence = a technique used to identify the chemical composition of the materials used to make the paint.
- Scanning macro-XRF and neutron activation autoradiography (NAAR) - Scanning techniques that images with element specific characters that are able to reveal underlying paint layers
- Terahertz imaging - Terahertz imaging is able to show hidden layers and reveal defects like delamination and void, highlight previous restorations like relining, and can be used before restoration.

== See also ==
- Collections care
- Mending
- Conservator-restorer
- Darning
- Fresco
- Kintsugi
- Multispectral image
- Museum integrated pest management
- Painting
- Painting conservator
- Restoration (cultural heritage)
- Tempera
