= Cradling (paintings) =

Process used in painting conservation

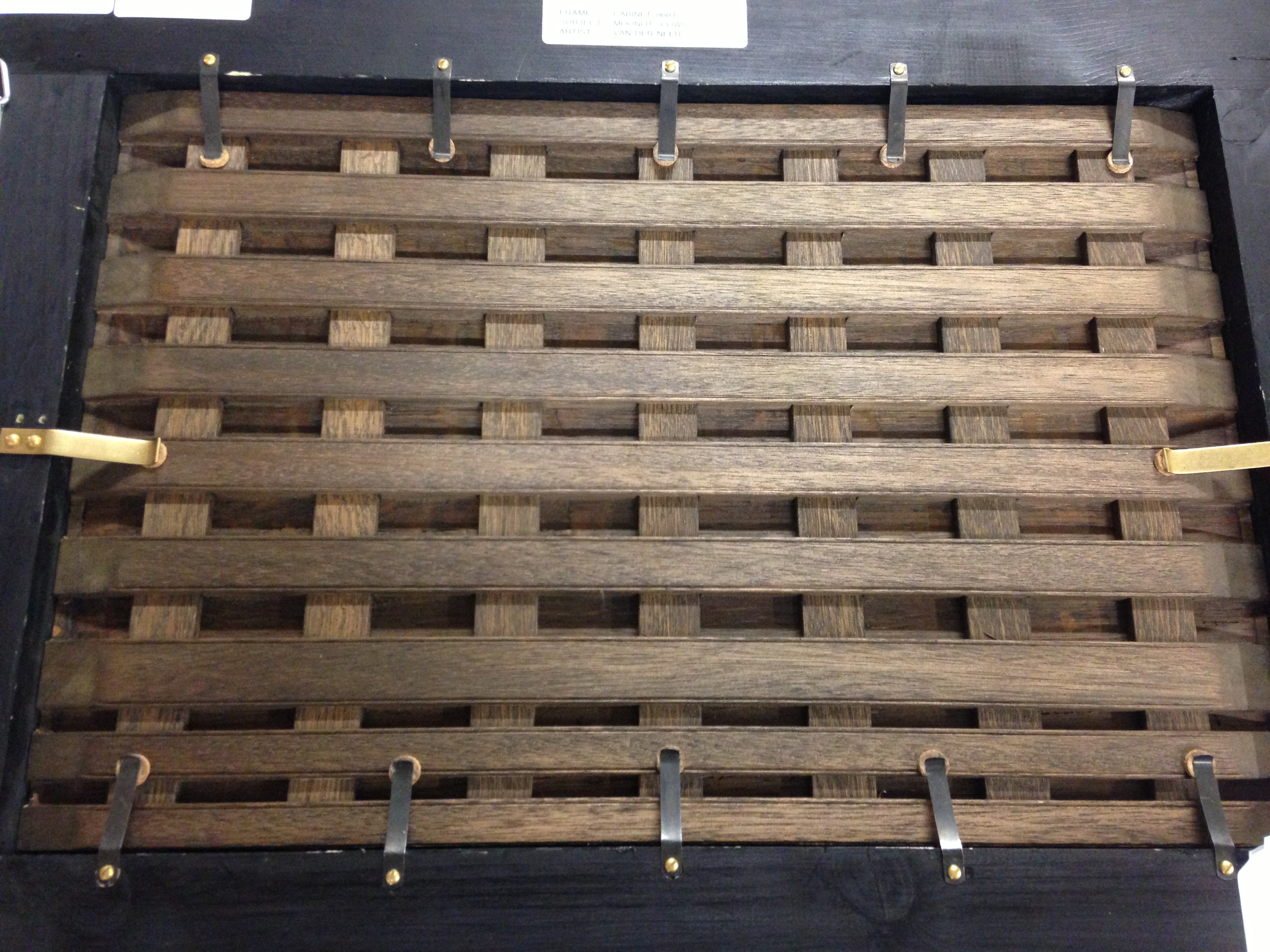
Example of a cradled panel, mounted on the back of a painting by Aert van der Neer.

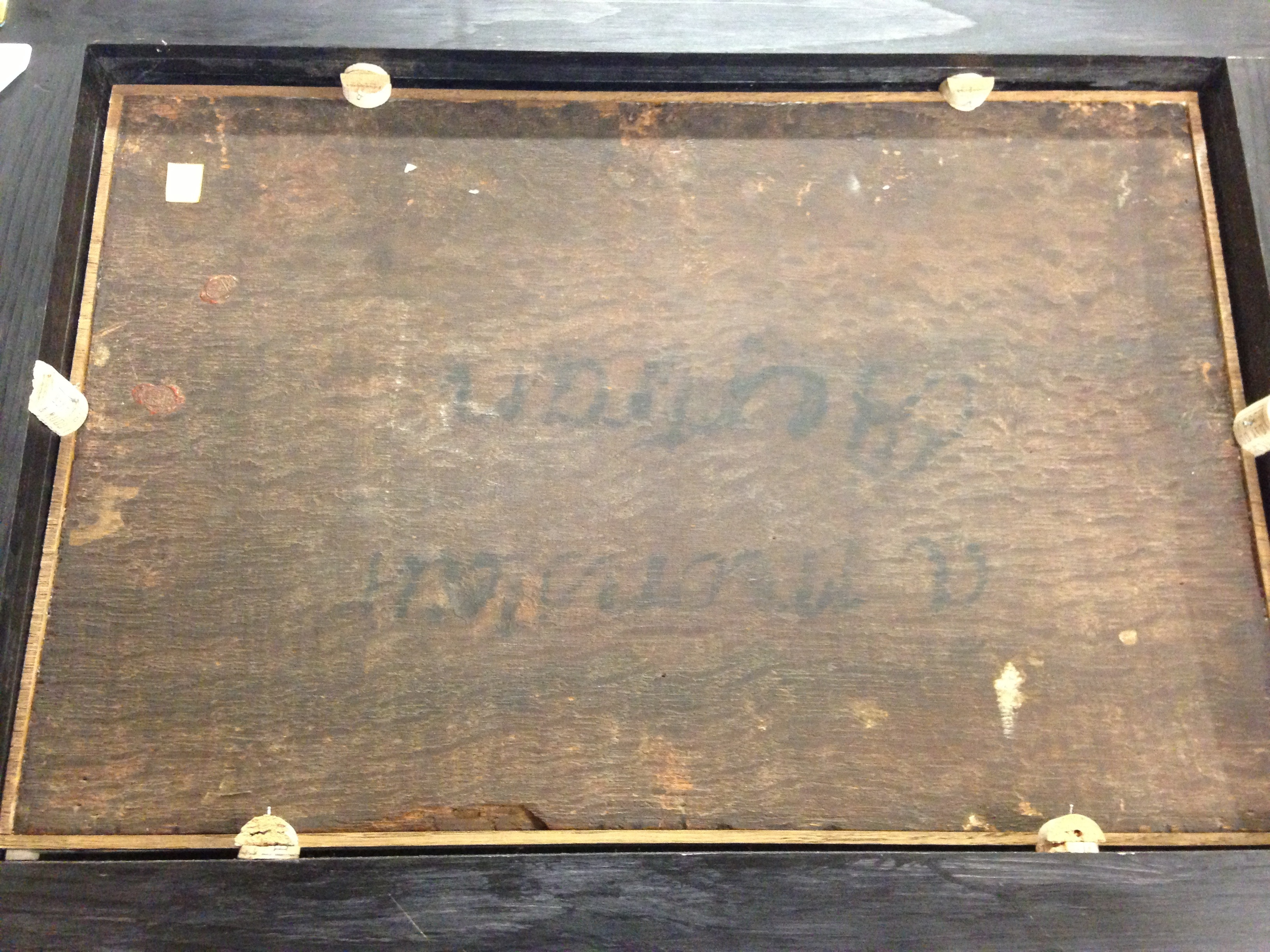
Example of an oak panel in its original state, the back of a Jan Davidsz. de Heem still life.

Cradling is a process used in the restoration and preservation of paintings on wooden panel. It consists in mounting a grid of wooden slats to the back of a painting to create a reinforcement and preserve the flat paint surface.

Slats in either the horizontal or vertical direction are permanently fixed to the back of the panel, whilst the secondary perpendicular slats remain loose, held solely in place by the upper row. This allows for a degree of movement in the panel, which may warp, subject to changing levels of dampness and atmospheric pressure.

This procedure can often be found on Old Master paintings of the 16th and 17th centuries, when painting on wood and particularly oak panel was widely practiced.

There are numerous reasons for choosing to cradle a panel. This can be done to piece back together a painting which has split and cracked over time. It can also be done to consolidate, preserve or straighten back a panel which may have warped.

There are detrimental factors to consider before cradling a painting. It is an interventive procedure which may involve sanding the back of the panel in order to create a flat surface to affix the cradling. It is a non reversible procedure which alters the condition and state of a work of art, which triggers ethical issues.

With many cradled paintings the sliding cradle members will get stuck due to the movement of the panel. This leads to much tension and cracks in the panel and permanent deformation. Applying a cradle to the back of a panel painting almost always leads to more severe structural problems depending on the climate in which the painting is kept and the way the planks of the panel were sawn. Nowadays, in the modern world of conservation cradling a painting has been outdated and subject to criticism.

Duke University and The University of Brussels have developed an art conservation tool that uses X-rays and algorithms to analyze the paintings. To better image the art piece, for it is of wood sections (cradles) the machine called Platypus or the computer math program sorts out the wood and finely visualizes the original art.
