= Conservation and restoration of woodblock prints =

Preservation of heritage collections

The conservation and restoration of woodblock prints, is the process of caring for and repairing images made from a specific printing process involving using wooden reliefs to stamp or imprint an image onto paper. The process of creating woodblock prints as Asian examples are known, or woodcuts as Western examples are called, has been known for many centuries, and many older prints have experienced aging and deterioration of the paper and colorants used.

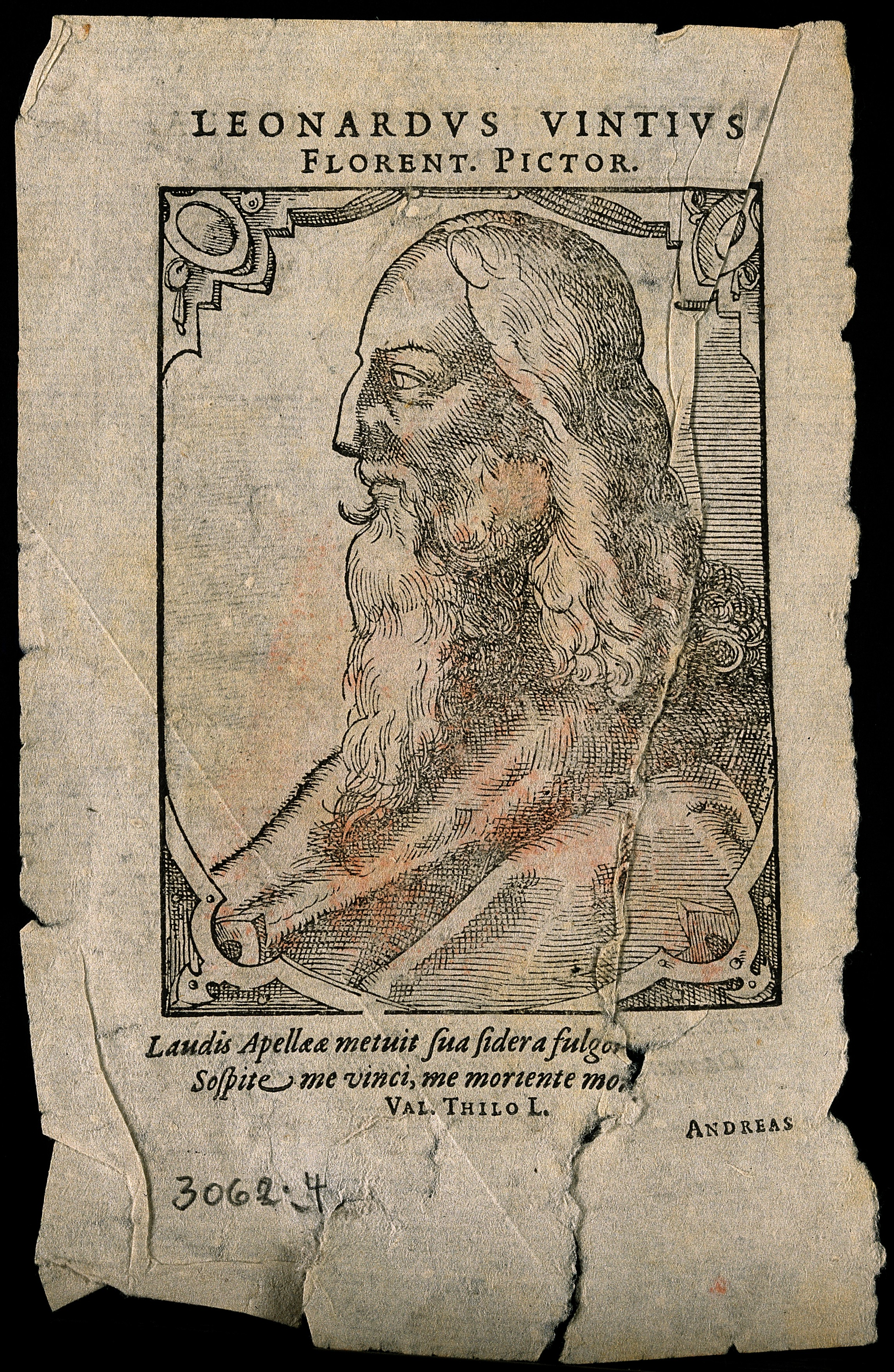
Print shows discoloration, tearing, creasing, and water damage. Leonardo da Vinci, woodcut portrait by T. Stimmer, 1589.

== Common materials ==
=== Japanese woodblock prints ===
Woodblock prints from Japan are commonly printed on kozo, paper made from mulberry tree fibers. Many pigments were derived from organic materials. For example, some blue hues were derived from dayflower petals. Other inorganic colorants, such as red lead, were also used.

=== Chinese woodblock prints ===
Fibers of Chinese woodblock prints come from five different plant groups: hemp, bark, rattan, bamboo, and grass. Fibers from these different groups were often combined, based on which plants were locally available.

=== European woodcuts ===
European woodcuts such as Italian chiaroscuro woodcuts, were generally made of three materials: paper, pigment, and a pigment binder. Paper was generally thin, because woodcuts were made in larger batches, and were relatively cheap. The pigments were composed of both light-stable inorganic materials such as metals and earth compounds as well as organic colorants such as indigo. Both of these respond to environmental conditions different, and require different conservation treatments depending on the chemical composition. Binding agents for the pigments were oil-based and used to dry the inks more quickly. They were made from materials such as linseed oil and conifer resin.

== Agents of deterioration ==
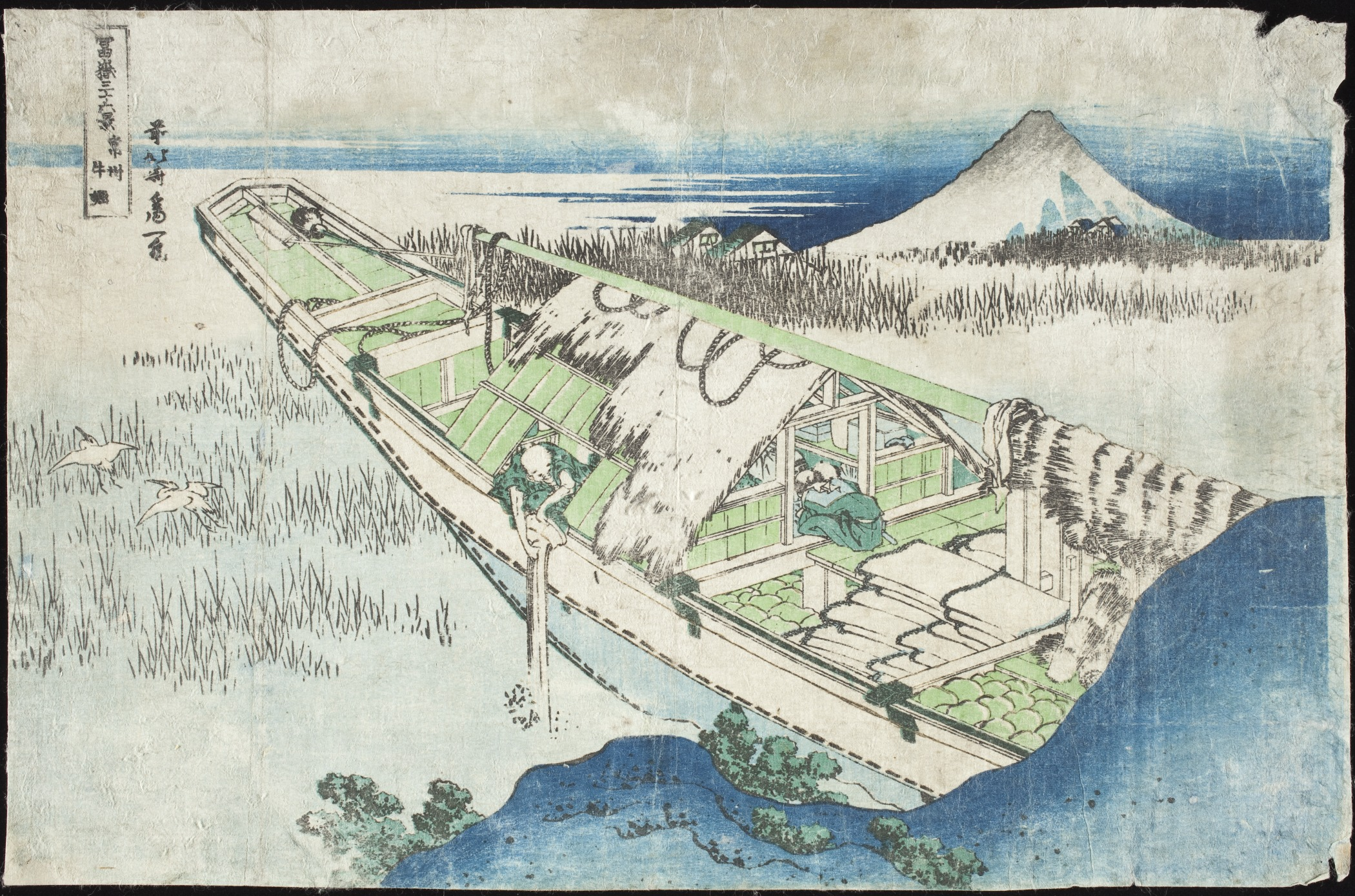
Joshu, Ushibori, Hetachi Provinces LACMA 46.38.12

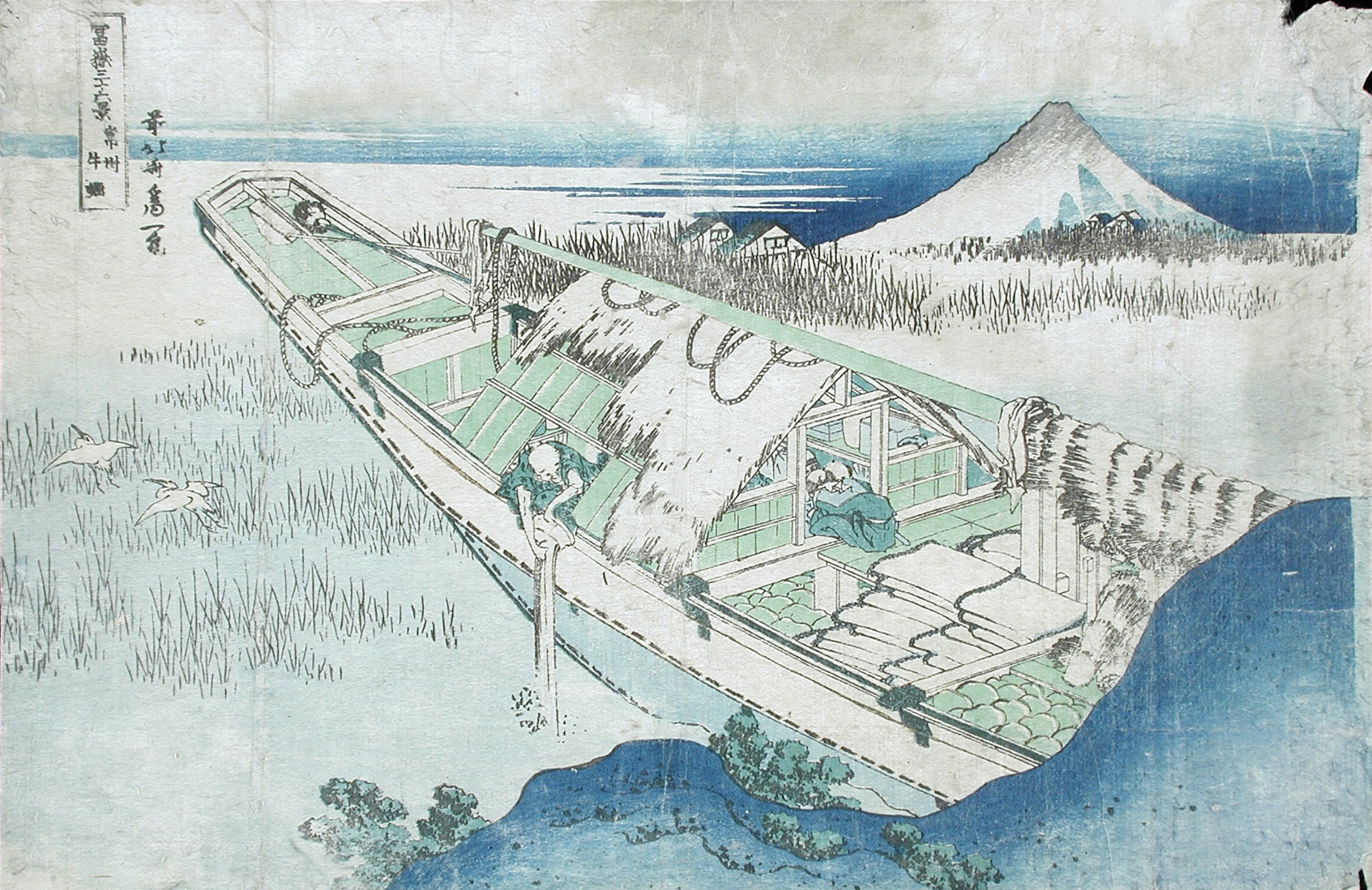
Print shows signs of fading. Joshu, Ushibori, Hetachi Provinces LACMA 46.38.12

=== Light ===
Light has been known to fade pigments in woodblock prints, such as the colorant dayflower blue, found in many Japanese woodblock prints. Ultraviolet is the most damaging wavelength, yet even infrared can cause damage, especially because it also heats up prints when they are exposed to infrared waves.

=== Humidity ===
Paper and pigments are both very sensitive to changing humidity levels. If relative humidity falls lower than 35 percent, the paper can dry out and become brittle. If it reaches higher than 65 percent, the paper can become distorted. Furthermore, certain pigments can become more translucent in higher relative humidity. High fluctuations in relative humidity may cause the paper to experience stresses that could cause it to crack. Humidity can also aid the growth of pests and mold.

=== Heat ===
Heat can accelerate the rate of mechanical stresses in organic materials and cause the structure to become brittle or unstable.

=== Pollutants ===
Pollutants found in the air can interact with materials on woodblock prints and cause them to deteriorate at a quicker rate. For example, when exposed to sulfur-containing gases, red lead pigments will turn a metallic brown/black color.

=== Pests ===
Insects and pests can destroy woodblock prints by eating through the paper or leaving droppings that stain the paper. A common cause of holes in Japanese woodblock prints is the deathwatch beetle (Xestobium rufovillosum). These beetles were commonly found in wood used to build furniture in the Edo period. Woodblock prints that were stored on bookshelves, or other furniture infested with these beetles, also became infested themselves.

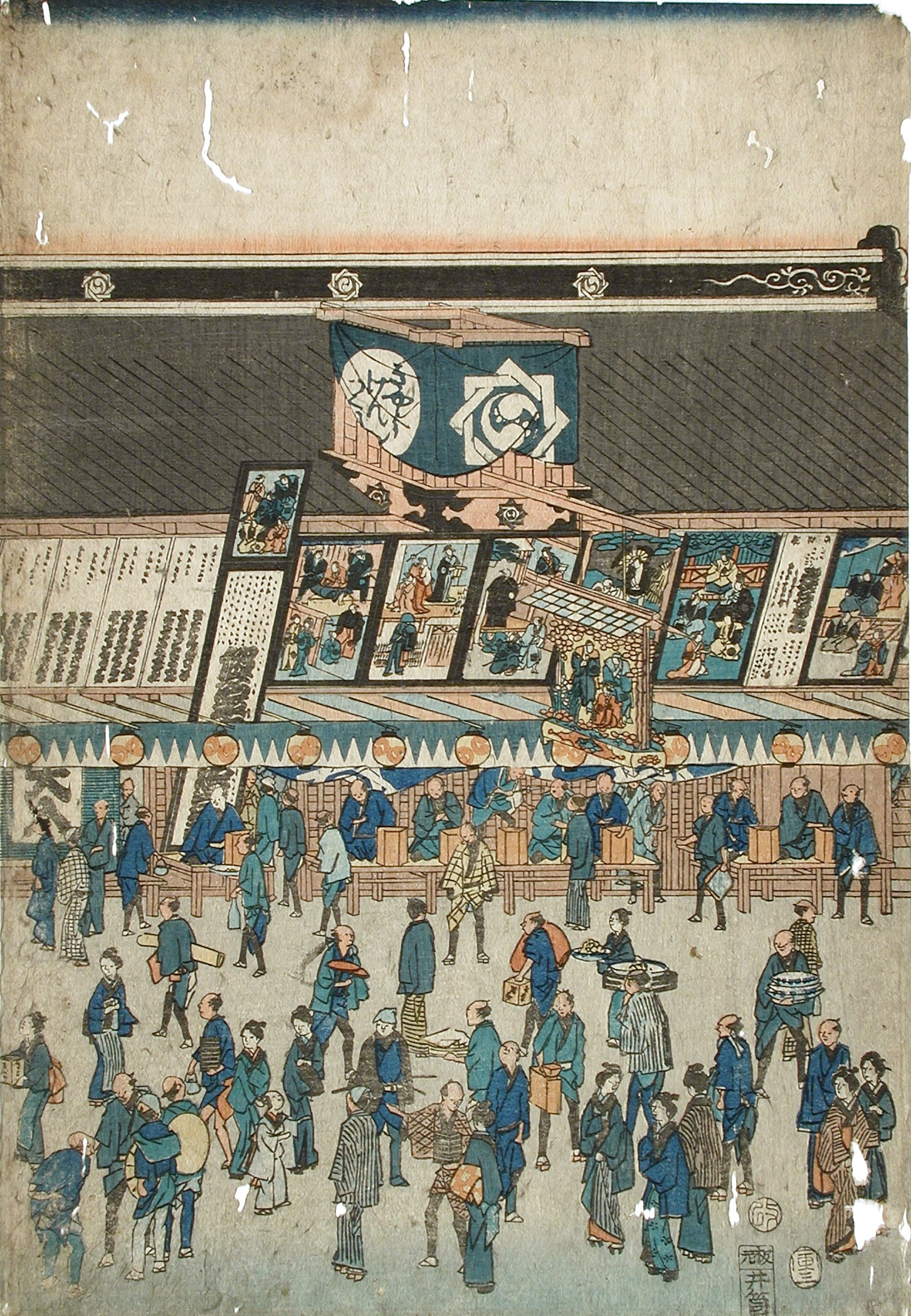
Print shows holes caused by Deathwatch beetles. Kabuki Theatre Kawarazakiza LACMA M.2000.105.36a-c

== Preventive conservation ==
Preventive conservation, or collections care, is a way of preventing deterioration of materials by reducing agents of deterioration. A good integrated pest management system as well as an HVAC system that filters for common pollutants have been known to reduce the damage woodblock prints receive.

=== Storage ===
The paper of woodblocks are often made of wood fibers and may react to non-archival quality storage materials. For example, if stored in paper folders, the prints can become acidic. Using acid-free storage materials can prevent these acidic processes. Storage materials such as folders or boxes can also prevent light from reaching the print, and further reduce damage to light-sensitive materials.

=== Display ===
Ultraviolet-filtered, Plexiglas-glazed frames do little to protect woodblock prints from light damage over time. Museums often limit the display of woodblock prints, such as not exposing them to light for more than three weeks at light levels of 50 lux and keep relative humidity at 50 percent ± 5 percent. It is recommended to slowly acclimate prints to any difference in temperature.

== Restoration and treatment ==
=== Spots and stains ===
One method, called a blotter wash, can help to remove stains. This process involves applying a solution (such as a mixture of hydrogen peroxide and water) onto the areas affected by stains, spray rinsing the print in order to rinse off the solution, and then blotting it dry. Many processes for removing stains could be highly detrimental to the paper, the pigment, or both. Water washing techniques such as immersion, floating, or suction table may cause the ink to run. Some organic colorants may even dissolve when exposed to water.

=== Holes and losses ===
Holes should be repaired using infilling. This is the process of adhering a separate piece of paper over the holes. Oftentimes adhesives are added that can be easily removed.

=== Stripping and demounting ===
Demounting is the process of removing a print from the mounting material. This is often done because older mounts were usually made from acidic paper materials that can deteriorate the paper or fade colorants. Mounts are usually adhered to prints through adhesive agents that can cause yellow distortions on the paper.

=== Flattening ===
Dry flattening the paper of a print can sometimes remove signs of cockling, creasing, or wrinkling, In this process, the print is laid flat on a surface, and the weight of another object is used to add even pressure across the print. Sometimes flattening can be unnecessary, such as when storing items in a folder may be suitable instead. Humidity flattening techniques often involve using humidity to help flatten paper objects; however, this technique can cause further damage to prints that have water-soluble colorants.

== Restoration projects ==
=== Antonio da Trento's Martyrdom of Two Saints ===
The Martyrdom of Two Saints from the Los Angeles County Museum of Art is an Italian chiaroscuro woodcut by Antonio da Trento that had cuts in the support. When conservators looked more closely at this artwork in 2016, they also saw unusual discolorations that proved that newer materials were used to conserve the piece in the past, and the added colorants faded at a much slower rate than the original colorants, leaving much darker stains. In order to restore da Tento's print, conservators infilled the support with new paper and masked the newer overpaint with pigments that more closely matched the rest of the print's colors as seen today.

=== Torii Kiyonaga's Two Beauties under a Cherry Tree ===
Two Beauties under a Cherry Tree is a pillar print, a tall and narrow print used to hang in front of traditional Japanese pillars. It is housed at the Library of Congress, and underwent conservation in 2012 for the exhibit, Sakura: Cherry Blossoms as Living Symbols of Friendship. This print was brittle, acidic, discolored, and tearing due to light and pollutants exposure as well as a previous restoration with acidic materials. When it underwent conservation treatment, the print's previous mount was stripped. The print was washed in a calcium solution that reversed some yellow discoloration. In addition, an oxidizing solution was added to red lead colorants that had turned black.
