= Conservation and restoration of lacquerware =

Preservation of heritage collections

The conservation and restoration of lacquerware prevents and mitigates deterioration or damage to objects made with lacquer. The two main types of lacquer are Asian, made with sap from the Urushi tree, and European, made with a variety of shellac and natural resins. Lacquer can be damaged by age, light, water, temperature, or damaged substrate.

Conservation treatments include dry cleaning, wet cleaning, consolidation and filling losses. Eastern cultures use Asian lacquer to repair damages and fill and consolidate losses. Western cultures typically use alternate materials that can be reversed with minimal risk to the original object.

== Production and history of lacquer ==
Lacquer is a type of varnish or surface coating, which is diluted with solvent and applied in several coats to seal a substrate, hardening via a chemical reaction to create a seal. There are two main categories of lacquer: Asian lacquer and European lacquer.

=== Asian lacquer ===
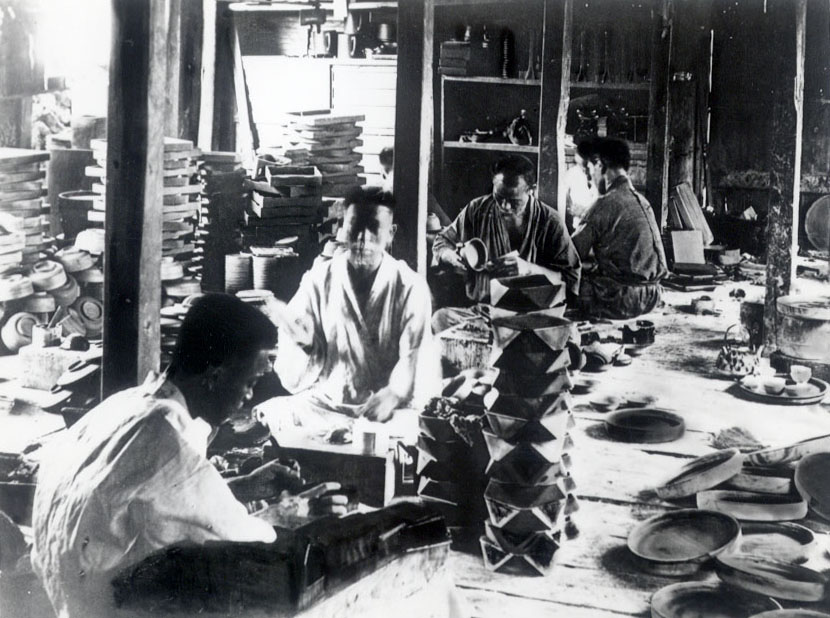
Ryukyu Lacquer Production, Okinawa, Japan

Traditional Asian lacquer has been used for centuries and is derived from sap, prominently that from the Urushi tree; part of the sumac family grown throughout Japan, China and Korea. Sap from the tree contains a chemical compound called urushiol that hardens when exposed to humidity. The sap is processed to remove impurities. The production of lacquerware involves a process of applying a ground layer, oftentimes lacquer mixed with other substances such as clay or a layer of fabric, followed by many very thin layers of processed lacquer to a substrate, typically wood, and allowing them to dry completely, then curing and polishing.

=== European lacquer ===
Developed in the 17th century, European Lacquerware, or Japanning, was influenced by the import of Asian lacquerware. Japanned objects are made with a variety of shellac and natural resins.

== Agents of deterioration ==
=== Age ===
When it is produced, lacquer is a very durable substance, both waterproof and insoluble. With age, lacquer can begin to break down and deteriorate.

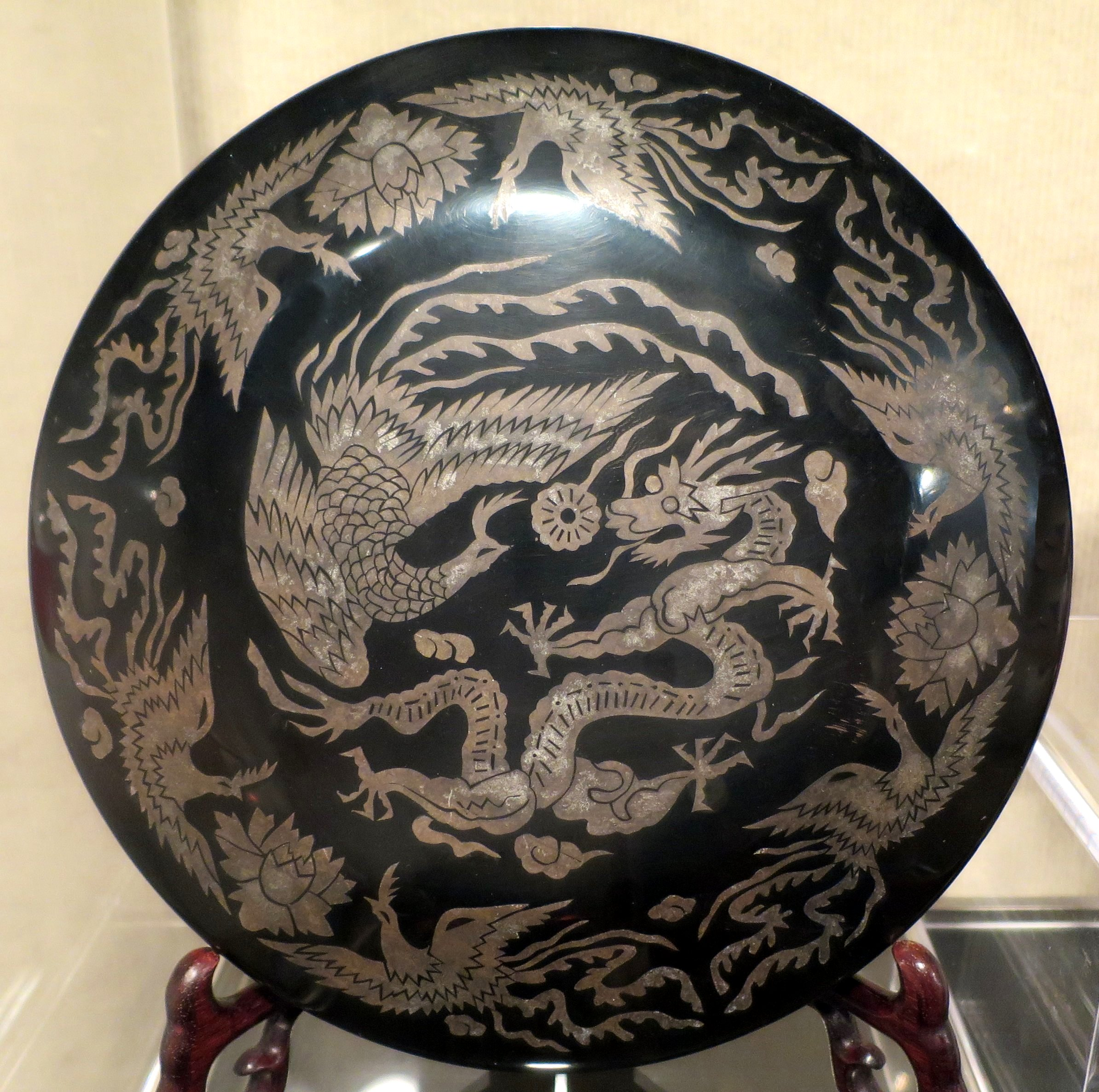
An example of Asian lacquerware: a 20th-century Chinese lacquer box

=== Light ===
Lacquerware is very sensitive to exposure to light, which causes photodegradation, fading and discoloration.

=== Water ===
Photodegraded lacquer is extremely sensitive to humidity and water. Exposure to water and other polar solvents can cause blanching, whitening of the surface from the formation of salts.

=== Temperature ===
High temperatures along with moisture can cause thermochromatic change to the lacquer surface.

=== Damage to the substrate ===
The supporting structure can be damaged or lost from the effects of expanding and contracting in changing environmental conditions, including temperature and humidity, from pest damage, or deterioration from age. The damaged support may cause warping, lifting or cracking of the lacquer coating.

=== Previous restoration ===
Previous restoration such as fills and overpainting can degrade and potentially damage original surfaces over time.

== Conservation ==
=== Preventive conservation ===
Preventive conservation measures can be used to avert damage to lacquerware caused by deterioration. Preventive methods may include limiting exposure to light to a maximum of 40 years at 100 lux or 80 years at 50 lux, maintaining stable temperature and humidity levels, using safe and proper art handling with gloves and proper art storage, per current professional museum standards such as those from the American Alliance of Museums.

=== Conservation treatment ===
Conservation treatment methods vary depending on the individual object and the materials used in its production. Asian lacquer and European lacquer have different chemical properties, and therefore require different materials and techniques for treatment. Prior to conservation treatment, conservators and conservation scientists analyze and document the properties of the work to determine the best methods and materials for its treatment. Professional conservators use codes of ethics for best practices, such as those from the American Institute for Conservation.

==== Eastern and Western techniques ====
Different conservation techniques are used to conserve Asian lacquerware in Eastern and Western cultures. Traditionally, Eastern cultures use Asian lacquer to repair damages and fill and consolidate losses. Asian lacquer is toxic and requires training and expertise to use. The material is also not easily reversible nor readily available to attain for conservation use. Western cultures, less familiar with the techniques of producing, applying or curing lacquer, typically use alternate materials for conservation treatment, particularly those that can be reversed with minimal risk to the original object.

===== Dry cleaning =====
Dry cleaning is the process of removing dirt and grime from the surface of the object without the use of solvents. Tools used for dry cleaning of lacquerware can include soft brushes, microfiber cloths, cotton swabs, and fine-celled absorbent sponges.

===== Wet cleaning =====
Wet cleaning is the process of further removal of dirt, grime and residue from the surface of the object that is not successfully removed by dry cleaning. Testing of various solvents should be done prior to wet cleaning the surface of the object in order to prevent possible damage to or removal of the original lacquer surface. Aqueous solvents with different pH levels will have varying levels of success in the removal of dirt and grime from the surface of the lacquer, and have various levels of risk of damaging the surface. This also depends on the condition of the object prior to cleaning. Nonpolar solvents are less likely to damage surfaces that have been photodegraded.

===== Consolidation =====
Consolidation is the process of stabilizing lifting and cracked areas of lacquer to minimize further damage and loss. Consolidants used can include Asian lacquer or other synthetic or organic adhesives such as animal glue or Paraloid B-72. Adhesives can be thinned with solvents in order to be wicked beneath layers of lifting lacquer or into cracks and allowed to dry while securing the loose area in place.

===== Filling losses =====
Different types of fill materials are used for European and Asian lacquerware. Losses caused by damage to the lacquer surface can be structural or aesthetic. Losses should only be filled if the surrounding areas are stable, without the potential of damage from the fill material. Trained Eastern conservators may choose to use Asian Lacquer as a fill for losses, while Western conservators may use alternate materials such as waxes, polyester resins and epoxy resins. Completed fills can then be inpainted to match the surrounding lacquer surface.

== Online resources and case studies ==
=== Online resources ===
Institution	Resource	Link
Asian Art Museum of San Francisco	Conservation of Asian Lacquer	https://web.archive.org/web/20160611044551/http://www.asianart.org/collections/conservation-of-asian-lacquer
American Institute for Conservation	Art Conservation Wiki - Lacquer	http://www.conservation-wiki.com/wiki/Lacquer
The Getty Institute	Characterization of Asian and European Lacquers	http://www.getty.edu/conservation/our_projects/science/lacquers/

=== Case studies ===
Institution	Conservation Treatment	Link
Victoria and Albert Museum	Conservation of the Mazarin Chest	http://www.vam.ac.uk/page/c/conservation-of-the-mazarin-chest/
Historic New England	Conservation of a Lacquer Sewing Table	http://www.historicnewengland.org/about-us/whats-new/inside-the-conservation-lab-asian-lacquer-treatment
