= Conservation and restoration of painting frames =

Preservation of heritage collections

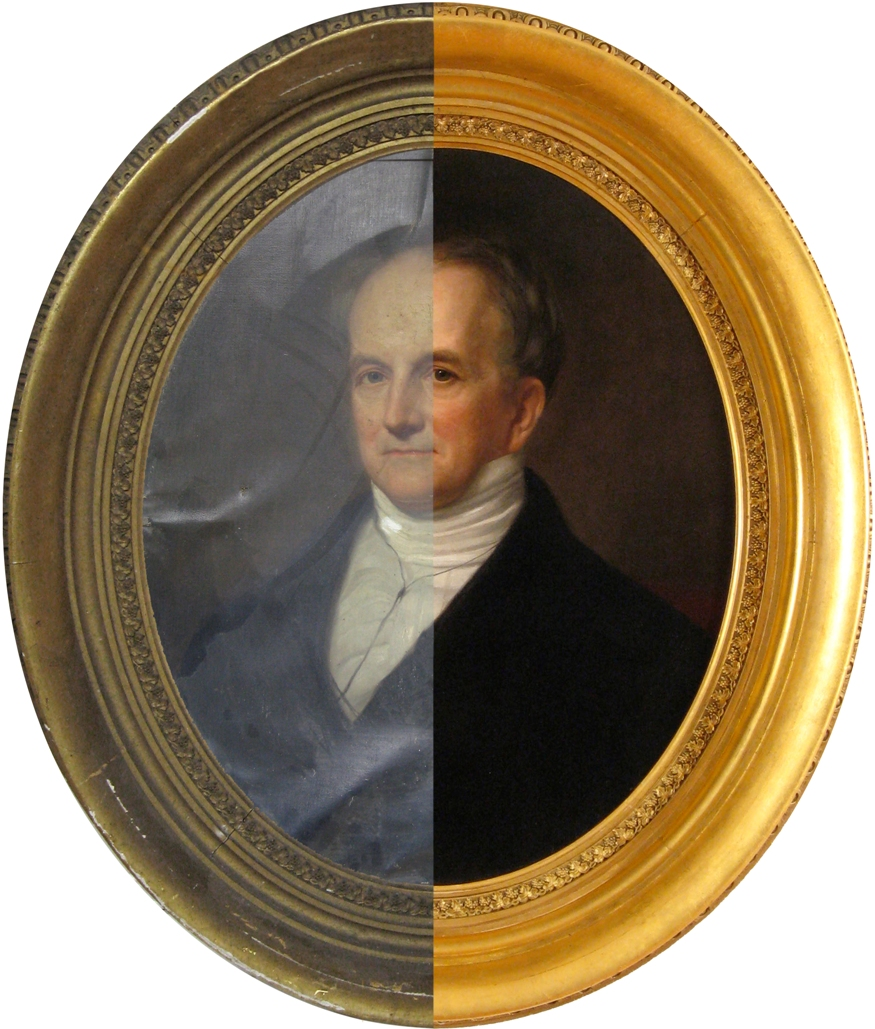
A frame before and after treatment

The conservation and restoration of painting frames is the process through which picture frames are preserved. Frame conservation and restoration includes general cleaning of the frame, as well as in depth processes such as replacing damaged ornamentation, gilding, and toning.

The purpose of painting frames is twofold. Frames function to protect and support the artwork as well as to visually enhance the item. Painting frames help us to appreciate and understand its role as it relates to the provenance of the painting. Original frames are often considered museum objects in their own right. As such, frames are subject to wear and tear in their functional roles as a protective component of the art. Regular activities that require the handling of artwork and their frames, such as exhibition, storage, travel, leave the frame susceptible to damage.

== Authenticity of frames ==
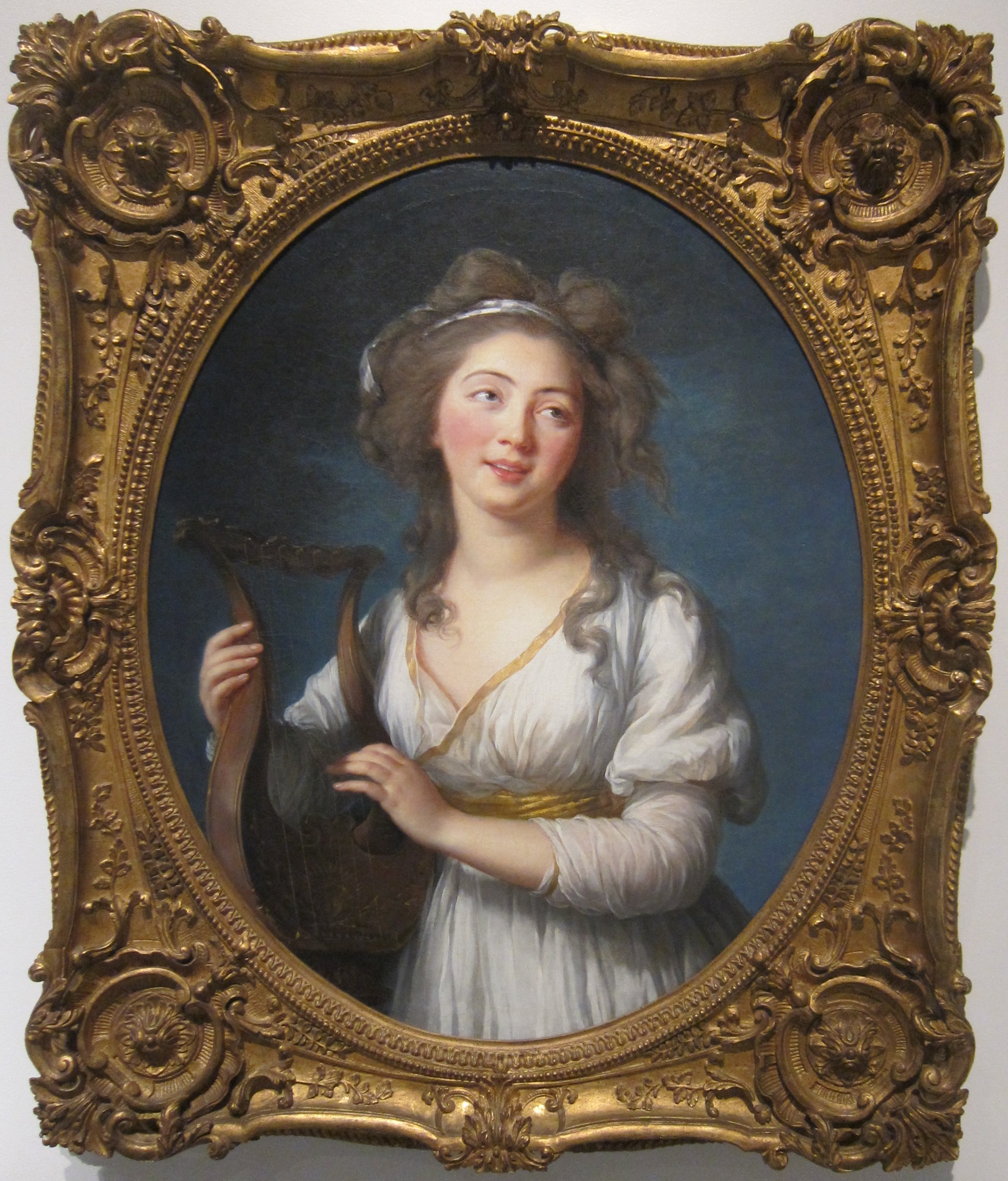
An example of a gilded frame with heavy ornamentation

Determining a frame's authenticity is important to understanding its relationship with the painting. A frame can be considered original or authentic to a painting if it meets one of several possible requirements. Those requirements are:

- If the frame was created, designed, or selected by the artist
- If the frame was selected by the first owner or dealer
- If the frame is a stylistically appropriate and of the same age as the painting
- If the frame is a "livery" or "gallery" frame
- If the frame is a replica

An authentic frame conveys the spirit of the time in which it was made. For the safety of the art, authentic frames can be modified to include glazing and backboards.

== Causes of deterioration ==
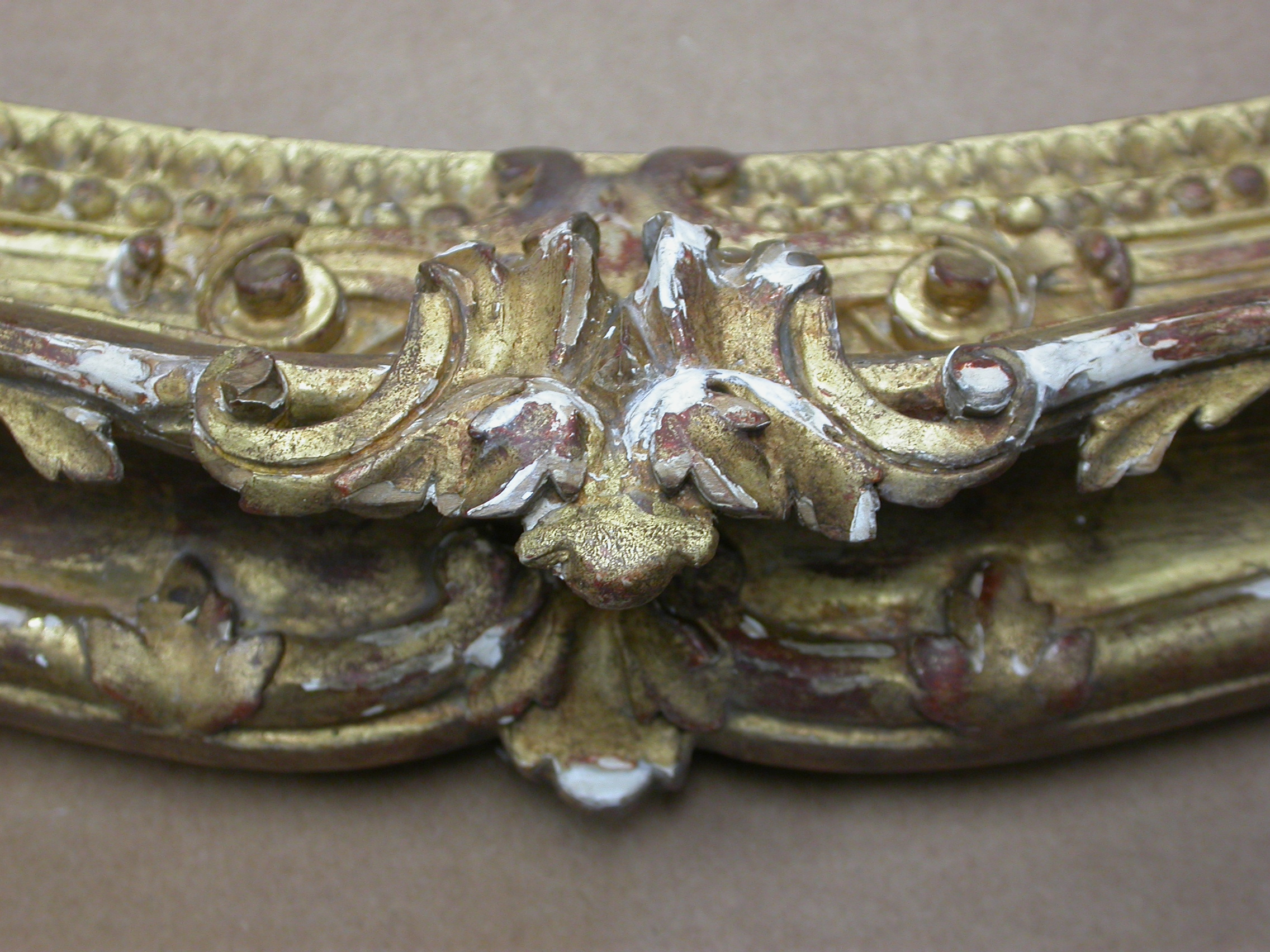
A close up of the damage inflicted upon a frame

Frequent handling, redecoration, modification, atmospheric pollution, and deterioration are some of the many issues that have given cause for conservators to specialize in the preservation of frames. Although wood is the most common material used in the creation of painting frames, other materials such as gesso, glass, plastic, and metal are also used. Each material is susceptible to deterioration and damage.

=== Inherent vice ===
Vices inherent to the material the frame is composed of poses potential risks. The most commonly used material used in the production of frames is wood. Wood is highly susceptible to environmental conditions, as well as infestation from pests and general deterioration. Likewise, metals are susceptible to rust, plastics are susceptible to deformity, and glass is susceptible to breakage. Each of these inherent vices can cause damage to the frame that must be addressed based on the frame's composition.

=== Humidity and temperature ===
Changes in humidity and temperature cause major structural damage to frames, such as warping and splitting. This damage makes the frame susceptible to loss of ornamentation from mishandling. In addition, the damage to the frame can endanger the art.

=== Adhesive ===
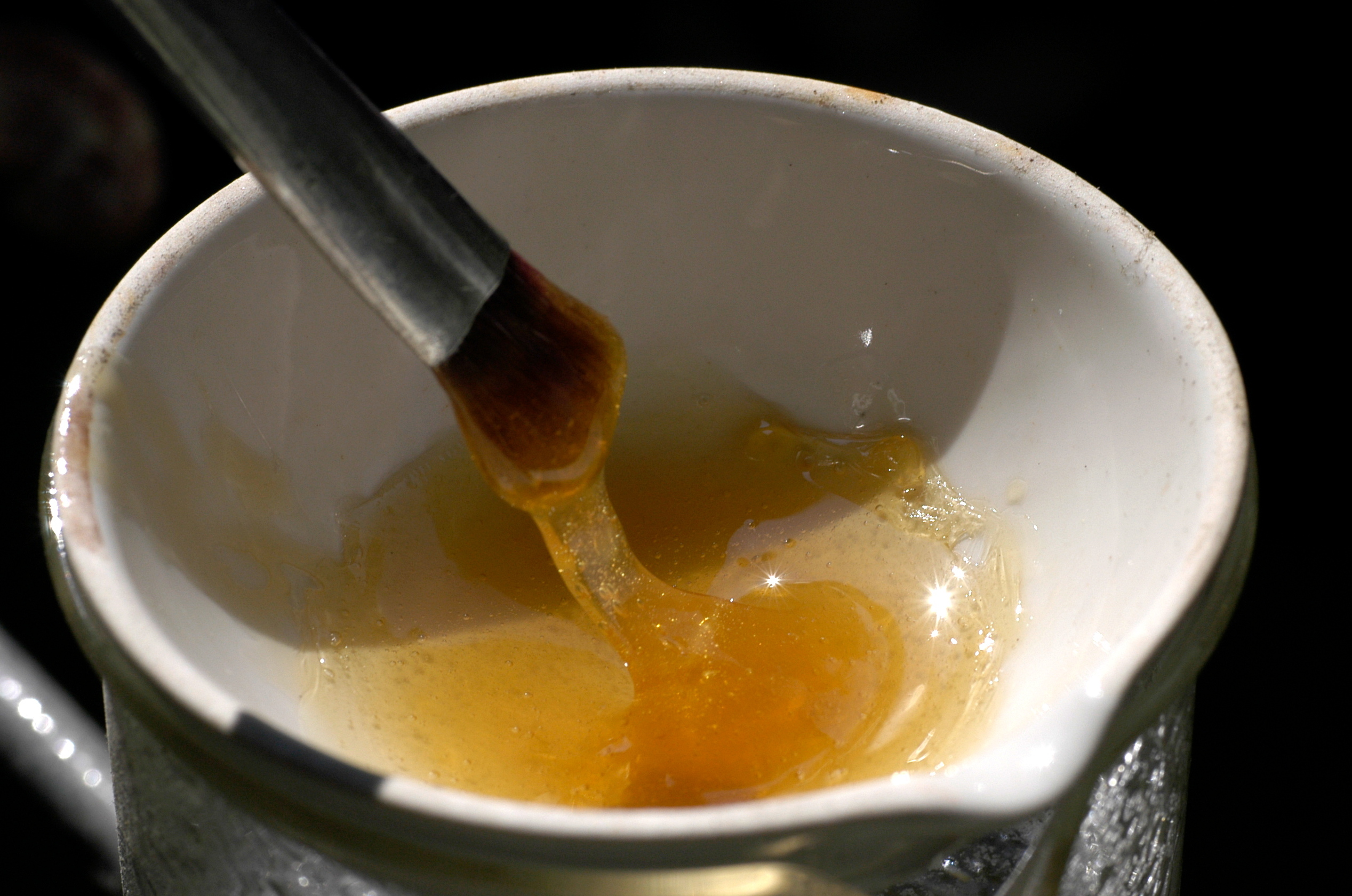
Animal glue

Deterioration of adhesives cause a frame's joins to split. Animal glues, which were typically used to join a frame together, are susceptible to changes in temperature and humidity, which may cause the adhesives to give due to the warping of the frame. It is also possible that the adhesives themselves might simply deteriorate over time.

=== Delamination ===
Delamination can occur on the surface of a painted or gilded frame. When moisture travels through a crack in the gilded or painted surface, the support is subsequently weakened and the gilded or painted layers begin to lift.

=== Air pollution ===
The industrialization of the 16th to the 18th century has led to increased air pollution in urban areas. Despite being indoors, paintings and their frames were susceptible to the damage from external air pollution. Other pollution risks include factors such as light, sneezing, and spillage.

=== Pests ===
Pests thrive off of organic materials such as wood and dust particles. General housekeeping will prevent the accumulation of dirt, dust, and other material that might attract pests. Integrated Pest Management (IPM) is a non-toxic approach that creates an inhospitable environment for pests.

== Conservation treatment ==
In order to best restore a frame to its intended appearance, conservators must blend traditional techniques with modern materials and approaches. The following treatments are common steps in the restoration of a frame:

=== Preventive treatment ===
The simplest step in treating a frame is dry dusting. Vacuums, sponges, erasers, brushes, and solvent wipes are all tools and methods that should be used regularly to prevent dust buildup.

=== Conservation and restoration ===
Taking an initial assessment of the frame will determine the extent of treatment needed. Below are some of the following steps that may be necessary in the following processes:

==== Disassembly ====
In some cases, the frame may require disassembly. Disassembly can reveal the frame's construction methods and give the conservator insight to the structural integrity of the frame. Disassembling the frame will also allow the conservator to assess damaged ornamentation and easily replicate necessary elements.

==== Cleaning ====
Testing small portions of the frame may be necessary to determine which method is best used to clean the frame. Possible materials used for cleaning include tri-ammonium citrate, Plextol B500, ethyl acrylate, EA, methyl methacrylate, and MMA.

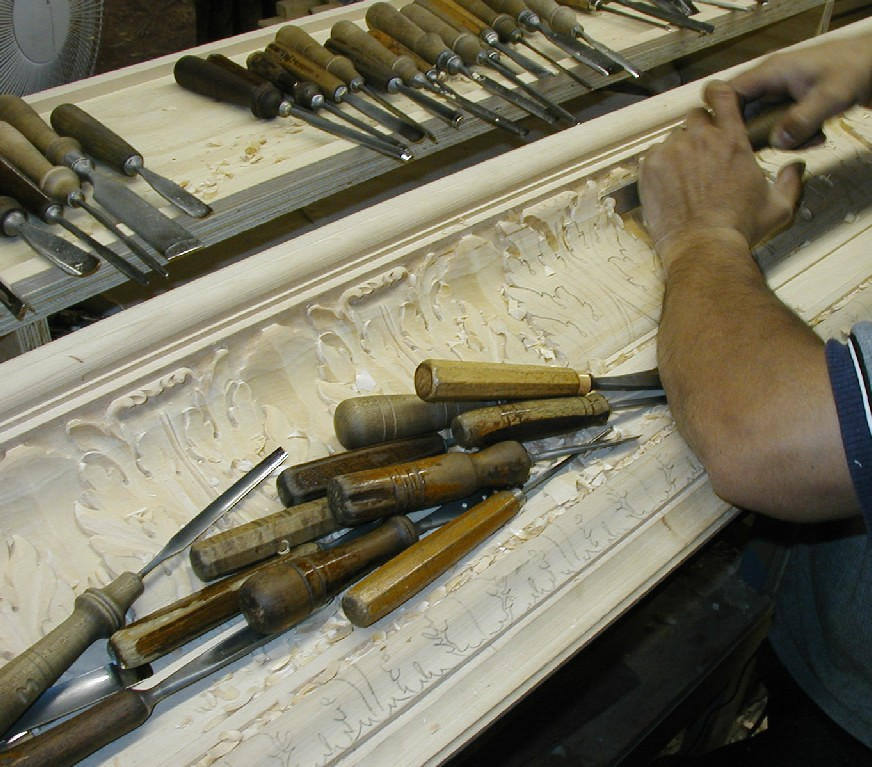
A carver reproduces the missing ornamentation on a frame.

==== Replacement of ornamentation ====
Lost or damaged ornamentation may need to be replaced. It is not uncommon to see ornamentation that has been clumsily re-adhered by past restorations that include unoriginal elements. Depending on the type of ornamentation and the extent of the damage, elements may need to be recarved by a master carver, recast in plaster, or infilled with a reversible gesso One common material used in the recreation of ornamentation is composition, a mixture of animal glue, resin, linseed oil, and venetian turpentine. Once major ornamentation elements have been repaired, it is necessary in a gilded frame to reapply and stabilize the flaking gesso layer with hot rabbit skin glue.

==== Gilding ====
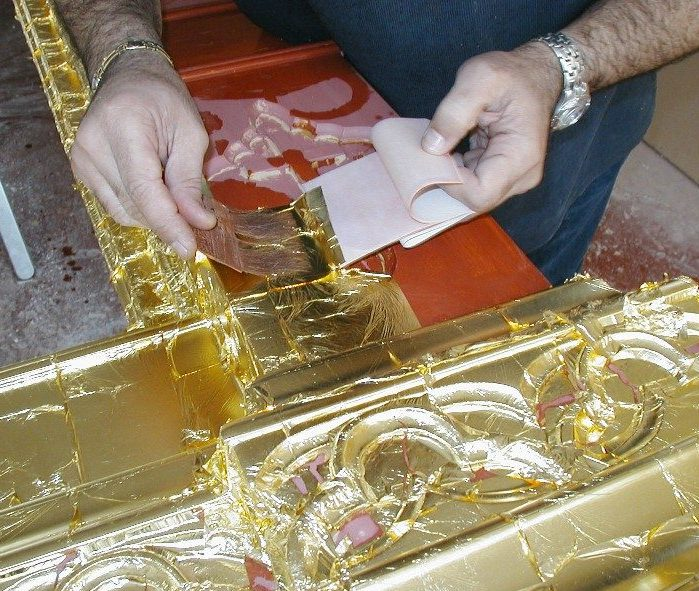
Gold leaf is applied to a frame.

Once major structural treatments have been performed and the gesso layer stabilized, it is necessary to assess the bole layer of the frame. Bole is a mixture of colored clay, glue size, and fat, which is applied on the frame as a base coat for the gilding. Typically, the bole layer, which is either red or gray, is revealed in the points of contact of the frame where the gilding has worn off. The color of the bole layer must be closely matched to that of the original bole, as the bole affects the overall tone of the frame.

It is essential to determine which gilding process was used before proceeding with the in-gilding process. The two common gilding processes are water gilding and oil gilding. The difference in the two processes is in adhesive coating base. Water gilding is the traditional, more difficult method, which must be cleaned using a mineral spirit or denatured alcohol. Oil gilding can be cleaned with a mild water-based soap solution.

==== Toning ====
Once the gold leaf has been applied, additional toning will be required to match the original gold. Toning is usually done by creating layers of color made out of animal glue and watercolor paint.

==== Rebuilding ====
In some cases, all or part of a frame is beyond repair. When this occurs, some conservators will reproduce antique machines to create an authentic replica that matches the period and style of the painting and original frame. This can also involve the use of 3D printing and scanning to recreate preexisting ornamentations.
