= Naïdé Ferchiou =

Tunisian archaeologist

- Born: July 1945 (age 80)
- Died: 2013
- Education: University of Tunisia
- Occupation: Archeologist

Naïdé Ferchiou (نايدي فرشيو) (July 1945 - 2013) was a Tunisian archaeologist whose work dealt mainly with Roman North Africa. She excavated at several important sites, including Abthugni.

== Education ==
In 1968 Ferchiou earned a laurea at the University of Tunisia with a thesis on the mausolea of the region of Maktar. In 1972 she received her doctorate at the Sorbonne with a dissertation entitled L'architecture romaine du Haut-Tell tunisien: recherches sur le rythme modulaire sur les thèmes décoratifs (Roman architecture of the Tunisian High Tell: research on the modular rhythm of decorative themes), under the supervision of Gilbert Charles-Picard, Roland Martin, and René Ginouvès. She finished her academic work with a State Doctorate in 1985 at the University of Aix-Marseille, with a thesis entitled L'évolution du décor architectonique en Afrique proconsulaire des derniers temps de Carthage aux Antonins (The Evolution of architectonic décor in Proconsular Africa from the late Carthaginian through the Antonine periods) under the direction of Pierre Gros and with Paul Albert Février, René Ginouvès, Gilbert Charles-Picard and Friedrich Rakob on the committee.

== Career ==
In 1983 she began to work at the National Institute for Tunisian Patrimony (لمعهد الوطني للتراث), first as maître de recherches and later as directeur de recherches, working with excavations, restoration and management of patrimony. Further she taught history of architecture at the University of Tunisia. She was a corresponding member of the German Archaeological Institute and associate researcher at the Institute of Research on Architecture (IRAA) of the French National Centre for Scientific Research (CNRS).

== Publications ==
=== Monographs ===
- Architecture romaine du Haut Tell Tunisien: recherches sur le rythme modulaire sur les thèmes décoratifs, ainsi que sur l’ornementation architecturale des mounements publics au second et troisième siècles de l’Empire (tesi di dottorato), Parigi 1972.
- Architecture romaine de Tunisie. L’ordre. Rythmes et proportions dans le Tell (Institut national d’archéologie et d’art. Bibliothèque archéologique, 2), Tunis 1975.
- L’evolution du décor architectonique en Afrique Proconsulaire des derniers temps de Carthage aux Antonins. L’Hellenisme africain, son déclin, ses mutations et le triomphe de l’art romano-africain, Gap 1989.
- Le chant des nymphes: Les aqueducs et les temples des eaux de Zaghouan à Carthage, Tunis 2008.

=== Shorter works ===
- Zaghouan et sa région (Centenaire de la municipalité de Zaghouan, 12 notices de la plaquette), Tunis 1990.
- Tunisie, carte routière archéologique, Tunis 1997.

=== Journal articles and contributions to conferences ===
- 1973:
  - "Carrières antiques du Djebel Aziz", in Annales des Mines et de la Géologie, 26, pp. 633–642.
- 1976:
  - "Une carrière régionale en Afrique. La pierre de Keddel", in Mitteilungen des Deutschen Archäologischen Instituts Römische Abteilung, 83, pp. 367–402.
- 1977:
  - "Quelques aspects d’une petite ville romano-africaine au Bas Empire. Exemple du Municipium Thadduritanum", in Cahiers de Tunisie, 25, 97–98, pp. 9–21.
  - "Note sur deux inscriptions du Jebel Mansour (Tunisie)", in Cahiers de Tunisie, 25,99-100, pp. 9–20.
- 1978:
  - "Cippes à personnages et à décor architectural de la région de Bou Arada (Tunisie)", in Cahiers de Tunisie,26,101-102, pp. 15–29.
  - "Témoignages du culte de Saturne dans le Jebel Mansour (Tunisie)", in Cahiers de Tunisie, 26,105-106, pp. 9–25.
- 1979:
  - "Sur la frange de la pertica de Carthage. La gens Bacchviana et le municipium Miz(eoter)", in Cahiers de Tunisie, 27,107-108, pp. 17–33.
  - "Trois petits jalons dans l’histoire du rinceau animé en Proconsulaire", in Antiquités Africaines, 13, pp. 235–247.
  - "Trois types de monuments funéraires situés dans ou sur les franges de l’ancien territoire de la Carthage punique", in Africa, 5–6, pp. 191–204.
  - "Un affranchi impérial julio-claudien aux environs de Bou Arada", in Echanges, 1,3 pp. 357–362.
- 1980:
  - "L’arc de Septime Sévère à Sbeïtla, in Echanges, 2,1, pp. 49-58.
  - "En marge de la réserve naturelle de l’Ichkeul. Note sur l’occupation antique du Jebel", in Echanges, 2,2, pp. 129–137.
  - "Préfets du prétoire et proconsul sous Constantin. Une dédicace d’arc en Afrique", in Echanges, 2,3, pp. 307–312.
  - "Une cité antique de la Dorsale tunisienne, aux confins de la Fossa Regia. Aïn Rchine et ses environs", in Antiquités Africaines, 15, pp. 231–259.
  - "Chapiteaux chrétiens de Tunisie. Variations sur un thème", in Bulletin Archéologique du Comité des Travaux Historiques et Scientifiques - Afrique du Nord, 8B [1976-1978], pp. 217–228.
  - "Sur quelques membres de la tribu Arnensis. Inscriptions de Henchir Romana (en Tunisie)", in Cahiers de Tunisie, 28,111-112, pp. 9–24.
  - "Remarques sur la politique impériale de colonisation en Proconsulaire, au cours du premier siècle après J.C.", in Cahiers de Tunisie, 28,113-114, pp. 9–55.
- 1981:
  - "Grandes stèles à décor architectural de la région de Bou Arada (Aradi), en Tunisie", in Mitteilungen des Deutschen Archäologischen Instituts. Römische Abteilung, 88, pp. 141–189.
  - "La mandragore, symbole funéraire sur des stèles antiques?", in Echanges, 3,2, pp. 261–265.
  - "Rinceaux antiques remployés dans la Grande Mosquée de Tunis. Parenté de leur style avec celui de certains monuments de Carthage", in Antiquités Africaines, 17, pp. 143–163.
  - "Quelques vestiges antiques d’Henchir El Oust", in Cahiers de Tunisie, 29,115-116, pp. 7–22.
  - "L’emprise de Carthage et la léthargie d’une région de Tunisie à l’époque romaine", in Actes du 2ème Congrès International d’Histoire et de Civilisation du Maghreb, in Cahiers de Tunisie, 29,117-118, pp. 439–463.
- 1982:
  - "Le mausolée d’Henchir es-Somâa près de Gafsa, ou les contradictions d’anciennes gravures", in Antiquités Africaines, 18, pp. 105–107.
  - "Une cité dirigée par des sufètes au temps de Commode. Civitas", in Cahiers de Tunisie, 30,119-120, pp. 15–42.
  - "Un entablement d’Apisa Minus daté du règne d’Antonin le Pieux", in Africa, 7–8, pp. 161–168.
  - "Note sur quelques vestiges de la colonie augustéenne de Sicca Veneria", in Mitteilungen des Deutschen Archäologischen Instituts. Römische Abteilung, 89, pp. 441–445.
  - "Architecture romaine de Bou Jelida (Tunisie). Un portique à colonnes de l’ancien municipium Miz(eo)t(er...)", in Latomus. Revue d’études latines, 41, pp. 850–856.
- 1983:
  - "Un atelier itinérant de marbriers le long des côtes de Proconsulaire", in Antiquités Africaines, 19, pp. 75–84.
  - "Le cippe de Sex. Rocius Bassus (environs d’Assuras, Tunisie)", in Cahiers de Tunisie, 31,123-124, pp. 7–11.
  - "Le Kbor Klib, Historique des fouilles", in Turath, 1, pp. 71–75.
- 1984:
  - "Gigthis à une époque mal connue, la phase julio-claudienne", in Actes du premier colloque international sur l’histoire et l’archéologie de l’Afrique du Nord (atti convegno Perpignan, 14-18 aprile 1981), in Bulletin Archéologique du Comité des Travaux Historiques et Scientifiques – Afrique du Nord, 17B, pp. 65–74.
  - "Les mausolées de Sidi Medien", in Turath, 2, pp. 12–17.
  - "A propos d’une inscription magique grecque. Le domaine de Sidi Kadou (région de Bou Arada) et son environnement. Etude d’archéologie et de géographie historique", in Cahiers de Tunisie, 32,127-128, pp. 9–29.
  - "Un décor architectonique du 2e siècle en Afrique Proconsulaire (Tunisie). Les vestiges du capitole de Numlulis", in British School at Rome. Papers, 52, pp. 115–123.
  - "La Civitas Thacensium (Tunisie). Aperçus sur l’évolution d’une petite cité liby-phénicienne au cours de l’antiquité, à travers les données archéologiques", in A. Mastino (a cura di), L’Africa romana. Atti del I convegno di studio (atti convegno Sassari, 16-17 dicembre 1983), Sassari, pp. 15–46.
- 1985
  - "Un petit monument de Mididi. Temple ou mausolée", in Antiquités Africaines, 21, pp. 159–172.
  - "Note sur une famille d’immigrants dans l’Antiquité", in Turath, 3, pp. 32–34.
  - "Quelques inédits de Furnos Majus (Afrique Proconsulaire). Nouvelles données sur l’évolution juridique de cette ville", in A. Mastino (a cura di), L’Africa romana. Atti del II convegno di studio (atti convegno Sassari, 14-16 dicembre 1984), Sassari, pp. 179–188.
  - "L’arc de Gordien III à Mustis (Le Krib, Tunisie)", in Africa, 9, pp. 95–139.
  - (con A. Gabillon), "Une inscription grecque magique de la région de Bou Arada (Tunisie), ou les quatre plaies de l’agriculture antique en Proconsulaire", in Actes du deuxième colloque international sur l’histoire et l’archéologie de l’Afrique du Nord (atti convegno Grenoble, 5-9 aprile 1983), in Bulletin Archéologique du Comité des Travaux Historiques et Scientifiques – Afrique du Nord, 19B, pp. 109–125.
- 1986:
  - "Nouvelles données sur un fossé inconnu en Afrique proconsulaire et sur la Fossa Regia", in Histoire et archéologie de l'Afrique du Nord: actes du IIIe colloque international réuni dans le cadre du 110e Congrès National des Sociétés Savantes (atti convegno Montpellier, 1-5 aprile 1985), Paris, pp. 351–365.
  - "Le site d’El Kantara (Meninx?) à Jerba", in Actes du Colloque sur l’histoire de Jerba (atti convegno aprile 1982), Tunis, pp. 11–15.
  - "Une zone de petite colonisation romaine à l’époque julio-claudienne. Le centre-ouest de l’Africa vetus (région d’Aradi, Avitina, dj. Mansour, Siliana)", in A. Mastino (a cura di), L’Africa romana. Atti del III convegno di studio (atti convegno Sassari, 13-15 dicembre 1985), Sassari, pp. 205–217.
  - "Niveaux numides découverts à Mustis", in Reppal. Revue des études phéniciennes-puniques et des antiquités libyques, 2, pp. 277–285.
  - "Groupe de reliefs à décor architectonique", in Mitteilungen des Deutschen Archäologischen Instituts. Römische Abteilung, 93, pp. 327–343.
  - "Aperçus et hypothèses de travail sur les colonies juliennes et les pagi de Carthage au Ier siècle apr. J.C.", in Cahiers de Tunisie, 34,137-138, pp. 5–29.
  - "L’évolution du décor architectonique en Afrique proconsulaire des derniers temps de Carthage aux Antonins", in Centre d'Etudes et de Documentation Archéologique de la Conservation de Carthage (CEDAC) Carthage Bulletin, 7, pp. 8–9.
  - "Le mausolée anonyme de Thuburnica", in Mélanges de l’École française de Rome: Antiquité, 98,2, pp. 665–705.
- 1987:
  - "Le mausolée de C. Iulius Felix à Henchir Messaouer", in Mitteilungen des Deutschen Archäologischen Instituts. Römische Abteilung, 94, pp. 413–463.
  - "Le sanctuaire punique de Carthage, dit «Chapelle Carton» (Salammbô)", in Centre d'Etudes et de Documentation Archéologique de la Conservation de Carthage (CEDAC) Carthage Bulletin, 8, pp. 13-17.
  - "Un problème d’éclairage historique: le cas des tumulus et des bazinas de l’ancien territoire de la Carthage punique", in Reppal. Revue des études phéniciennes-puniques et des antiquités libyques, 3, pp. 186–191.
  - "Le paysage funéraire pré-romain dans deux régions céréalières de Tunisie antique (Fahs-Bou Arada et Tebourba-Mateur). Les tombeaux monumentaux", in Antiquités Africaines, 23, pp. 13–70.
  - "Les mausolées augustéens d’Assuras (Zanfour, Tunisie)", in Mélanges de l’École française de Rome: Antiquité, 99,2, pp. 767–821.
  - "Deux témoignages de l’architecture religieuse et funéraire de la Carthage hellénistique", in Rivista di Studi Fenici, 15,1, pp, 15-45.
- 1988:
  - "A propos de trois inscriptions inédites provenant de la Tunisie centrale", in A. Mastino (a cura di), L’Africa romana. Atti del III convegno di studio (atti convegno Sassari, 11-13 dicembre 1987), Sassari, pp. 143–151.
  - "Le temple de Mercure à Gigthis. Recherches sur le décor architectonique", in Africa, 10, pp. 174–196.
  - "Entre l’histoire des religions et la psychanalyse, le Tannhäuser de Richard Wagner: relecture d’un livret", in Africa, 9, pp. 317–324.
  - "Le grand temple de Vallis et sa place dans l’architecture de la province romaine d’Afrique", in Revue Archéologique, 1988,1, pp. 41–50.
  - "L’architecture pré-romaine d’Uzali Sar (Hr Djal) (Tunisie): observations preliminaires", in Reppal. Revue des études phéniciennes-puniques et des antiquités libyques, 4, pp, 215–239.
  - "Note sur un chapiteau ionique de Carthage", in Centre d'Etudes et de Documentation Archéologique de la Conservation de Carthage (CEDAC) Carthage Bulletin, 9, pp, 38–39.
- 1989:
  - "Le site antique d’Abthugnos. Les nouvelles données. Premier aperçu", in Bulletin des Travaux de l’Institut National du Patrimoine, 3, pp. 121–129.
  - "Le mausolée de Q. Apuleus Maxssimus à elAmrouni", in British School at Rome. Papers, 57, pp. 47–76.
  - "Répertoire décoratif de l’Afrique Proconsulaire. Deux thèmes répandus sur la côte, leur évolution et leur diffusion", in Antiquités Africaines, 25, pp. 115–133.
  - "A propos d’un fragment récemment découvert: hypothèse sur la parrure ornementale de la Carthage augustéenne. Son existence, sa disparition", in Centre d'Etudes et de Documentation Archéologique de la Conservation de Carthage (CEDAC) Carthage Bulletin, 10, pp. 14–15.
  - "Les environs d’Henchir Tout, hors des courants civilisationnels romano-africains. La problématique d’un paysage humain", in Bulletin des travaux de l’Institut National du Patrimoine, 3, pp. 7–17.
- 1990:
  - "L’habitat fortifié pré-impérial en Tunisie antique: aperçus sur la typologie des sites perchés et des sites de versant, illustrés par quelques exemples", in Carthage et son territoire dans l’antiquité. Histoire et archéologie de l’Afrique du Nord. Actes du IVe Colloque International réuni dans le cadre du 113e Congrès national des Sociétés savantes (atti convegno Strasbourg, 5-9 aprile 1988), Paris, pp. 229–252.
  - "Un témoignage de la vie municipale d’Abthugni au Bas Empire", in A. Mastino (a cura di), L’Africa romana. Atti del VII convegno di studio (atti convegno Sassari, 15-17 dicembre 1989), Sassari, pp. 753–761.
  - "Un fossé inconnu en Afrique Proconsulaire: Suite des recherches", in Reppal. Revue des études phéniciennes-puniques et des antiquités libyques, 5, pp. 107–115.
  - "Habitats fortifiés pré-impériaux en Tunisie antique", in Antiquités Africaines, 26, pp. 43–86.
  - "Le monument funéraire de Numisi a Marcellina. Problèmes de typologie", in Antiquités Africaines, 26, pp. 217–221.
  - "A propos d’une nouvelle découverte épigraphique à Henchir el Oust", in Bulletin des travaux de l’Institut National du Patrimoine, 5, pp. 145–146.
- 1990-1991:
  - "A propos de deux sites de Tunisie antique: recherches sur le paysage humain et sur la typologie des habitats", in Bulletin des travaux de l’Institut National du Patrimoine, 6, pp. 137–180.
- 1991:
  - "Architecture et urbanisme de la région de Segermes: recherches au Dj. Zid et à Ksar Soudane", in Bulletin des travaux de l’Institut National du Patrimoine, 4, pp. 89–99.
  - "Le Kbor Klib", in Quaderni di Archeologia della Libia, 14, pp, 45-97.
  - "Le paysage funéraire pré-romain (région de Fahs – Bou Arada et vallée de la Medjerda – Oued Khalled). Les tombeaux monumenteaux", in Reppal. Revue des études phéniciennes-puniques et des antiquités libyques, 6, pp. 55–69.
  - "Stucs puniques hellénistiques de Carthage", in 4. Internationales Kolloquium zur römischen Wandmalerei (atti convegno Köln, 20-23 settembre 1989), in Kölner Jahrbuch für Vor- und Frühgeschichte, 24, pp. 19–26.
  - "L’occupation du sud de la province romaine d’Afrique au 1er siècle", in Actes du Ve Colloque International d’Histoire et de Civilisation du Maghreb, in Cahiers de Tunisie, 39,155-156, pp. 65–104.
- 1992-1993:
  - "A propos d’un bloc d’architrave à soffite figuré au Musée du Bardo", in Africa, 11–12, pp. 19–30.
  - "Note sur les chapiteaux figurés de Segermes", in Africa, 11–12, pp. 49–60.
  - "L’arc double à trois baies de Mustis", in Africa, 11–12, pp. 277–363.
- 1993:
  - "Les éléments architectureaux (1990)", in: S. T. Stevens (a cura di), Bir El Knissia at Carthage: a rediscovered cemetery church Report no. 1 (Journal of Roman Archaeology Supplementary Series 7), Ann Arbor MI, pp. 225–255.
- 1994:
  - "Le paysage proto-historique et pré-impérial à l’est et au sud de Zaghouan (Tunisie)", in Antiquités Africaines, 30, pp. 7–55.
  - "A propos d’un inventaire des sites et des monuments. Deux notices de villes", in A. Mastino, P. Ruggeri (a cura di), L’Africa romana. Atti del X convegno di studio (atti convegno Oristano, 11-13 dicembre 1992), Sassari, pp. 463–497.
  - "Recherches sur les éléments architecturaux", in G. Hellenkemper Salies, H.-H.von Prittwitz und Graffon, G. Bauchhenß (a cura di), Das Wrack. Der antike Schiffsfund von Mahdia' (Band 1), Köln, pp. 195–208.
- 1995:
  - "Un domaine antique à l’ouest de Thadduri", in Cahiers de Tunisie, 41,164, [1993], pp. 13–24.
  - "Recherches sur la toponymie antique de la basse vallée de la Medjerda (Région d’Utique – Bizerte)", in Africa, 13, pp. 83–93.
  - "Architecture funéraire de Tunisie à l’époque romaine", in P. Trousset (a cura di), Monuments funéraires. Institutions autochtones. L’Afrique du Nord antique et médiévale. VIe Colloque sur l’histoire de l’Afrique du Nord (atti convegno Pau, ottobre 1993), I, Paris, pp. 111–138.
  - "Le paysage pré-impérial dans une zone de contact: percée de l’Oued Kébir sortant de la Dorsale tunisienne pour aborder la plaine de Thuburbo Majus", in Reppal. Revue des études phéniciennes-puniques et des antiquités libyques, 9, pp. 49–62.
  - "Recherches sur le décor architectonique de la région de Segermes", in S. Dietz, L. Ladjimi Sebaï, H. Ben Hassen (a cura di), Africa Proconsularis. Regional Studies in the Segermes Valley of Northern Tunesia II, Copenhagen, pp. 653–711.
  - "Le paysage pré-romain en Tunisie antique à l’Ouest de Carthage", in M.H. Fantar, M. Ghaki M. (a cura di), Actes du IIIe Congrès International des Études Phéniciennes et Puniques (atti convegno Tunis, 11-16 novembre 1991), I, Tunis, pp. 435–445.
  - "La problématique de la recherche archéologique en Tunisie", in Actes du 1er congrès international sur le rôle des institutions de recherches en sciences humaines et sociales dans les pays arabes et en Turquie (atti convegno Zaghouan 1995), Tunis, pp. 33–40.
  - "Stucs puniques hellénistiques d’Utique", in Antiquités Africaines, 31, pp. 53–79.
  - "Camps et vétérans dans la moyenne vallée de l’Oued Miliane. Les pagi Fortunalis et Mercurialis et la colonie d'Uthina", in Mélanges de l’École française de Rome: Antiquité, 107,1, pp. 137–181.
  - "Le système défensif de la moyenne vallée de l’oued Miliane dans l’antiquité", in Cahiers de Tunisie, 43,169-170, pp. 53–60.
- 1996:
  - "Glanes épigraphiques dans la région de Fahs-Bou Arada", in M. Khanoussi, P. Ruggeri, C. Vismara (a cura di), L’Africa romana. Atti dell'XI convegno internazionale di studio (atti convegno Cartagine, 15-18 dicembre 1994), Ozieri, pp. 1329–1339.
  - "La prospection Tuniso-danoise dans la région de Segermes: méthodologie de la recherche et méthodologie de la coopération", in A. Temimi (a cura di), Actes du IIe congrès international sur Méthodologie occidentale en sciences humaines et sociales dans les pays arabes et en Turquie (atti convegno Zaghouan 1996), Tunis, pp. 53–61.
- 1997:
  - "Un témoignage de l’occupation humaine à l’époque musulmane dans l’Afrique oubliée: l’exemple de Henchir Souar", in Actes du 1er congrès pour un corpus d’archéologie ottomane dans le monde ottoman (atti convegno Zaghouan 1996), Zaghouan, pp. 57–60.
  - "Contribution à l’histoire du site d’Assuras: aperçu préliminaire sur un sanctuaire de tradition pré-romaine", in Reppal. Revue des études phéniciennes-puniques et des antiquités libyques, 10, pp. 53.
  - "Abthugnos, ville de Proconsulaire au IVe siècle, d’après une inscription nouvellement découverte", in Bulletin Archéologique du Comité des Travaux Historiques et Scientifiques - Afrique du Nord, 24 [1993-1995], pp. 197–202.
  - "À propos d’un monument énigmatique de Tunisie antique", in Mitteilungen des Deutschen Archäologischen Instituts. Römische Abteilung, 104, pp. 335–340.
- 1998:
  - "Fossa Regia", in Encyclopédie Berbère, 19, Paris - Leuven - Dudley MA, pp. 2897–2911 (testo on line).
  - "Quelques réflexions sur la coopération archéologique en Tunisie", in La coopération entre l’Europe, le monde arabe & la Turquie en sciences humaines & sociales. Actes du IIIe congrès international de la recherche scientifique (atti convegno Zaghouan 1997), Zaghouan, pp. 47–50.
  - "Réplique à la note critique de Leila Ladjimi-Sebaï et Habib Ben Hassen, relative à mon article, La prospection tuniso-danoise dans la région de Segermes", in La coopération entre l’Europe, le monde arabe & la Turquie en sciences humaines & sociales. Actes du IIIe congrès international de la recherche scientifique (atti convegno Zaghouan 1997), Zaghouan, pp. 141–144.
  - "Aïn Fourna, antique Furnos Maius, ville de confins territoriaux, porte du Haut Tell", in Africa, 16, pp. 31–58.
  - "Recherches sur l’iconographie religieuse dans l’ancien territoire de la Carthage punique. Un fronton de chapelle de la région de Bou Arada (Tunisie)", in Antiquités Africaines, 34, pp. 57–63.
- 1999:
  - "Henchir Romana. L’histoire d’un petit site en bordure de la Fossa Regia, de l’époque punique à celle de Byzance", in Reppal. Revue des études phéniciennes-puniques et des antiquités libyques, 11, pp. 63–75.
  - "Les aqueducs de Zaghouan à Carthage, et leurs structures complémentaires. Note préliminaire", in Africa, 17, pp. 69–86.
- 2000:
  - "Le nymphée de Zaghouan", in Astrolabe, 66, pp. 4–5.
  - "Recherche sur le paysage humain antique dans le centre nord-est de l’Afrique proconsulaire, entre Abthugnos et Coreva (résumé)", in Africa, 18, pp. 67–75.
  - "Découvertes archéologiques d’époque islamique à Bir Mcherga", in Monuments ottomans: Restauration et conservation. Actes du IIIème Congrès international du Corpus d’archéologie ottomane dans le monde, Zaghouan.
- 2001:
  - "Histoire antique et architecture dans la Haute Steppe en Afrique Proconsulaire", in F. Bejaoui (a cura di), Histoire des Hautes Steppes. Antiquité - Moyen Age. Actes du colloque de Sbeitla. Sessions 1998 et 1999, Tunis, pp. 7–22.
  - "Mise en valeur de sites archéologiques encore inexploités", in N. Sekik (a cura di), Patrimoine et co-développement durable en Méditerranée occidentale (gouvernance environnementale). Actes du Séminaire International (atti convegno Tunis- Hammamet, 23-27 maggio 2000), Tunis, pp. 159–170.
- 2002:
  - "Les fastes de l’esclave Iucundus", in M. Khanoussi, P. Ruggeri, C. Vismara (a cura di), L’Africa Romana. Lo spazio marittimo del Mediterraneo occidentale. Geografia storica ed economia. Atti del XIV convegno di studio (atti convegno Sassari, 7-10 dicembre 2000), Roma, pp. 1693–1699.
  - "Note sur deux stèles néopuniques. La région de Siliana", in Reppal. Revue des études phéniciennes-puniques et des antiquités libyques, 12, pp. 57–63.
  - "Architecture, urbanisme et topographie: Le grand temple du Dj. Moraba", in Africa, 19, pp. 5–18.
  - (con S. Khosrof), "History of the aqueduct and general aspects of its preservation", in Africa, 19, pp. 19–28.
  - (con L. Ladjimi Sebaï), "Stabilité politique et prospérité économique de l’Afrique au Bas-Empire à travers un texte inédit provenant de Hr el Oust (Tunisie)", in Africa, 19, pp. 29–45.
- 2002-2003:
  - "Recherches sur l’iconographie funéraire d’Afrique Proconsulaire. Représentations de jeunes gens debout auprès d’un cheval", in Antiquités Africaines, 38–39, pp. 97–108.
  - "Henchir Bez, l’antique Vazi Sarara", in Antiquités Africaines, 38–39, pp. 415–421.
- 2003:
  - "Nouvelles données sur la vie religieuse dans la cité antique de Giufi (Bir Mcharga), in M. Khanoussi (a cura di), L’Afrique du Nord antique et médievale. Protohistoire, les cités de l’Afrique du Nord. Fouilles et prospections récents. VIIIe colloque international sur l’histoire et l’archéologie de l’Afrique du Nord. 1er colloque international sur l’histoire et l’archéologie du Maghreb (atti convegno Tabarka, 8-13 maggio 2000), Tunis, pp. 151-164.
  - "L’activité d’officines de marbriers venues de Carthage à Sufetula. Le cas des temples capitolins et de la porte du forum, in F. Bejaoui (a cura di), Histoire des Hautes Steppes. Antiquité - Moyen Age. Actes du colloque de Sbeitla. Session 2001, Tunis, pp. 93-100.
  - "Le nymphée d’Aïn Jouggar et l’aqueduc de Kaoussat (Tunisie)", in M. B. Ben Mami M.B. (a cura di), Africa. Série Séances scientifiques, I, Tunis, pp. 71–86.
- 2004:
  - "Baracho, arrière petit-fils de Romulus, ou la punicisation d’une famille romaine", in M. Khanoussi, P. Ruggeri, C. Vismara (a cura di), L’Africa Romana. Ai confini dell’impero. Contatti, scambi, conflitti. Atti del XV convegno di studio (atti convegno Tozeur, 11-15 dicembre 2002), Roma, pp. 1325–1330.
  - "Le mausolée-tour de Ksar Bou Kriss", in Africa, 20, pp. 99–108.
  - "A propos de deux élements en grès dunaire du Quaternaire Marin, découverts dans l’ancien territoire de la Carthage punique (Région de Bou Arada et de Bir Mcherga)", in Reppal. Revue des études phéniciennes-puniques et des antiquités libyques, 13, pp. 129–134.
  - "L’habitat fortifié numide de l’Henchir Bou Nader (Région des Salines, en Tunisie centrale)", in Reppal. Revue des études phéniciennes-puniques et des antiquités libyques, 13, pp. 135–147.
  - "Recherches sur le cadre géographique et historique de la région de Zama", in N. Kallala (a cura di), Africa. Série Séances scientifiques, II, Tunis, pp. 187–212.
  - "Architecture, urbanisme et topographie: à propos de trois villes de l’ancien territoire de la Carthage punique: Sululos, Henchir Debbik, Seressi", in N. Kallala (a cura di), Africa. Série Séances scientifiques, II, Tunis, pp. 213–239.
- 2005:
  - "Le centre monumental d’Abthugnos. Recherches sur l’identification des monuments, in N. Kallala (a cura di), Africa. Série Séances scientifiques, III, Tunis, pp.181-206.
- 2006:
  - "A propos d’un lot d’éléments architecturaux en provenance d’Haïdra et autrefois déposés au Musée du Bardo. Recherches sur le décor architectonique mineur de la ville", in: F. Bejaoui (a cura di), Actes du 4ème Colloque Internationale sur l’Histoire des Steppes Tunisiennes. Sbeitla. Session 2003, Tunis, pp. 83–104.
- 2007:
  - "Recherches sur le décor architectonique attribué au capitole d’Althiburos et la question de sa datation", in Africa, 21, pp. 95–121.
- 2008:
  - "Un sanctuaire de sommet à Furnos Maius, note préliminare", in J. González, P. Ruggeri, C. Vismara, R. Zucca (a cura di), L’Africa romana. Le richezze dell’Africa. Risorse, produzioni, scambi. Atti del XVII convegno di studio (atti convegno Sevilla, 14-17 dicembre 2006), Roma, pp. 917–933.
  - "Les trois tombeaux monumentaux puniques de l’Henchir Djaouf (région de Zagouan). Le dessin du comte Borgia et les nouvelles données archéologiques", in Comptes rendus des séances de l’Académie des Inscriptions et Belles-Lettres, 2008, pp. 357–389 (ristampato anche in altra sede nel 2010)
  - "Le grand Nymphée de Zaghouan. Matériaux et techniques de construction", in Africa, 22, pp. 189–200.
- 2009:
  - "Les nymphées de Zaghouan et de Jouggar. Recherches préliminaires sur les travaux d’aménagement du Grand aqueduc alimentant Carthage à l’époque des Sévères", in Contrôle et distribution de l’eau dans le Maghreb antique et médiéval (Collection de l’Ecole française de Rome, 426), Rome, pp. 199–233.
  - "Recherches sur le mausolée hellénistique d’Hinchīr Būrgū", in E. Fentress. A. Drine, R. Holud et al., An Island Through Time: Jerba. Studies 1. The Punic and Roman Periods (Journal of Roman Archaeology. Supplementary Series, 71), Portsmouth, Rhode Island, pp. 107–128.
  - "Other material. A Hellenistic cistern-head", in E. Fentress. A. Drine, R. Holud et al., An Island Through Time: Jerba. Studies 1. The Punic and Roman Periods (Journal of Roman Archaeology. Supplementary Series, 71), Portsmouth, Rhode Island, pp. 333–334.
- 2010:
  - "Les trois tombeaux monumentaux puniques de l’Henchir Djaouf (région de Zagouan). Le dessin du comte Borgia et les nouvelles données archéologiques", in J. Leclant, F. Déroche (a cura di), Monuments et cultes funéraires d’Afrique du Nord. Actes de la IVe Journée d’études nord-africaines organisée par l'Académie des Inscriptions et Belles-Lettres et la Société d'étude du Maghreb préhistorique, antique et médiéval (atti convegno, Palais de l’Institut, 28 marzo 2008), Paris, pp. 151–183 (già stampato in altra sede nel 2008).
  - "A propos de quelques représentations cultuelles et votives de l’ancien territoire de la Carthage punique", in A. Ferjaoui (a cura di), Carthage et les autochtones de son empire du temps de Zama. Colloque international (atti convegno Siliana e Tunisi, 10-13 marzo 2004). ''Hommage à Mhamed Hassine Fantar, Institut National du Patrimoine et l’Association de Sauvegarde du site de Zama, Tunis, pp. 479-507.
  - "A propos de quelques éléments d’architecture de Gabès, l’antique Tacapes", in Histoire et patrimoine du littoral tunisien. Actes du 1er séminaire (atti convegno Nabeul 28-29 novembre 2008), Tunis, pp. 161-174.
- 2010-2012:
  - "Nouvelles données sur la cité d’Aïn Rchine (Tunisie). Monuments, dédicace à Pluton faite par des sufètes, bas-relief", in Antiquités Africaines, 46-48, pp. 147-161
- 2011:
  - "A propos de quelques éléments d’architecture de Zama. Le problème de la diffusion de la culture punique dans l’arrière-pays de Carthage (de Mateur à Siliana)", in A. Ferjaoui (a cura di), La Carthage Punique. Diffusion et permanence de sa culture en Afrique antique. Actes du 1er Séminaire (atti convegno Tunis 28 dicembre 2008), Tunis, pp. 131-183.
  - "Dédicace d’un temple consacré a ux Cereres (environs de Seressi, Tunisie)", in C. Deroux (a cura di), Corolla epigraphica. Hommages au professeur Yves Burnand(Collection Latomus, 331), Bruxelles, pp. 491-499.
- 2013:
  - "Recherches sur le paysage urbain du lieu dit Dhorbania, l’antique Thambaia, et sa région", in Africa, 23, pp. 155-178.

=== Non-archaeological writings ===
- Ombres carthaginoises, Paris 1988 (ristampato nel 1993).
- La Mort de César, Tunis 2013.

== Bibliography ==
- Roald Docter, "In memoriam Naïdé Ferchiou (1945-2013)", in Carthage Studies, 7, 2013, pp. 7-20 (text on line)
- "Disparition: Naïdé Ferchiou, une grande figure de l'archéologie tunisino", articolo del 17 luglio 2013 sul giornale Leader (testo on line)
