= Book rebinding =

Reassembling a book for renewal purposes

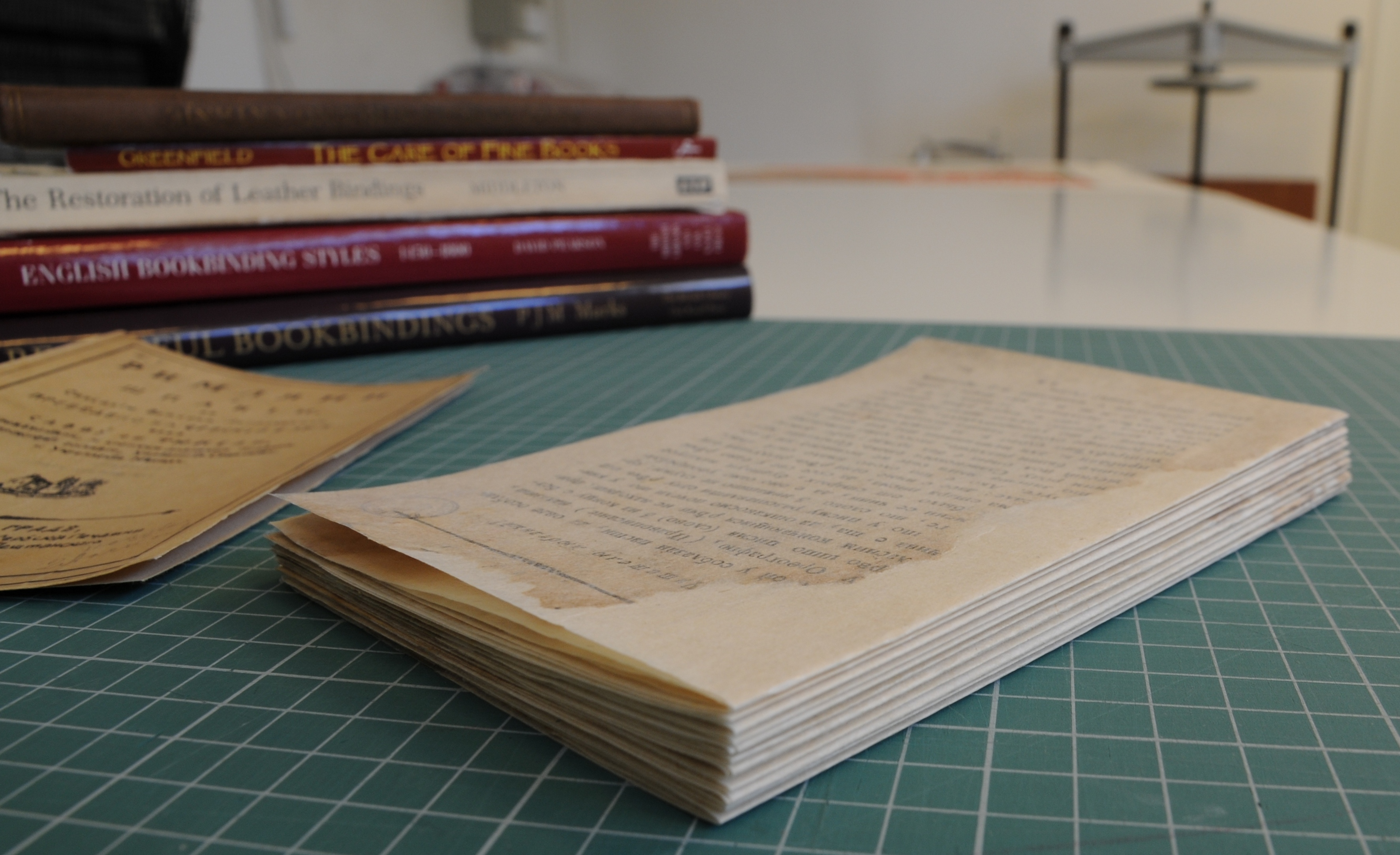
A book whose pages have been restored, which is now ready for rebinding

Book rebinding is the renewal or replacement of the cover of a book. Typically, this requires restitching or renewal of the glue which holds the pages in place.

Libraries may rebind books for durability or archival purposes, or for repair.

Collectors of antique books such as incunabula have often had items rebound. This might be done to improve their appearance by rebinding in a more fashionable colour or to assert ownership by having the book rebound in uniform covers which were stamped with an insignia such as a coat of arms. One prominent collector who had this done was Earl Spencer. For example, when he acquired a medieval psalter of 1457, which was bound in pigskin on wooden boards, he had it rebound in mauve velvet over cardboard. The Bodelian Library rebound additions to its collection for functional reasons—to indicate value and importance. The Bibliothèque nationale de France requested 6600 francs for bookbinding in Year VIII of the revolutionary calendar, "those which come from our conquests in Germany and Italy, and while infinitely precious, they have arrived to us in a deplorable state".

== Notable examples ==
=== Birds of America ===
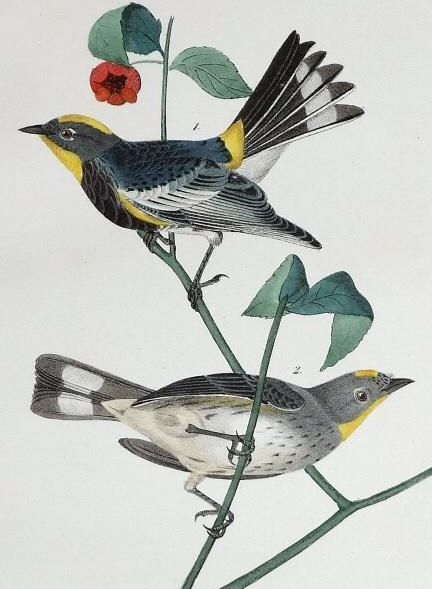
One of the plates painted by Audubon — Dendroica auduboni

The four-volume copy of Audubon's Birds of America held in the Royal Collection was rebound in 2011 by conservators at Windsor Castle. The volumes are especially large and heavy, being printed on double elephant paper of about 50 by 28 inches, and weighing over 50 pounds. The plates, which were published loose, had been originally bound by the royal bookbinder, James Mackenzie, around 1840. That leather cover had perished and the tight sewing of the pages made viewing difficult as the pages might tear. The rebinding was done in nine stages:

1. the volumes were taken apart by cutting away the spine, cords, and stitching, and removing the glue
2. the plates were separated, cleaned, repaired and pressed flat
3. paper guards were added to the spinal edge of the plates—strips of paper which would bear the new sewing
4. the plates were grouped into sections of four which were then sewn to linen tapes
5. the spines of the plates assembled for a volume were then rounded by beating with a hammer
6. new headbands of linen-covered vellum were added
7. new covers were made in the original style—boards covered with book cloth and leather reinforcement on the spine and corners
8. the original pastedowns and endpapers of marbled paper were restored for the inside of the cover
9. the leather of the cover was then tooled with hot brass and gold leaf to restore the titles and decoration in the style of the original binding

== See also ==
- Conservation and restoration of books, manuscripts, documents and ephemera
- Bookbinding
- Book restoration
- Library binding, may be a rebinding, though also original binding
