= Book restoration =

Repair and renovation

Book restoration is the renewal and repair of books. Techniques include cleaning; mending and filling damaged pages; restitching and rebinding. The first substantial work on the subject was Alfred Bonnardot's Essai sur l'art de Restaurer les Estampes et les Livres which was first published in Paris in 1846. Further significant developments occurred as a result of specific events including the 1904 fire at the Turin National University Library and the 1966 flood of the Arno which damaged over a million items in the National Central Library in Florence.

== Education and training ==
In France, conservators specialized in graphic arts and books are trained at the Institut National du Patrimoine (The National Institute of Cultural Heritage). Their mission is to intervene when heritage resources are threatened or deteriorated for several reasons. The conservator prevents works of art from disappearing or losing its purpose whilst analyzing the complex stage of its material history and the cause of alteration.

== Gallery ==
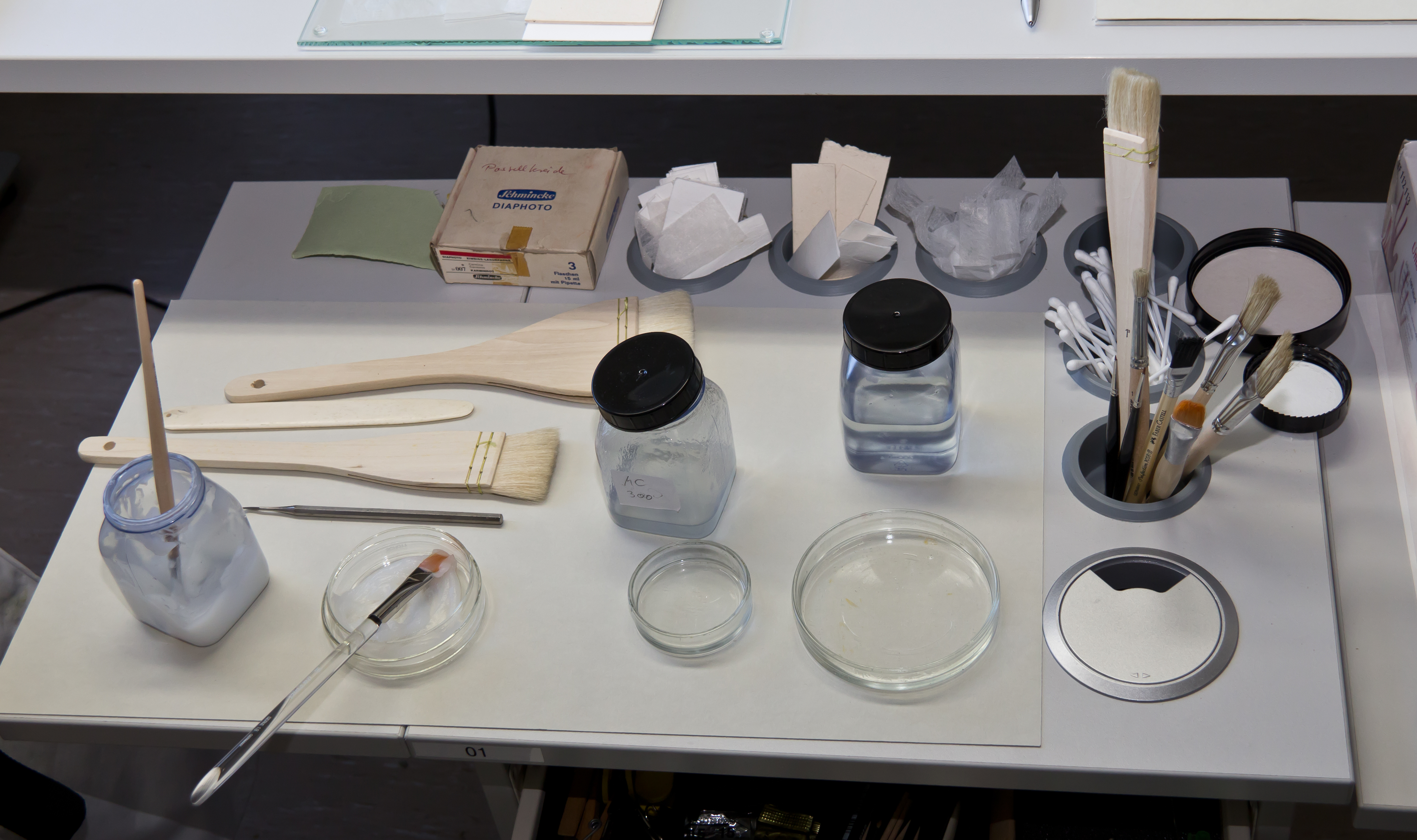

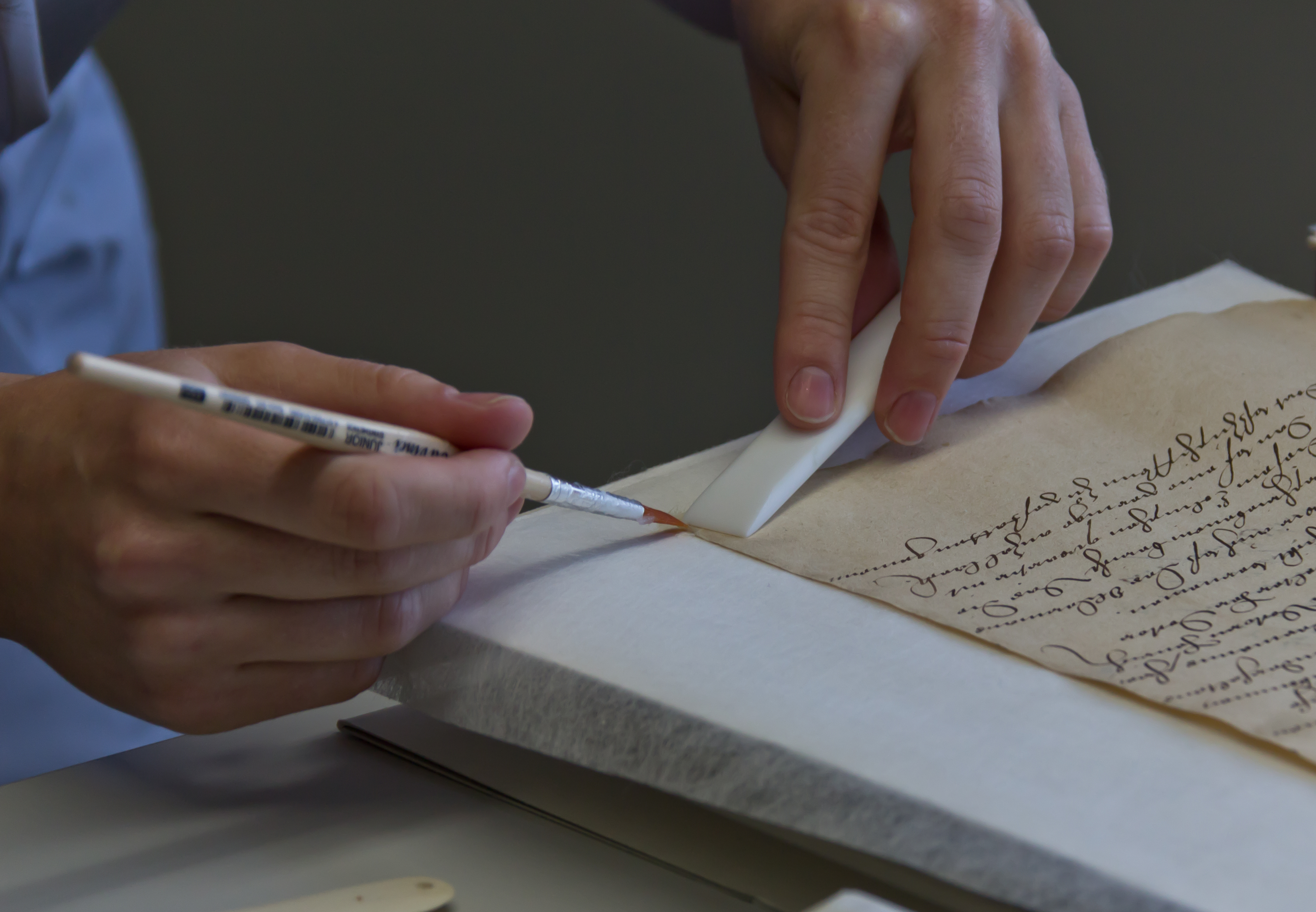

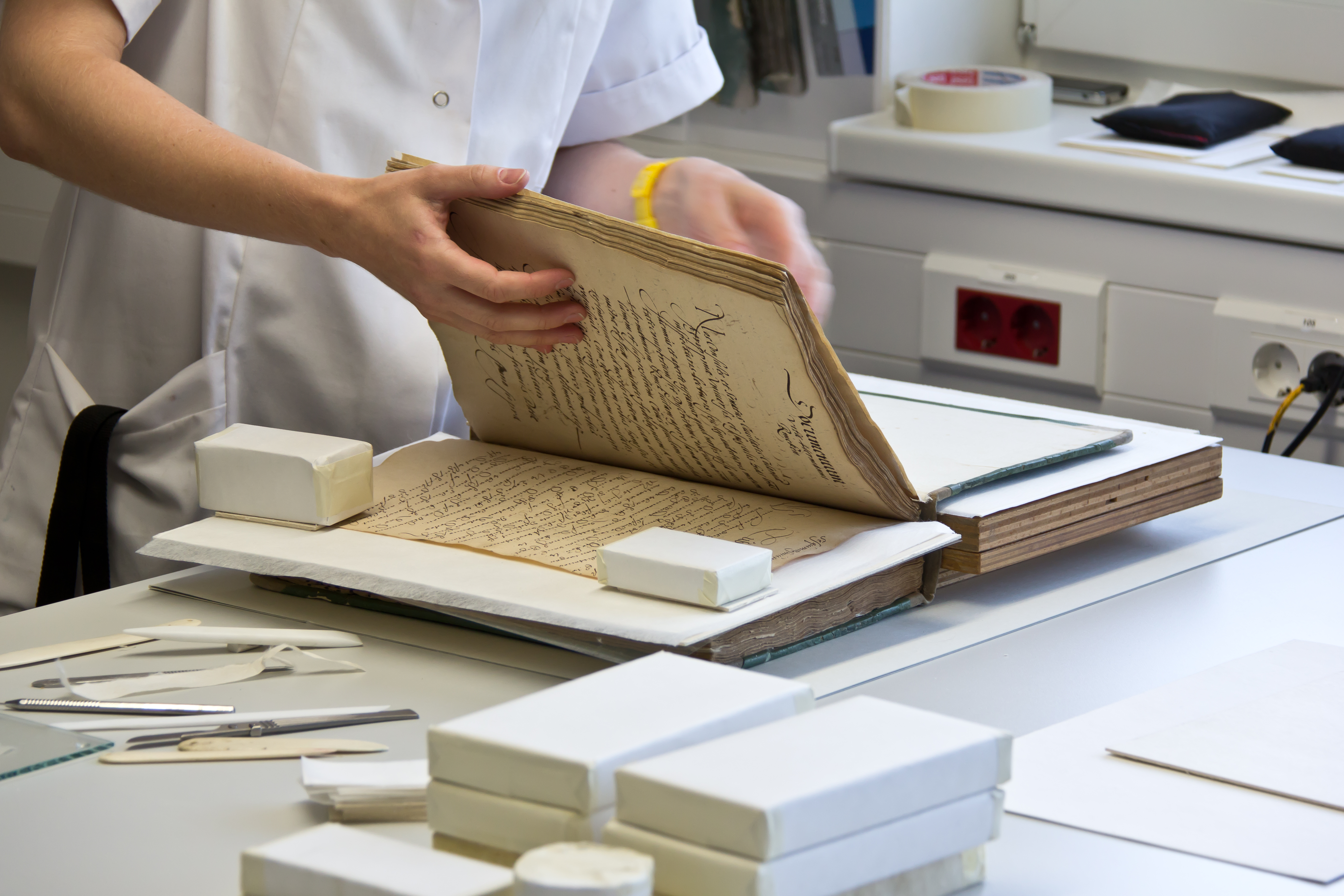

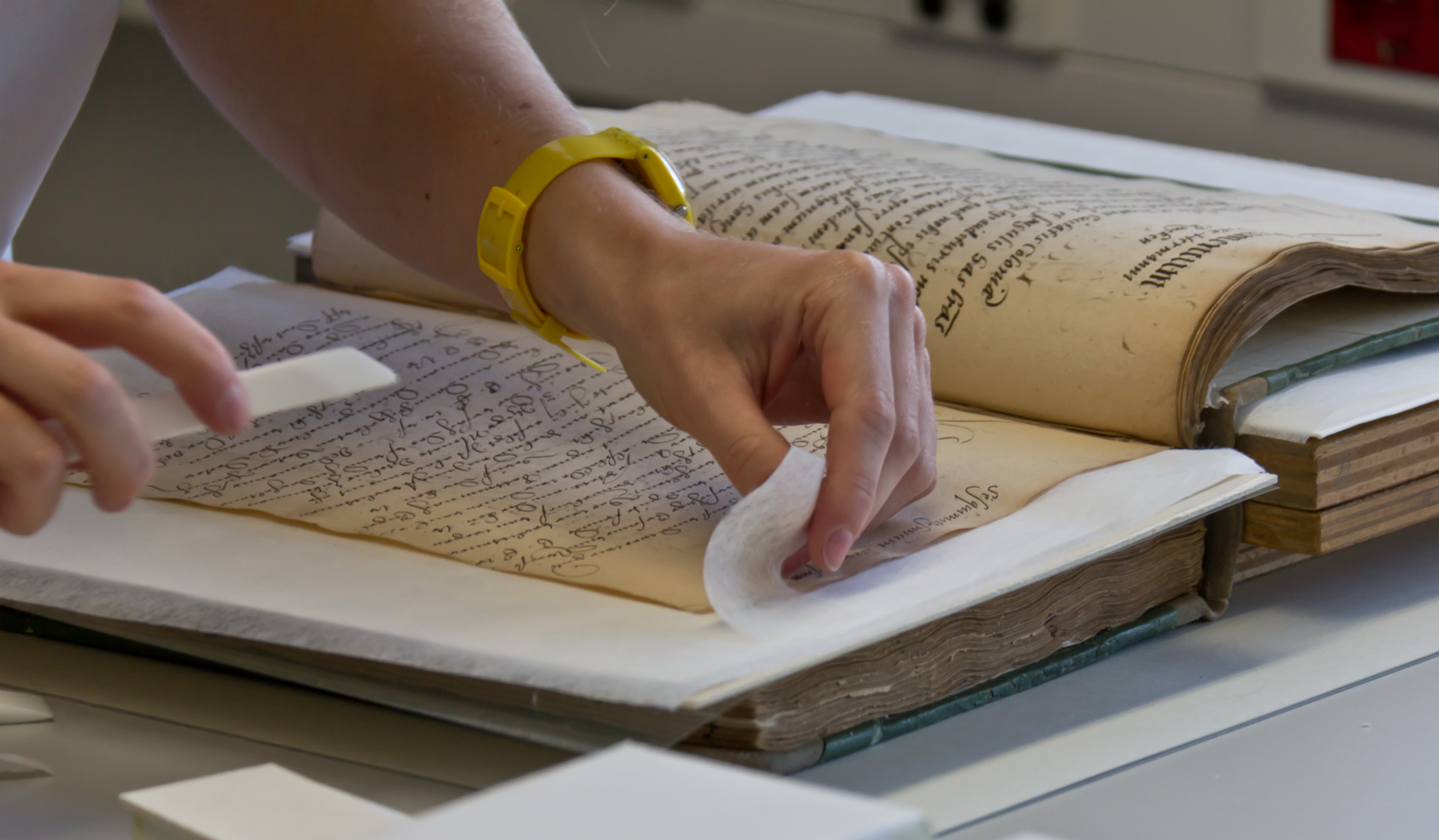
