= Conservation and restoration of textiles =

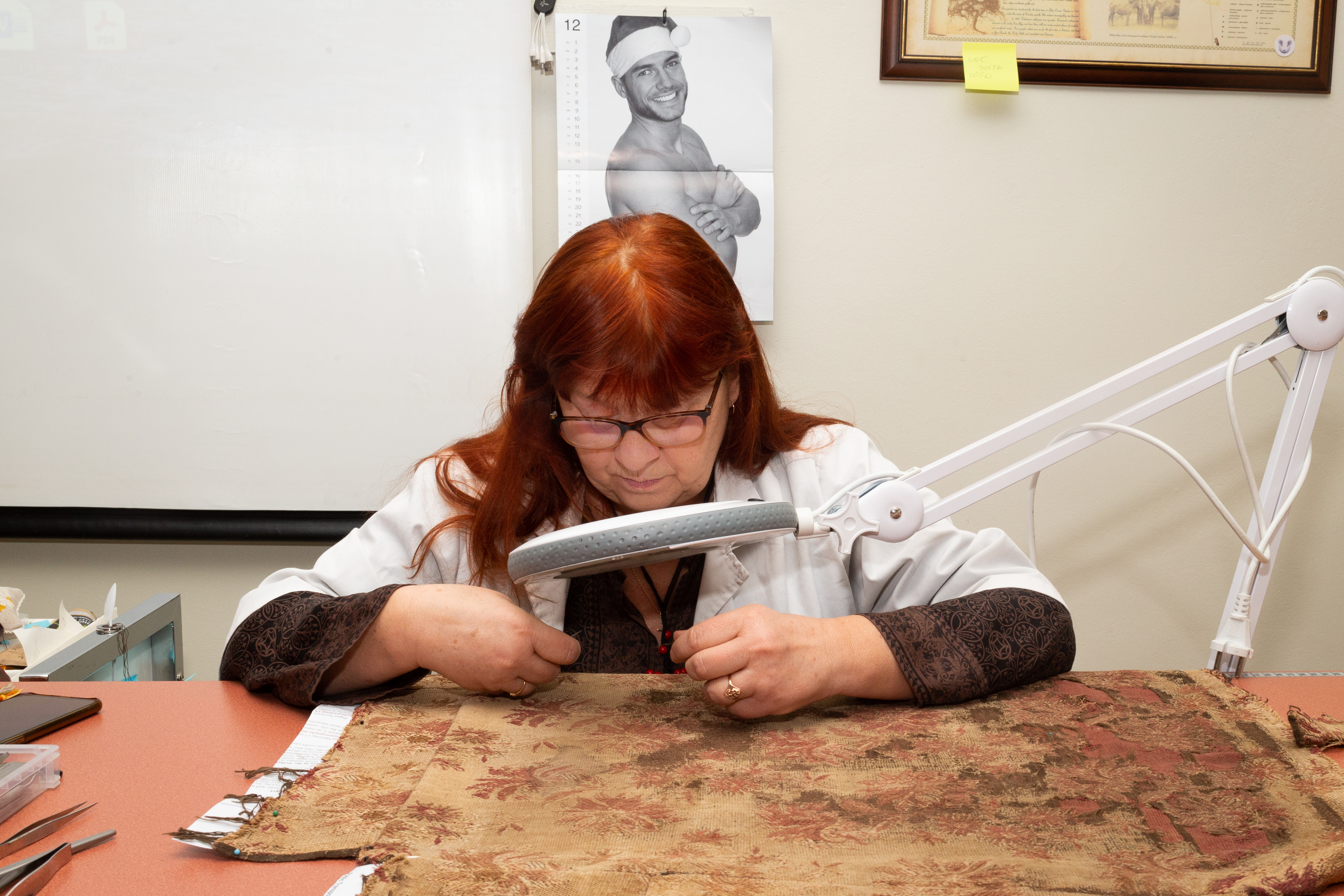
Textile conservation

The conservation and restoration of textiles refers to the processes by which textiles are cared for and maintained to be preserved from future damage. The field falls under the category of art conservation, heritage conservation as well as library preservation, depending on the type of collection. The concept of textile preservation applies to a wide range of artifacts, including tapestries, carpets, quilts, clothing, flags and curtains, as well as objects which "contain" textiles, such as upholstered furniture, dolls, and accessories such as fans, parasols, gloves and hats or bonnets. Many of these artifacts require specialized care, often by a professional conservator.

== Collections ==
Historic textile collections fall into three general categories: museums, historic societies/locations, and private collections. The needs of each of these locations will vary. A private collection, for instance, is unlikely to have as high a traffic flow as a museum, and may thus be able to take preservation steps that a public museum cannot, such as minimizing light exposure over long periods of time. Venue-specific issues may also arise. For instance, many historic homes do not have climate control and rely on natural light to display their furnishings, both factors that may contribute to textile decay.

== Environment ==
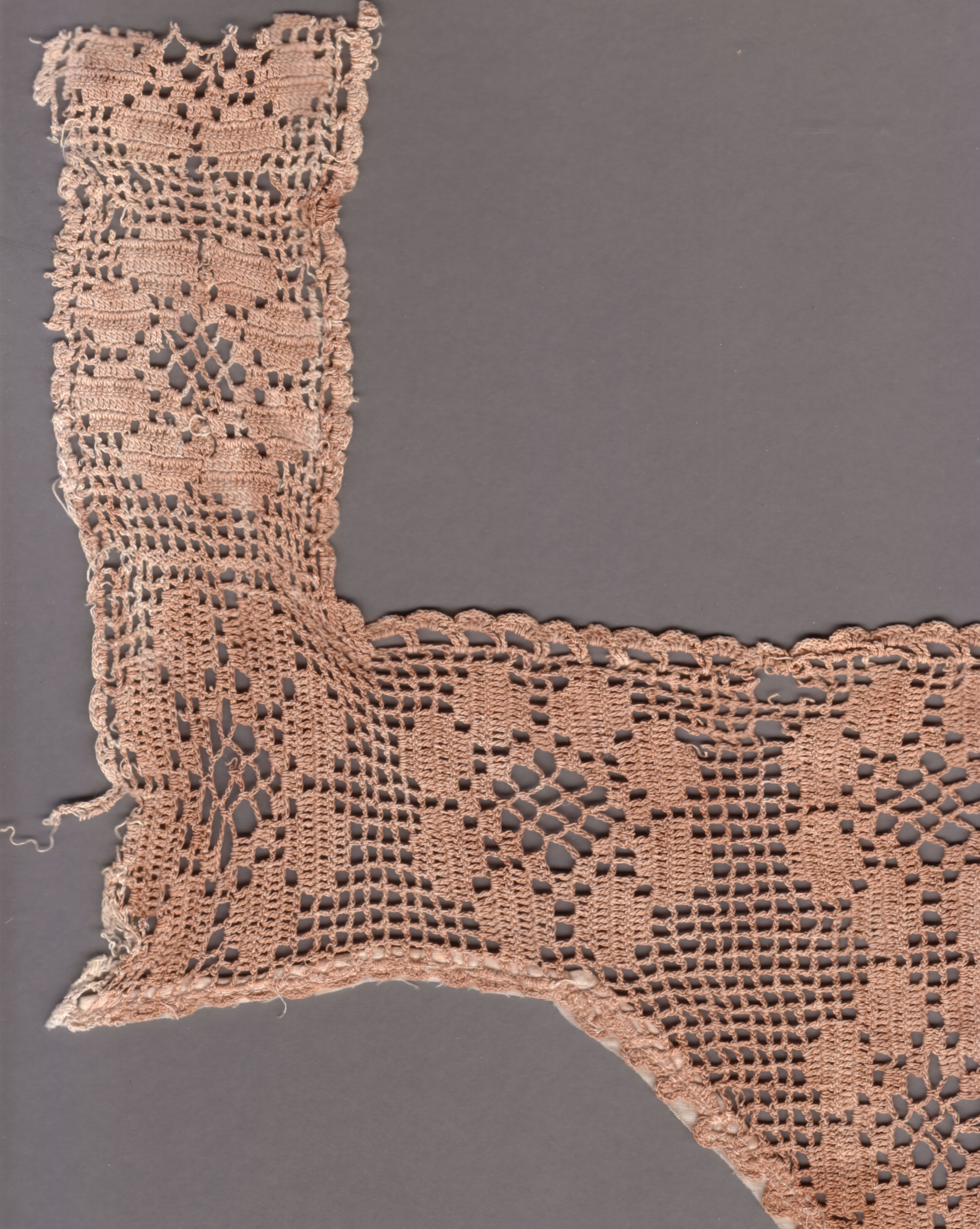
Deterioration and discoloration due to poor storage on a crocheted linen collar of the 1920s or 1930s

The chief cause for decay in textiles is almost always the environment in which they are stored. Light, temperature, and humidity can all contribute to a textile's health or deterioration, depending on their intensity. Additionally, pests, chemicals, and pollutants may also cause damage to an antique fabric. Airborne chemicals, such as smog or cigarette smoke are also harmful to the textiles, and should be avoided if at all possible. In museum or otherwise specialist collections, high-efficiency air filters are typically installed throughout the building to reduce the presence of airborne chemicals that may stain, discolor, or weaken fabrics.

=== Light ===
Light damage to silk textile

Light can have a variety of effects on textiles over time. In some cases, it may contribute to fading or discoloration, but the primary damage caused to textiles by light is fiber weakness caused by prolonged exposure to ultraviolet and infrared lighting. Ideally, textiles should be stored or displayed in as little light as possible, and preferably in total darkness. However, as this is impractical for display and care of the piece, knowledge of UV exposure limits and how a textile can be handled under safe amounts of lighting are also necessary for conservation.

Natural light is the most common source of ultraviolet light, and as such, care should be taken to avoid exposure to direct sunlight at all costs, and indirect sunlight whenever possible. This may mean storing or displaying textiles in an area without windows, or with blackout curtains, which can be drawn whenever the room is not in use. If a room relies on natural light, UV screens or coatings can be applied to the windows to block harmful rays while still allowing light to pass through. These filters should be checked periodically, however, as they have a limited lifespan and may need to be replaced every few years.

Fluorescent and halogen-produced light can also produce large amounts of UV radiation, though filters which fit over the bulbs are available to limit the damaging light. These filters are typically replaced when the bulbs are changed.

One advantage of fluorescent lights is that they produce little heat, which may also be harmful to textiles. Incandescent lights produce a large amount of heat in addition to large quantities of infrared radiation, which is likewise damaging to the fibers in antique textiles. If incandescent lights must be used, they should be placed far enough away from display cases that their heat does not affect the contents.

In the case of particularly delicate textiles, display organizers might consider motion-activated or timed lighting, or lighting controlled though a visitor-activated switch, which would allow the textiles to remain in darkness when not under view. All textiles should be displayed on a rotating schedule, allowing them a few months of display, then the rest of the year in dark storage, to prolong their life.

=== Climate ===
Heat and humidity can both contribute and a textile's deterioration. However, excessive dryness may also cause damage, especially to elastic fibers, such as wool, which rely on some amount of moisture to maintain their flexibility (Putnam and Finch). Additionally, temperature and humidity should be kept as constant as possible; changes in either of these may cause the textile fibers to expand and contract, which, over time, can also cause damage and deterioration to the textile. For this reason, both storage and display areas should be fitted with monitoring equipment to gauge the temperature and humidity of rooms, display cases, enclosed storage facilities, and work areas.

Bleeding of color

Mold damage

Ideally, temperature should be kept around 70 °F (21 °C), though some slight fluctuation in either direction is permissible, as long as it occurs gradually. For instance, temperature may be slightly lower in winter to save energy costs, but the change should be effected slowly, so as not to place the fibers under undue stress.

As for humidity, the preservationist or conservator should aim for a relative humidity of 50%, though, as with temperature, some small fluctuation is allowable, as long as it occurs gradually. In enclosed display or storage cases, humidity can be somewhat maintained through the use of silica gel crystals. These crystals should not be placed in contact with the textiles, but may be placed in breathable muslin bags and hung inside the case to maintain a constant humidity; they should be monitored periodically, however, to be sure that they are working.

In areas where climate control is unavailable (such as in historic buildings), the conservator can still moderate the temperature and relative humidity through use of fans, humidifiers and dehumidifiers, and portable heating or cooling units.

In addition to temperature and humidity, airflow is also a concern for textile preservation. Textiles should never be sealed in plastic or other air-tight casing unless it is part of a treatment or cleaning process. Proper circulation, combined with the suggested humidity, will help to prevent the growth of mold and mildew, which may stain or weaken antique textiles.

=== Pests ===
Pests are another significant threat to textile collections, as there are a number of creatures that can cause damage to fibres. Among the most common are clothes moths, carpet beetles, silverfish, firebrats and rodents.

Clothes moths are attracted to protein fibres, and so are especially drawn to silk, wool, and feathers. An infestation might be identified through the evidence of white cocoons (or the remnants thereof) on the textiles, or of sighting the insects themselves. They are roughly 8 cm (3.1 in) long and white in colour.

Like clothes moths, carpet beetles are likewise drawn to proteins and can be quite destructive. Evidence of an infestation may take the form of chewed holes, carcasses, or larvae, which appear as small pale worm-like insects.

Silverfish and firebrats are related insects that consume starch, usually found in sizing or other treatments applied to fabrics, as well as plant-based textiles such as linen and cotton. Both are attracted to dark, moist climates, though silverfish prefer cooler temperatures, while firebrats tend towards warmer. Both are about 12 mm (0.47 in) in length and either light or dark in colouring, depending on which type is present.

Rodent infestations can be identified in the usual ways, such as seeing droppings, nests, or comparatively large chewed areas of textile where they have caused damage.

In all cases, chemical means of pest control should be avoided if possible, not only due to harm to humans who come in contact with them but because the chemicals may cause damage to the very textiles the conservator is trying to save. For rodents, snap traps may be effective, and if needed, a professional exterminator should be called. Poison baited traps should be avoided, as the rodent could die somewhere inaccessible, and provide a breeding ground for further pests. In the case of a rodent infestation, all access points to the room (such as cracks or holes) through which they might be entering should also be located and sealed if possible.

For insects, keeping clean storage, display, and work environment is the best method of prevention. Sticky traps (replaced often) around doors, windows, and display cases may be useful for monitoring the insect population. Furthermore, the population of carnivorous insects, such as spiders, should be observed. While such insects are not harmful to textiles by themselves, they may indicate another population of insects which are.

If the infestation can be limited to one or a few pieces, the insects may be killed through freezing of the object. The textile should be wrapped in plastic and vacuum-sealed, then brought to a freezing temperature as quickly as possible, to prevent the insects from adjusting to the cold. The object may be left frozen for several days but should be brought slowly back up to room temperature to avoid further damage. While this method should kill adults, it may not destroy any eggs that are present.

If chemical means must be employed, it would be best to consult with a professional conservator to be certain that the treatment will not harm the textiles themselves.

Even if no signs of an infestation are present, textiles should still be inspected periodically to be certain that there is no outbreak that has gone unobserved. Additionally, when dealing with a new acquisition that shows signs of insect damage, the specimen should be quarantined until it can be determined whether the insects are still present before introducing it to the rest of the collection.

== Textile instability ==
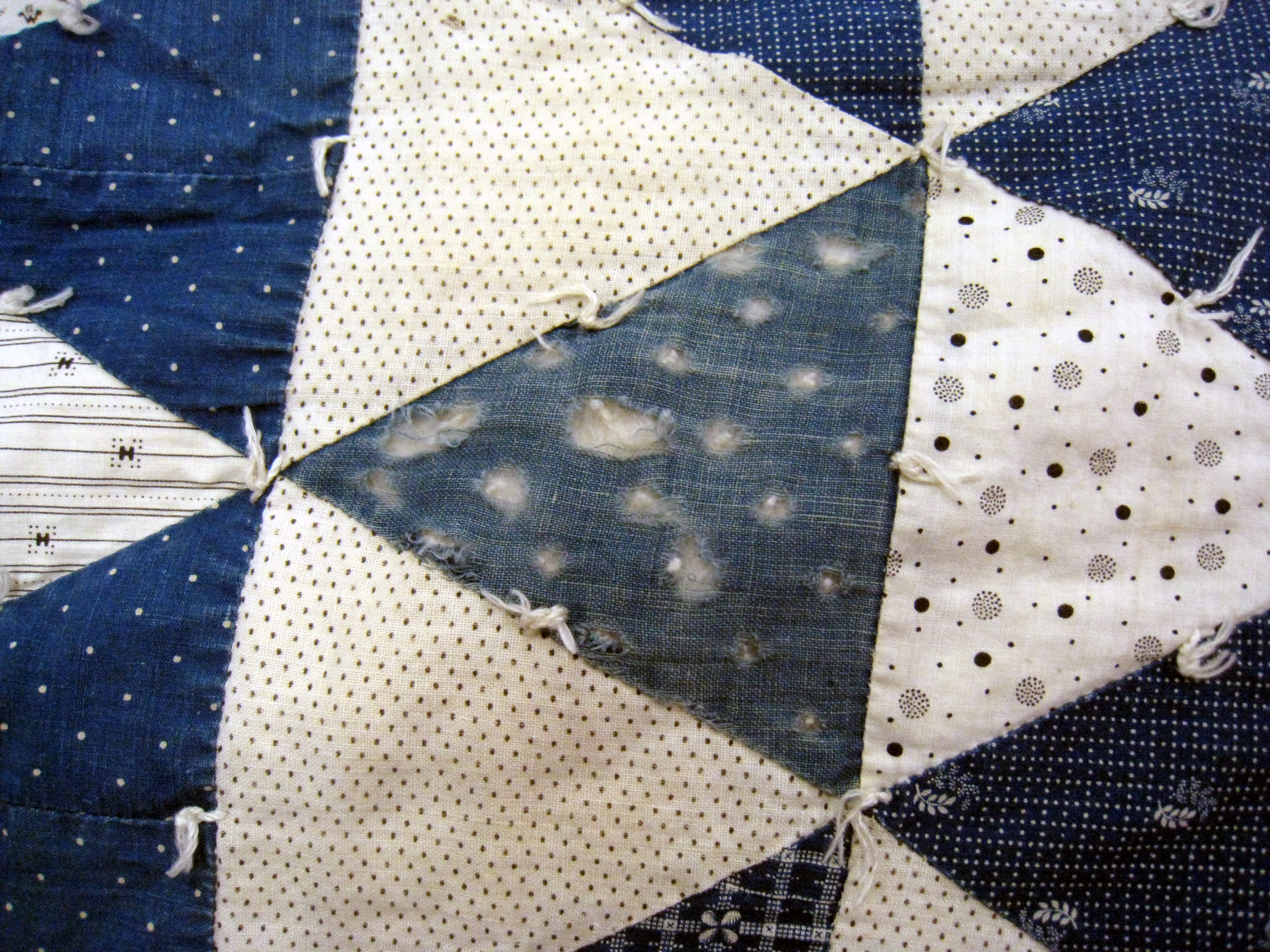
Dye rot

In some cases, the textiles are weakened not by outside causes such as light or pests, but by chemical reactions taking place within the fabric itself, such as the oxidation of iron-based mordants over time, which can cause darkening and discolouration in the surrounding fibres.

One example which is cited frequently throughout the literature is the case of shattered silk. During the late 19th and early 20th centuries, many silk manufacturers treated their fabrics with metallic salts (usually containing tin and iron) to improve their drape and feel; as silk was priced by weight, this process also replaced some of the considerable (one-fifth) weight lost through the removal of sericin from silk fibres in the degumming process; the resulting fabric was known as weighted silk. However, as the fabrics age, the metals in the fibres accelerate their decay and cause them to become extremely brittle, an effect sped up in part by the addition of 10–15% weight in metallic salt added to some fabrics by manufacturers. This has the effect of shredding, or "shattering", the silk fibre, with the environment and conservation of the textile contributing very little to prevent this deterioration, though exposure to light may accelerate it even further.

Textile preservationists should be familiar with their collections and the history and provenance of their pieces. Chemical tests can reveal the types of dyes and mordants used, as well as any other treatments applied to the fabric. Such knowledge can lead to the prevention of further decay by learning which pieces need to be handled with particular care.

== Handling ==
Fragile and/or valuable textiles should be handled with care, and as little as necessary in any given circumstance. However, should handling be necessary, there are precautions which can be taken to ensure the safety of the textile.

Because human hands contain oils and acids in the skin, clean cloth gloves should be worn when handling textiles. If gloves are unavailable, then frequent hand-washing should be undertaken to ensure that no damage is caused. For similar reasons, the working, display, and storage areas should be free of food, drink, and cigarette smoke, which can also stain or damage the fabric. Finally, to avoid ink stains, only pencils should be used for writing or sketching in the work space.

To avoid snags and pulls, remove any jewelry that may catch in the fabric's weave, and wear clothing free of large buckles or other objects which may snag the textile. Long hair should also be tied back to allow a clear view of the working area, even when the head is bent over the table.

When working with the textiles, they should be placed on a clean, flat surface which is larger than the textile itself, so that the whole piece is supported evenly. Although it is supported, never place anything on top of the textile while it is in the flat position.

When moving the textile, it is important to maintain the flat, even support of the work space. If the piece is small enough (a handkerchief or sampler, for instance), it may be placed on an acid-free board or similar support and carried as if on a tray. If the piece is too large for this (a carpet or tapestry, for example), the piece may be rolled around an acid-free tube and carried by two people to its new location.

Finally, antique costumes and clothing should never be worn, as the mere process of putting the clothes on and taking them off will cause damage. Additionally, the model may not fit the costume precisely – clothing was for a long time made to fit a specific person, not mass-produced in approximate sizes – causing strain where there should be none and slack where there likewise should be none.

== Cleaning ==
=== Vacuuming ===
One of the safest and easiest ways to clean textiles is to vacuum them. The fabric is placed on a clean, flat work surface. If the specimen is particularly delicate, or simply as a precaution, a fibreglass screen edged with twill tape may be placed over the textile. The screen allows dirt and dust to pass through, but prevents individual threads from being pulled loose or unravelled further by the suction. Using a vacuum attachment and the lowest power setting, move the suction over the screen until the entire area has been cleaned. If needed, move the screen to a new area and begin again. Both sides of the textile are vacuumed, as dirt may filter through to the other side. Hanging textiles will need to be vacuumed less often than horizontal pieces, as there are fewer places where dust can collect.

=== Wet cleaning ===
One of the key standards of preservation is that of reversibility: anything done to preserve a piece should be able to be undone with minimal damage to the piece itself. Because wet cleaning is a chemical process, it is not reversible, and so should be used only when absolutely necessary.

Before cleaning a textile, certain questions should be asked to determine both the best treatment for that particular combination of textile and soil, and to ascertain whether the piece is able to be cleaned, or may sustain damage during the process:

- Chemical composition of the textile – a textile may have a high acid content, or may have had chemicals used in its production that could contribute to its reactions to water or other cleaning chemicals.
- Characteristics of the fibres – different fibre types have different properties, affecting their care and conservation; for instance, cotton and linen, both fibre crops, are stronger when wet than when dry, and may be able to withstand more mechanical stress when cleaning than something like silk. Wool can absorb large amounts of water, but mats if washed in high temperatures. All silks become brittle with age, but weighted silks decay more quickly, and thus must be handled with extreme care. Additionally, some silks, once wet, can be permanently spotted, creating water stains that are difficult to remove.
- Colourants of the textile – a textile's colourants includes dyes, but also the mordants used to set dyes, with different mordanting processes used throughout the world, making knowledge of a textile's origins and the chemistry of its dye necessary. A drop of water may be applied to an inconspicuous area of the textile and blotted with a clean white cloth to ascertain the colourfastness and washability of the dye; dye that transfers with the application of water show a textile that should not be washed.
- Finishes or surface treatments – a textile may have been painted, meaning that it cannot be washed, or may have had foil applied to its surface that has since worn away.
- Soiling and stains – a textile may be stained in a variety of ways, with older stains more difficult to remove. Stains and soiling may be left in place, or removed only partially, if the conservator decides that it is necessary in order to preserve the rest of the piece. Additionally, a textile may be soiled in ways undetectable to the naked eye; textile flags, for instance, may be highly acidic due to long exposure to air pollution.
- Safest and most effective cleaners – choice of cleaning agent can be critical to the conservation of a textile, with commercial detergents not recommended for use on antique textiles, no matter how delicate or gentle they may be, as the chemicals used in most clothes detergents are too harsh for old fibres to withstand. A wide range of speciality detergents are available from conservation suppliers, though most sources suggest Ivory dish soap as a last-minute substitution if needed. Chemical spot cleaners are likewise not recommended, as they are too harsh for old fibres to tolerate. Choice of cleaning agent can be particularly important for pieces in situ, as they may endanger other nearby pieces as well (the wooden part of an upholstered piece of furniture, for instance).
- Cleaning additives and aids – cleaning additives, such as water softeners and cleaning agents, as well as physical supplies such as water, screens and a vacuum cleaner, may be necessary.
- Length of cleaning exposure – a textile may only be able to withstand exposure to a cleaning agent for a certain period of time, with prolonged exposure potentially causing additional damage to the fibres.
- Choice of mechanical cleaning action – older and more fragile textiles may not be able to tolerate much movement during the cleaning process, and the mechanics of cleaning should be considered before undertaking a cleaning.

Once the best cleaning process has been determined, the piece should be prepared for washing. Usually, this involves vacuuming to remove any surface dirt. Linings and backings should also be removed, vacuumed, and washed separately. This is not only to prevent colour bleeding, but to avoid trapping dirt between the layers, which may cause discolouration from the inside. Additionally, different fibres react to cleaning in different ways, and fabrics may shrink or stretch, which, if they are still attached together, may cause rippling and distortion in the lining and outer layer of the textile.

As with moving or working with dry pieces, the textile should be washed in a flat, fully supported position. Usually this is achieved through the use of screens like the ones used in vacuuming, though these may be supported in a frame of some kind for added stability. The textile should be sandwiched between two screens. If the piece is particularly delicate or fragile, it may be wrapped in netting, then placed between the screens.

The cleaning solution should be prepared using distilled water. If unavailable, softened water may be substituted. The main concern is to avoid hard water, which will leave deposits of minerals in the fibres. The solution should be placed in a container large enough for the textile to lie flat in. For large pieces, it may be necessary to construct a temporary basin outside or in a large room: Putnam and Finch suggest using boards or bricks to construct a frame, then lining it with a large piece of plastic, weighted on the sides, and strong enough to support the water that will be poured into it. If a smaller basin is used, it should be of ceramic, stainless steel or a stable plastic.

The screen-encased textile is lowered into the solution. The textile can then be washed by pressing a soft sponge directly down onto the fibres. The sponge should not be rubbed, as this will cause unnecessary abrasion at a moment when the textile is already weak from the water. The textile may be submerged for no more than an hour, and should be rinsed at least four times after it is cleaned. The final rinse should always be with distilled water. The textile should be placed to dry on a flat surface or screen, in a well-ventilated room away from heat.

=== Dry cleaning ===
Artifact sent to the dry cleaners ended up with substantial physical damage

Dry cleaning is generally only used for oil stains, as it is a very stressful process of the textile. Commercial dry cleaners should never be used, as the chemicals used in the process are too strong for old fabrics to withstand without damage. If dry cleaning is absolutely necessary, consult a professional conservator.

=== Steaming and ironing ===
Steaming and ironing textiles should be done with caution, as the heat may affect the viability of the fibres. More importantly, the fabric should always be cleaned before either of these processes is used, since heat may trap dirt and stains in the fibres to such an extent that the stain becomes permanent. Always use the lowest setting for either of these procedures. If a garment relies on folds to maintain its proper shape (such as pleats), it may be better to finger-press the folds into place when the garment is damp and allow it to dry that way, rather than subject it to the added stress of ironing.

=== Alternative to ironing ===
If a textile item is relatively thin and light, and is safe to wet, it can be laid out flat on a piece of glass which is larger than the item. Before each use, the glass surface should be cleaned with 'safe' cleaners, as for the textile itself, even if the glass has been kept in a clean place. The last rinse of the glass should ideally be with a very clean cotton cloth and distilled water.

The preservationist lays the textile out as flat as possible on the dry glass. The textile must not touch any metal or other casing that protects the edge of the glass. Old storm-windowpanes and glass shower doors are often used for this task, and they usually have their original edging left on, if it is not too bulky, for reasons of safety in handling. If the textile is known to be clean, it can be laid out dry and gently wetted to full saturation. As sections are wetted, any crumples, folds, or details (such as fringes, the picots on the edges of lace, or fine pleats) can be gently teased into place with clean fingertips so that they lie as flat as possible on the glass.

Some old textiles can be flattened on glass just after washing, though it may be best to transfer to the glass fully supported, as on a netting screen or similar. The supporting fabric can be removed by rolling it out from under the textile item as it is laid out on the glass, bit by bit. This can stress the fibres: this method cannot be used on any old textile that is likely to be damaged by the handling. Such fabrics are allowed to dry first, then lay them on the glass and wet them in place.

Drying takes place in a darkened place with good air-flow. The textile can be gently lifted from the glass when it is completely dry, and will usually look just as smooth as if a hot iron had been used on it.

== Restoration ==
Restoration can be done with techniques like mending and darning.

== Storage ==
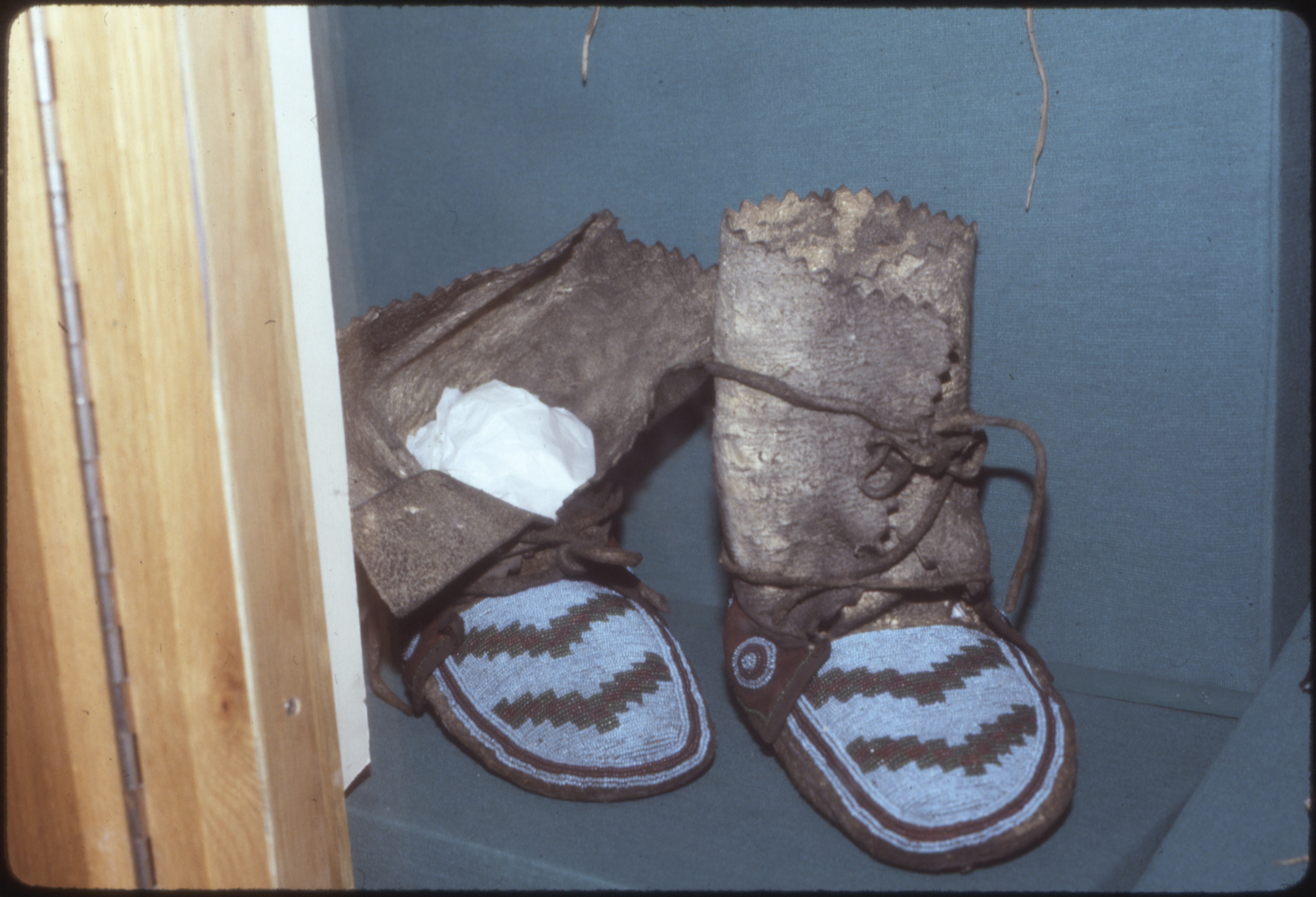
Poor support of boots artifact

The best storage environment for textiles is clean, dark, cool, and moderately dry, with a constant temperature and relative humidity. Ideally, there should be no strain on any one particular area of cloth. There are three basic kinds of storage for textiles, and the choice of which to use relies on the type of textile and the space available. The three types are flat, rolled, and hanging storage.

=== Flat storage ===
Flat storage is the best option for exceptionally fragile pieces because it provides the most even support for the fibres. Enamelled metal shelves or drawers may be used, or acid-free boxes. The textiles may be placed in the boxes or drawers flat, if at all possible. If folding becomes necessary, acid-free tissue paper should be used to form soft rolls around which the folds can be shaped, to prevent creases from forming. Even so, folded textiles should be removed and refolded differently every few months, to allow even wear on the piece.

=== Rolled storage ===
Rolled textile storage

For exceptionally large textiles, such as tapestries, draperies, carpets and quilts, rolled storage is the best option. Like the upholstery section of a fabric store, the rolled storage area should consist of racks, each containing horizontally suspended acid-free or fabric-covered tubes around which the fabrics can be wrapped, being sure to line the selvages up with the edges of the roll. Textiles with a decorative side (such as velvets and embroidered textiles) should always be rolled with the decorative side facing out. This is because the inner layer, especially if there is a lining, may crease, stretch, or fold while it is on the roll. The rolled textiles can then be covered with a muslin wrapper to protect it from dust.

=== Hanging costume storage ===
Damage to textile from wide polystyrene clothes hanger

For costumes, flat storage may create more problems than it solves, since it is impossible to store them in this manner without forming folds and creases. Therefore, unless the costume is so weakened that it cannot support its own weight, hanging storage is perhaps the best option. Costumes which are unusually heavy (heavily beaded gowns, for instance), or those whose fabric may distort easily (such as some stretch fabrics, or those cut on the bias) should also be stored in flat storage. Garments suitable for hanging should be placed on plastic hangers which have been padded to mimic the shape of human shoulders, and covered with a plastic or cloth cover with an open bottom to allow air circulation while keeping the costume clean. Wooden hangers may have a high acid content, which may cause discolouration or decay to the costume. Likewise, metal hangers do not provide sufficient support, and may lead to distortion of the garments' shoulders. Therefore, both forms of hanging should be avoided.

If sufficient space is available, selected garments may be stored on dummies to better keep their shape. If this method is used, dummies should be fitted out with the proper undergarments, such as bustles or panniers, to provide adequate support for the garments as they were intended to be worn. However, while the main concern of a display may be to make the garment look attractive on the dummy, storage need have no such considerations. Loose, unsupported parts of the garment (such as sleeves or shirts) should be loosely stuffed with acid-free tissue paper to provide additional support.

Costume accessories can be stored in a variety of ways. Generally, bonnets and gloves should be loosely stuffed with acid-free tissue and placed in archival-quality boxes or under cover. Fans and parasols may be stored in half-open positions, which provide the least amount of stress on the fabrics.

== Display ==
The preferable conditions required for display of textiles are dry, cool, and dark surroundings, with a clean environment and frequent checks to be certain that the textiles are remaining in good condition necessary. Lighting should be kept to a minimum, and textiles should be rotated through display, so that each is only exposed to light for a few months at a time before being returned to darkness or taken for cleaning/conservation work. Textiles should be vacuumed before and after display.

== Education and training ==
In France, conservators specialized in textiles arts are trained at the Institut National du Patrimoine (The National Institute of Cultural Heritage). Their mission is to intervene when heritage resources are threatened or deteriorated for several reasons. The conservator prevents works of art from disappearing or loses its purpose whilst analyzing the complex stage of its material history and the cause of alteration.

== Works cited ==
- Fahey, Mary (2007). "The Care and Preservation of Antique Textiles and Costumes." Henry Ford Museum.
- Finch, Karen, and Greta Putnam (1977). Caring for Textiles. London: Barrie & Jenkins.
- Mailand, Harold F (1978). Considerations for the Care of Textiles and Costumes: A Handbook for the Non-Specialist. Indianapolis, IN: Indianapolis Museum of Art.
- Mailand, Harold F. and Dorothy Stiles Alig (1999). Preserving Textiles: A Guide for the Non- Specialist. Inaianapolis, IN: Indianapolis Museum of Art.
- Rice, James W. (1972). "Principals of Fragile Textile Cleaning." Textile Conservation. Jentina E. Leene, ed. New York: Smithsonian Institution. 32–72.
- Schweppe, Helmut (1984). "Identification of Dyes in Historic Textile Materials." Historic Textile and Paper Materials: Conservation and Characterization. Howard L. Needles and S. Haig Zeronian, ed. United States: American Chemical Society. 153–175.

== Textile conservation video files ==
- Materials You Need - (Part 1 of 6) Conservation and Preservation of Heirloom Textiles
- How to Make a Padded Hanger - (Part 2 of 6) Conservation and Preservation of Heirloom Textiles
- Storing Costumes in Boxes - (Part 3 of 6) Conservation and Preservation of Heirloom
- Storage of Flat Textiles in Boxes - (Part 4 of 6) Conservation and Preservation of Heirloom Textiles
- Storage of Quilts and Coverlets - (Part 5 of 6) Conservation and Preservation of Heirloom Textiles
- Rolling Textiles on a Tube - (Part 6 of 6) Conservation and Preservation of Heirloom Textiles
