= Gisela Hellenkemper Salies =

German classical archaeologist

- Born: 19 February 1944; Chorzów, Poland
- Died: 5 May 1999 (aged 55); Bonn, Germany
- Occupation: Classicist

Academic background
- Education: University of Cologne
- Thesis: Untersuchungen zu den geometrischen Gliederungsschemata römischer Mosaiken (1972)

Academic work
- Main interests: Classics; Ancient Greece

Gisela Hellenkemper Salies (19 February 1944 – 5 May 1999) was a German classical archaeologist and museum curator.

== Career ==
Salies took her first degree, in classics and classical archaeology, at the University of Cologne in 1963. From 1967 to 1969 she studied classical archaeology at the University of Athens under Spyridon Marinatos and took part in excavations at Kerameikos. In 1969, she returned to Cologne to undertake doctoral research under Heinz Kähler, submitting her thesis Untersuchungen zu den geometrischen Gliederungsschemata römischer Mosaiken in 1972.

Subsequently, she worked on the Corpus der minoischen und mykenischen Siegel ('Corpus of Minoan and Mycenaean seals') under the direction of Friedrich Matz, and co-edited volume II,2 with Nikolaos Platon and Ingo Pini. In 1976, she was appointed curator at the Rheinisches Landesmuseum Bonn where she remained for the rest of her career. She was the editor of the journal Bonner Jahrbücher.

In 1990, she was elected as a member of the German Archaeological Institute. In 1996, she was elected as an Honorary Fellow of the Society of Antiquaries of London.

== Personal life ==
Salies married Hansgerd Hellenkemper, Byzantinist and director of the Romano-Germanic Museum in Cologne, in 1979. She is commemorated on a monument in the Poppelsdorfer Friedhof (Poppelsdorfer Cemetery) in Bonn.

== Selected publications ==
- 1977. (with Nikolaos Platon and Ingo Pini) Iraklion, Archäologisches Museum. Teil 2. Die Siegel der Altpalastzeit. (Corpus der minoischen und mykenischen Siegel II.) Berlin: Gebrüder Mann.
- 1978. (with Brian Dobson and Carola Rüger) Die Primipilares: Entwicklung und Bedeutung, Laufbahnen und Persönlichkeiten eines römischen Offiziersranges Köln: Rheinland-Verlag.
- 1986. La création du monde. Les mosaïques de Saint-Marc à Venise. Paris.
- 1986. De mozaïeken van San Marco in Venetië: beeldverhaal van de schepping. Alphen aan den Rijn.
- 1994. (with Hans-Hoyer von Prittwitz und Gaffron and Gerhard Bauchhenss). Das Wrack: der antike Schiffsfund von Mahdia (Kataloge des Rheinischen Landesmuseums Bonn, Bd. 1). Köln: Rheinland Verlag
- 1994. (with Willer, F. ) "Kunst für Rom – in Bonn restauriert." Archäologie in Deutschland, (4), 12–15.
