= Institut national du patrimoine =

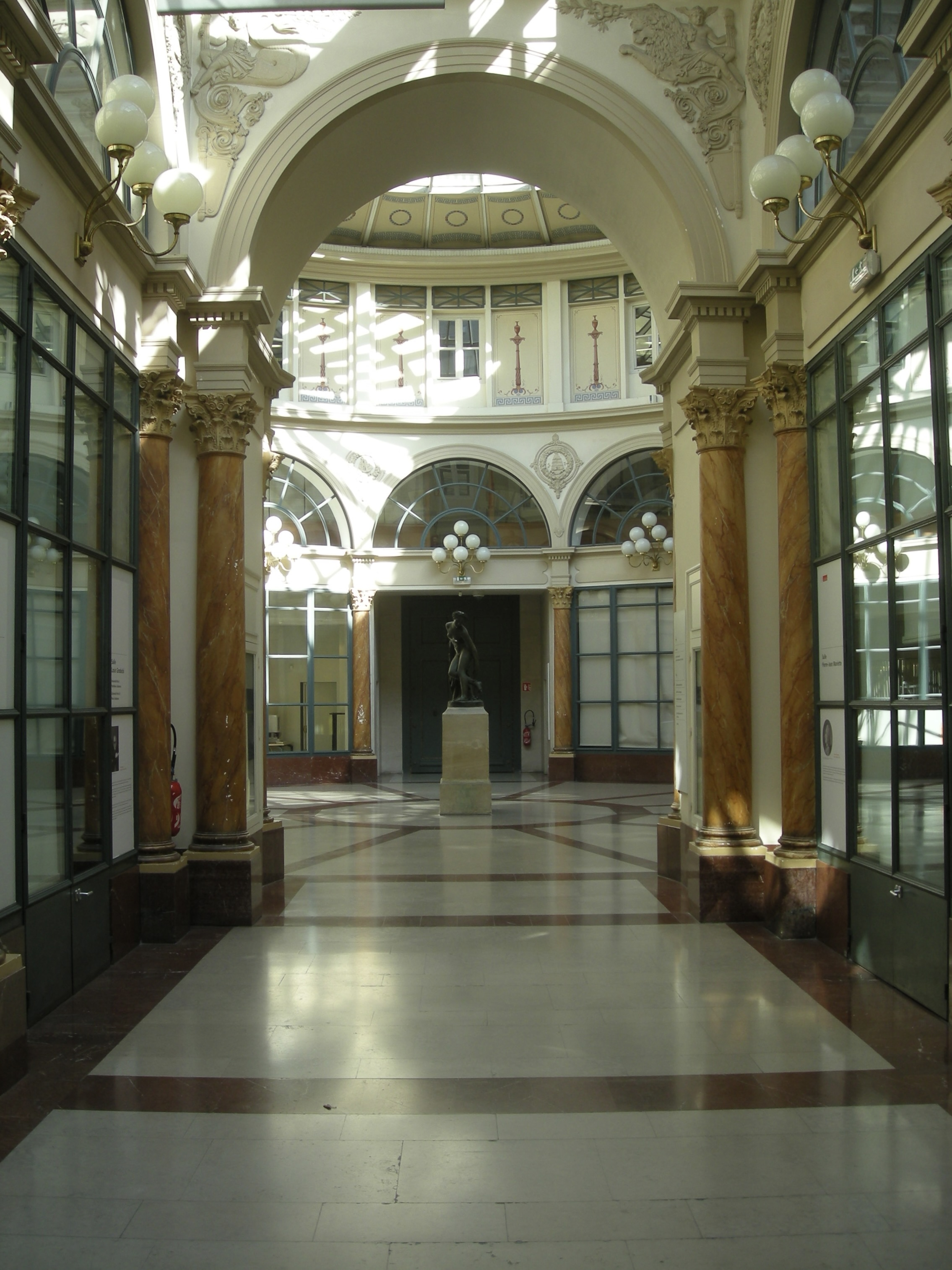
- The Galerie Colbert in Paris
- Type: Public
- Established: 2001
- Director: Charles Personnaz
- Location: France
- Website: www.inp.fr

The French National Institute of Cultural Heritage, Institut national du patrimoine (Inp), is the only academy in France in charge of the training of both curators and conservators. It belongs to French Ministry of Culture and is organized in 2 departments. Institut national du patrimoine is located in 2 historical sites : galerie Colbert, in the heart of Institut national d'histoire de l'art (INHA) for the department of curators and administrative headquarters, and Aubervilliers, for the department of conservators, re-using a former matchstick factory dating from the 19th century and totally renovated for the purposes of the initial and continuing training programmes.

== History ==
Institut national du patrimoine (Inp) is one of the most recent French leading schools ("grandes écoles") the name of which was given in 2001. The aim of this institution was to gather two previous public institutions : Institut français de restauration des oeuvres d'art (IFROA) established in 1977 and École nationale du patrimoine (ENP) created in 1990. Institut français de restauration des oeuvres d'art was used to train conservators and was attached to École nationale du patrimoine in 1996. The establishment of École nationale du patrimoine was linked to the creation of a new profile of French civil servants : the heritage curators, whose missions started from state level and developed to the City of Paris and local government level, thanks to an agreement with Centre national de la fonction publique territoriale (CNFPT). From the beginning, the ambition of the institution has been to ensure the excellence of professionals and to create bridges between two domains

Both departments have their own entrance examination, specialties and calendar for the different steps.

== Teaching ==
=== Department of curators ===
The mission of the department is to recruit candidates through competitive entrance examinations and provide initial training to heritage curators for State civil service, local government civil service authorities and City of Paris. The department is an application school ("école d'application") for the laureates, who generally devoted previous studies to academic research before entering the academy (university, École du Louvre, École nationale des chartes, École normale supérieure, ...). The status of the students is civil servant as soon as they begin the training. The training lasts 18 months and aims to prepare high rank civil servants and heads of departments, institutions or other, in charge of administration, management, scientific expertise, transmission and enhancement of heritage. The skills which are developed in the Institut national du patrimoine vary : administrative, financial, legal, technical, code of ethics, human resources...

The different specialties proposed after successful entry are : archaeology, archives, historical monuments and inventory, museology, scientific, technical and natural heritage.

The training is divided in theoretical courses (9 months) and internships in France and abroad (9 months). Internships are generally organized thanks to agreements with institutions of French Ministry of Culture or other Ministries. These training experiences are also organized abroad, within different frameworks.

Each year, the department welcomes about 60 students.

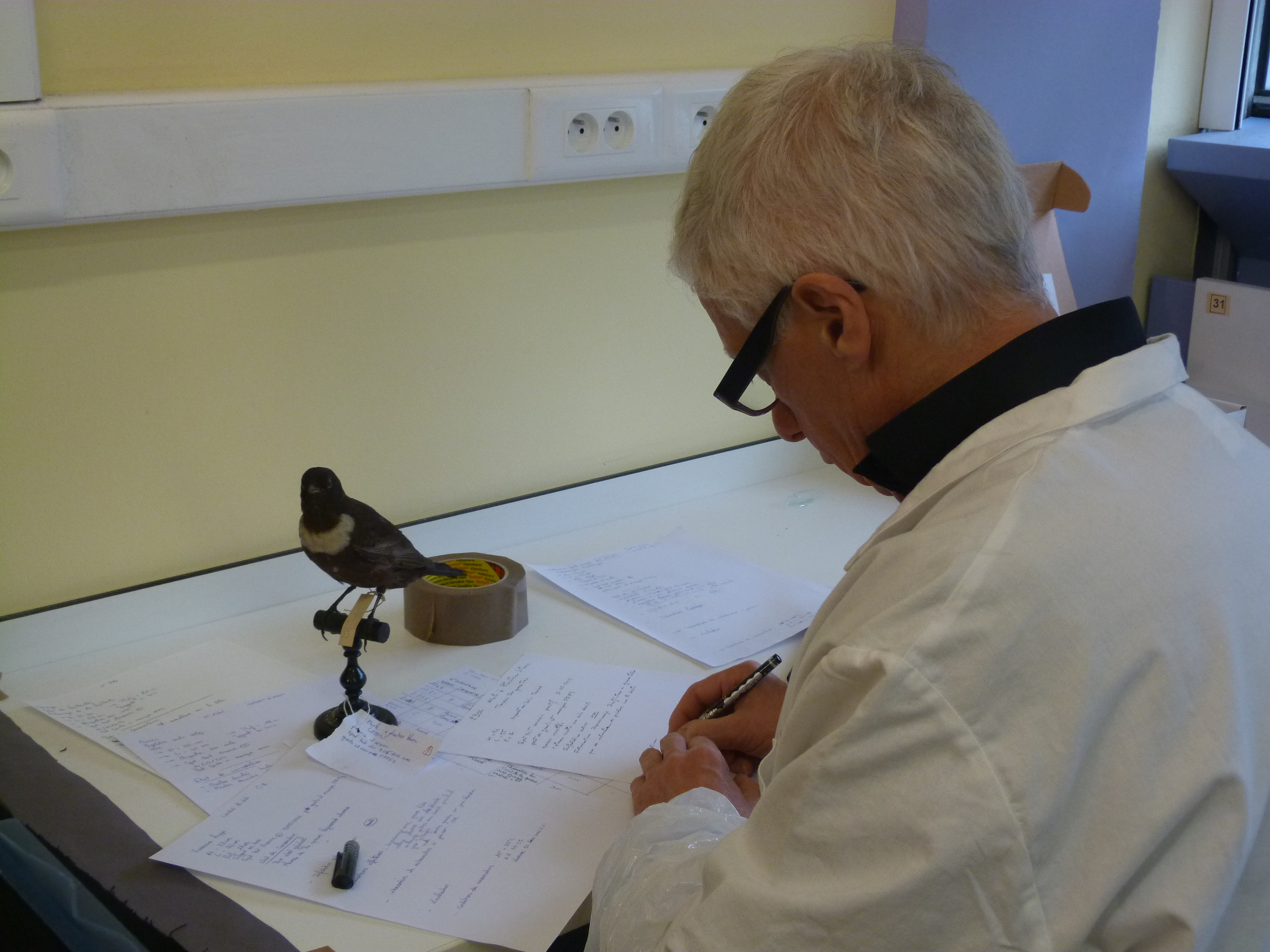

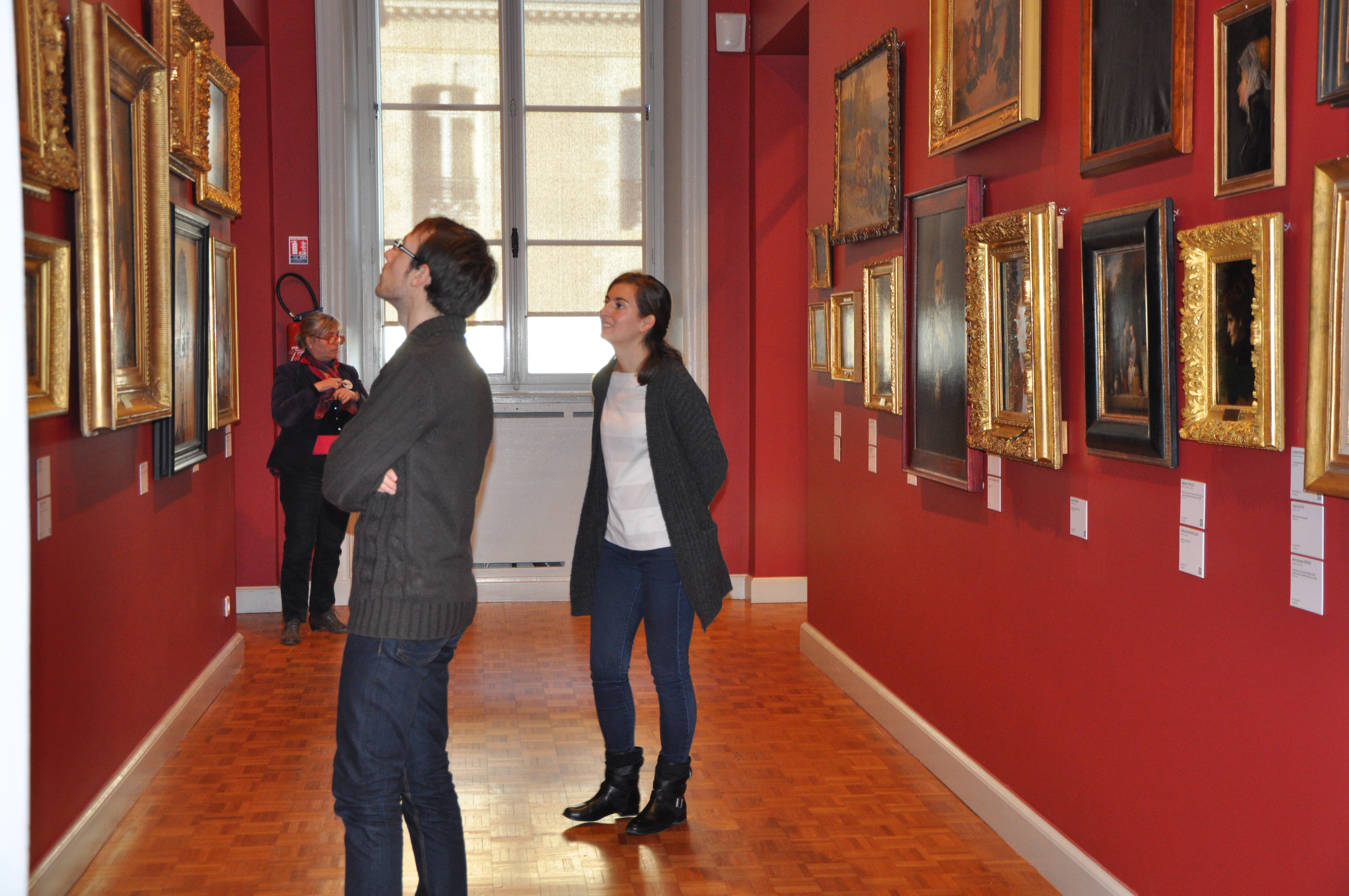

=== Department of conservators ===
The mission of the department is to select candidates through a competitive entrance examination and train conservators capable and authorized to work on public collections. The profile of the laureates varies : art historians, scientists, craftsmen, artistic careers...

The training lasts 5 years and conservators are rarely civil servants in the French context. It is divided into theoretical and practical courses and internships in France and abroad (9 months). During the 5 years, some internships concern individual students only and some others participate in field-schools or other team experiences on sites. These opportunities as well as conservation on real artworks from public collections are permitted thanks to agreements with institutions of French Ministry of Culture, such as museums, or other Ministries. Internships are also organized abroad (6 months), within different frameworks.

Each year the department welcomes about 100 students.

On June 22, 2018, the Institut national du patrimoine received the European Union's Cultural Heritage Award / Europa Nostra rewarding the teaching method of the field-schools organized by the department of the conservators.

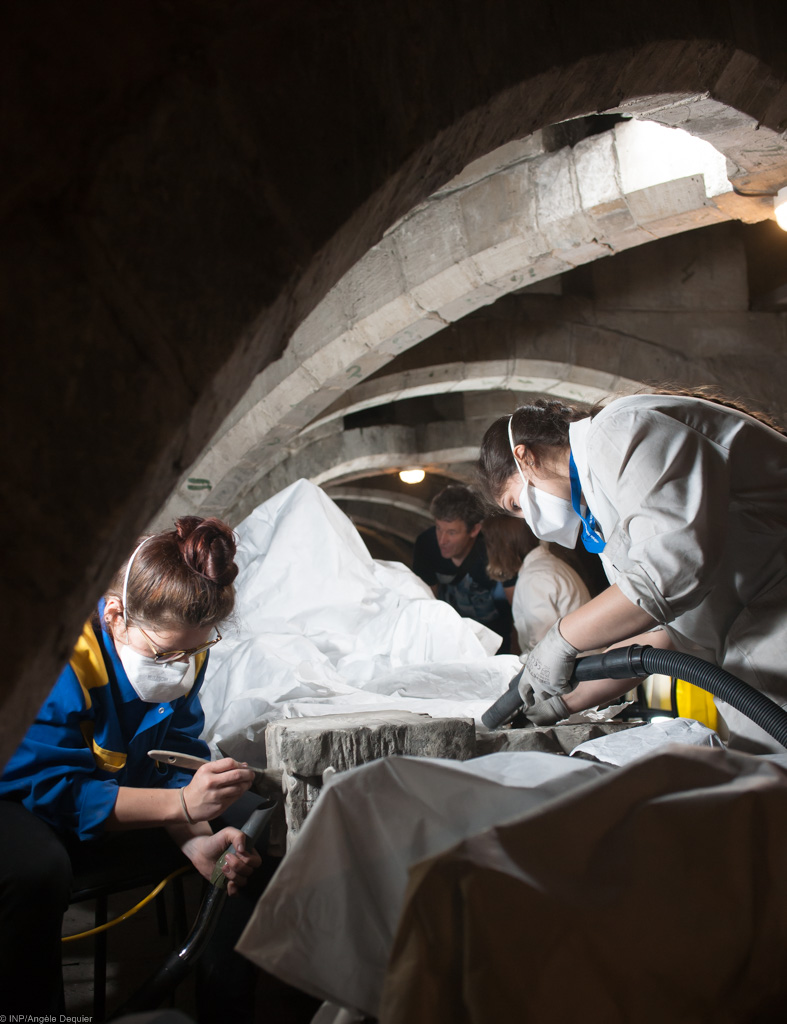

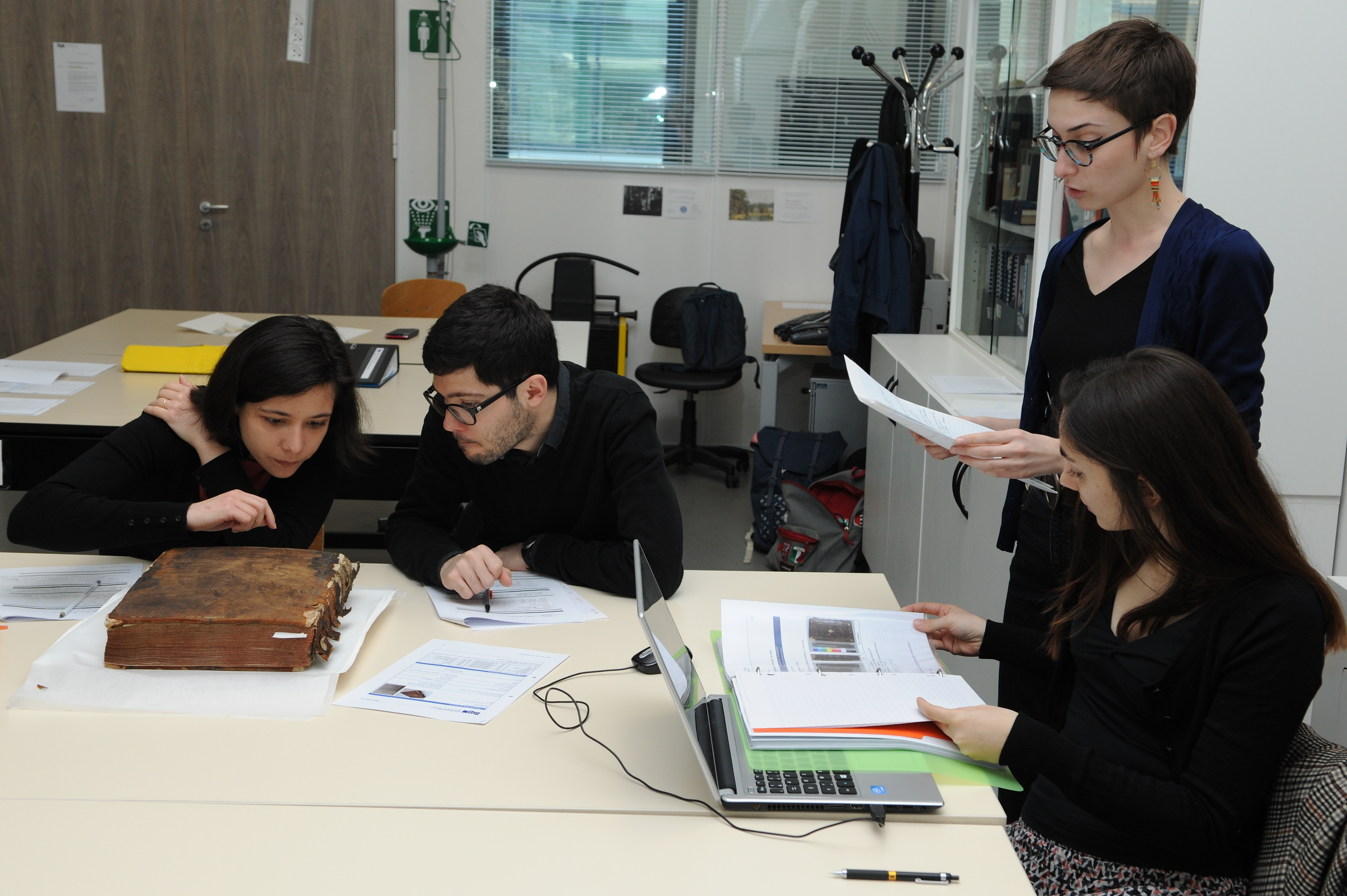

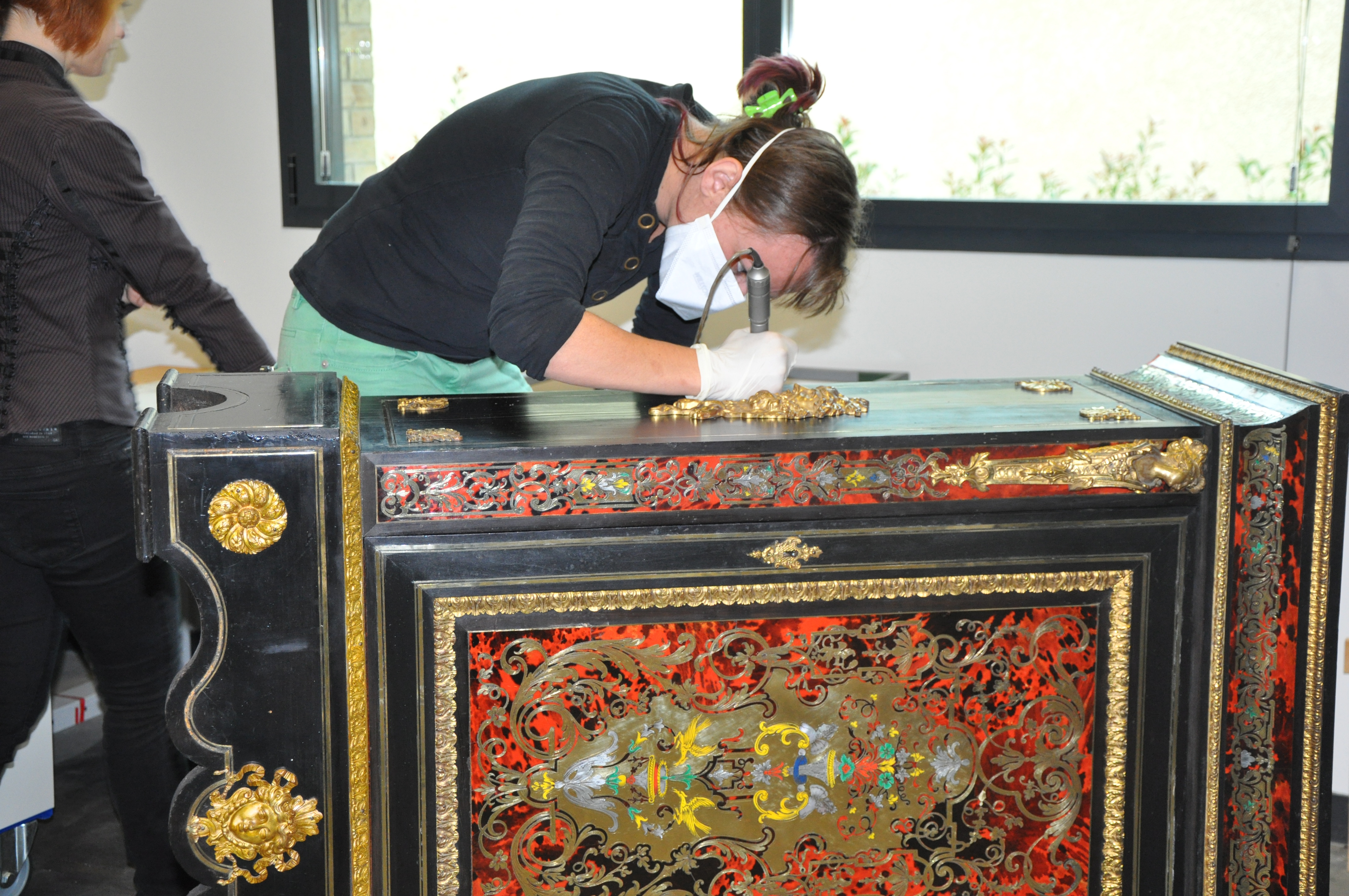

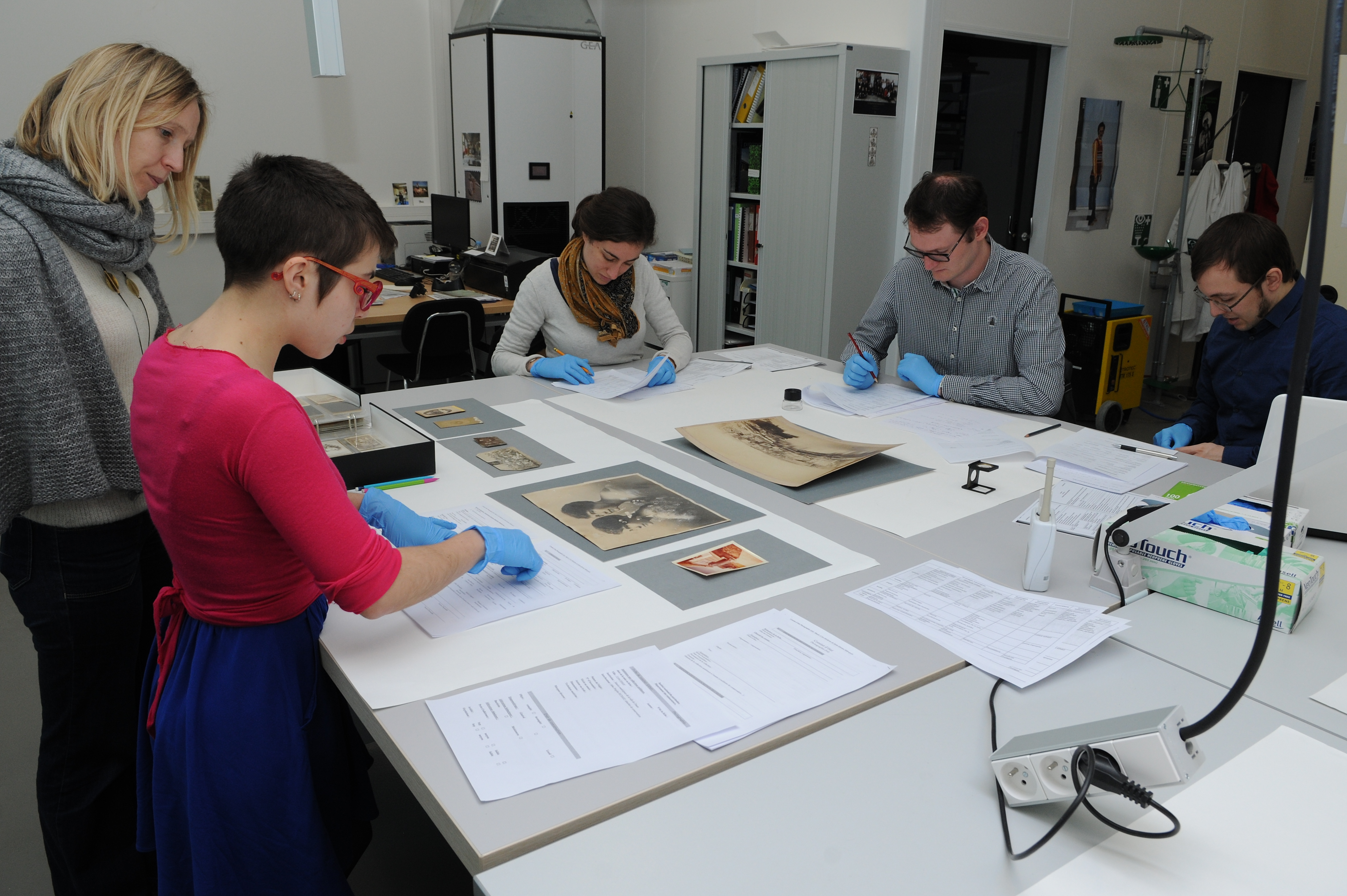

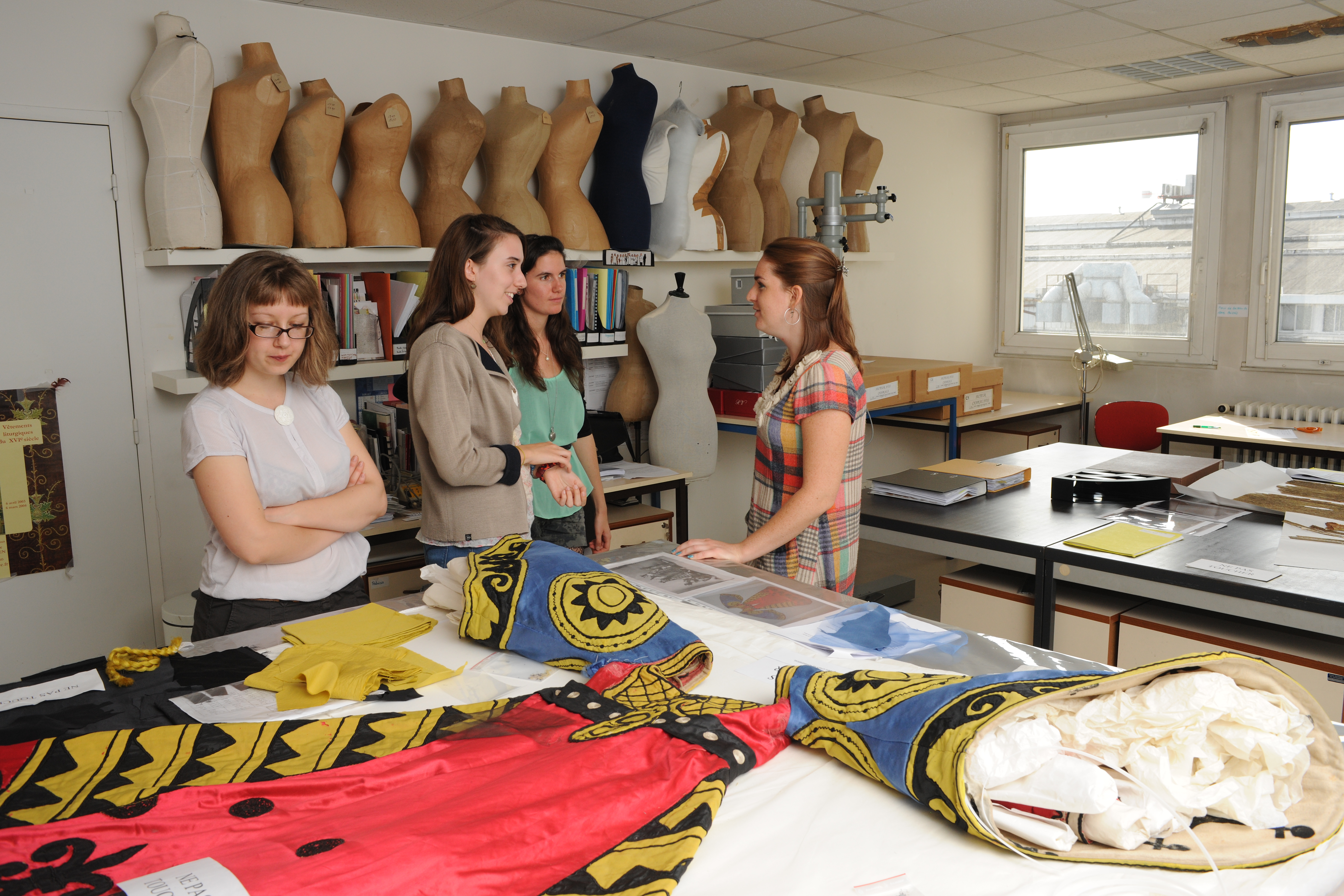

== Entrance examinations ==
=== Entrance examination to the department of curators ===
Competitive recruitment examinations for heritage curators are organised by the Inp acting for the State, the City of Paris and, on the basis of an agreement with the CNFPT (State civil service) and local government authorities. All candidates must be of French nationality or nationals of a Member State of the European Union or of a State party to the Agreement on the European Economic Area. External competitive examinations are open to candidates holding a bachelor's degree (or equivalent). Internal competitive examinations are open to State civil servants, military personnel and judges, civil servants in local government authorities and public institutions. They can be in active employment, on secondment, on parental leave or on military service or in office within an international intergovernmental organisation .

About 30 candidates are admitted each year.

=== Entrance examination to the department of conservators ===
The competitive examination is open to both French and Foreign candidates, holder of a Baccalaureate certificate or equivalent and under 30 years of age by 31 December of the year preceding admission year. Special exceptions may be granted, according to age and degree, based upon experience already acquired or other specific situations. Seven specialties are proposed for the admissions test: earthenware and glassware (metal, ceramic, glass, enamel), graphic arts and books, Textile arts, Furniture, Painting (easel, mural), photography, Sculpture.

About 20 candidates are admitted each year.

== Degrees ==
As the Institut national du patrimoine is placed under the authority of French Ministry of Culture rather than Ministry of Education, it delivers its own degrees which give the title of "heritage curator" ("conservateur du patrimoine") for the department of curators and "heritage conservator" ("restaurateur du patrimoine") for the department of conservators. The title is accompanied by the name of the specialty in which the person graduated.

The level of the 5-year training degree of conservators has been recognized officially as being equivalent to a Master II.

== Continuing education ==
The Inp also proposes a wide range of continuing education programmes for both French and foreign heritage professionals: in Paris (department of curators), in Aubervilliers (department of conservators-restorers), in Marseille (Institut Méditerranéen des Métiers du Patrimoine I2MP through a collaboration with the MuCEM), or elsewhere in accordance with local authorities. Distance learning courses are also proposed.

== Research ==
The curators have to produce a research project before their graduation in one of these specialties: museums, archaeology, archives, inventory and historical monuments, natural and scientific heritage.

The conservators have to produce a technical and scientific research project before graduating and their 5th year is devoted to a conservation work and study in the conservation field of their specialty: Earthenware and glassware (metal, ceramic, enamel, glass), Graphic arts and books, Textile arts, Furniture, Painting, Photography or Sculpture.

== Laboratory ==
The laboratory consists of a team including a research engineer, in charge of the laboratory, specialising in the analysis of organic matter through gas chromatography-mass spectrometry, a project engineer, assistant to the laboratory head, is in charge of analysing modern hybrid matter through infrared spectroscopy, an assistant engineer and assistant to the laboratory head, is in charge of micro x-ray fluorescence and the analysis of inorganic matter.

The activity and expertise of the laboratory enters within the framework of the initial training programme of conservators and is located in Aubervilliers. It is equipped with scientific imaging equipment within the establishment including several microanalytical techniques (stereo microscopy and optical microscopy, micro x-ray fluorescence, gas chromatography-mass spectrometry, internal reflection infrared spectroscopy : external reflection scanning electron microscopy)...

Partnerships exist between the laboratory and research laboratories in the Ministry of Culture (C2RMF, LRMH et CRCC), as well as with musée du Quai Branly, Bibliothèque nationale de France (National Library of France), Fondation des Sciences du Patrimoine (foundation for Cultural Heritage Sciences), ComUE heSam, Centre Pompidou, Le Corbusier Foundation, Centre national d'Art Plastique (CNAP), Carnot Foundation or the Museum of Modern Art (MoMA) in New York.

== Resources ==
The library, located in Aubervilliers, is a place of consultation and research that is, in Europe, the second reference library in the conservation of cultural heritage. The documentation and resource center, located in Paris, regroups the different documents related to the management, conservation and enhancement of cultural heritage.
